= History of local government in Wales =

The history of local government in Wales in a recognisably modern form emerged during the late 19th century. Administrative counties and county boroughs were first established in Wales in 1889. Urban and rural districts were formed in 1894. These were replaced in 1974 by a two-tier authority system across the country comprising eight counties and, within them, thirty-seven districts. This system was itself replaced by the introduction of 22 single-tier authorities in 1996.

== Local Government Act 1888 ==
From 1889 to 1974, counties made up of administrative counties and county boroughs were used for local government purposes. The counties were created by the Local Government Act 1888 (51 & 52 Vict. c. 41), which applied without distinction across Wales and England, and in Wales the administrative counties were based on the historic counties of Wales, but they were not entirely identical.

The 1888 act did not create elected district councils, but anticipated their later creation, which came with the Local Government Act 1894 (56 & 57 Vict. c. 73). The 1894 act created 'urban districts' and 'rural districts'.

=== Administrative counties ===
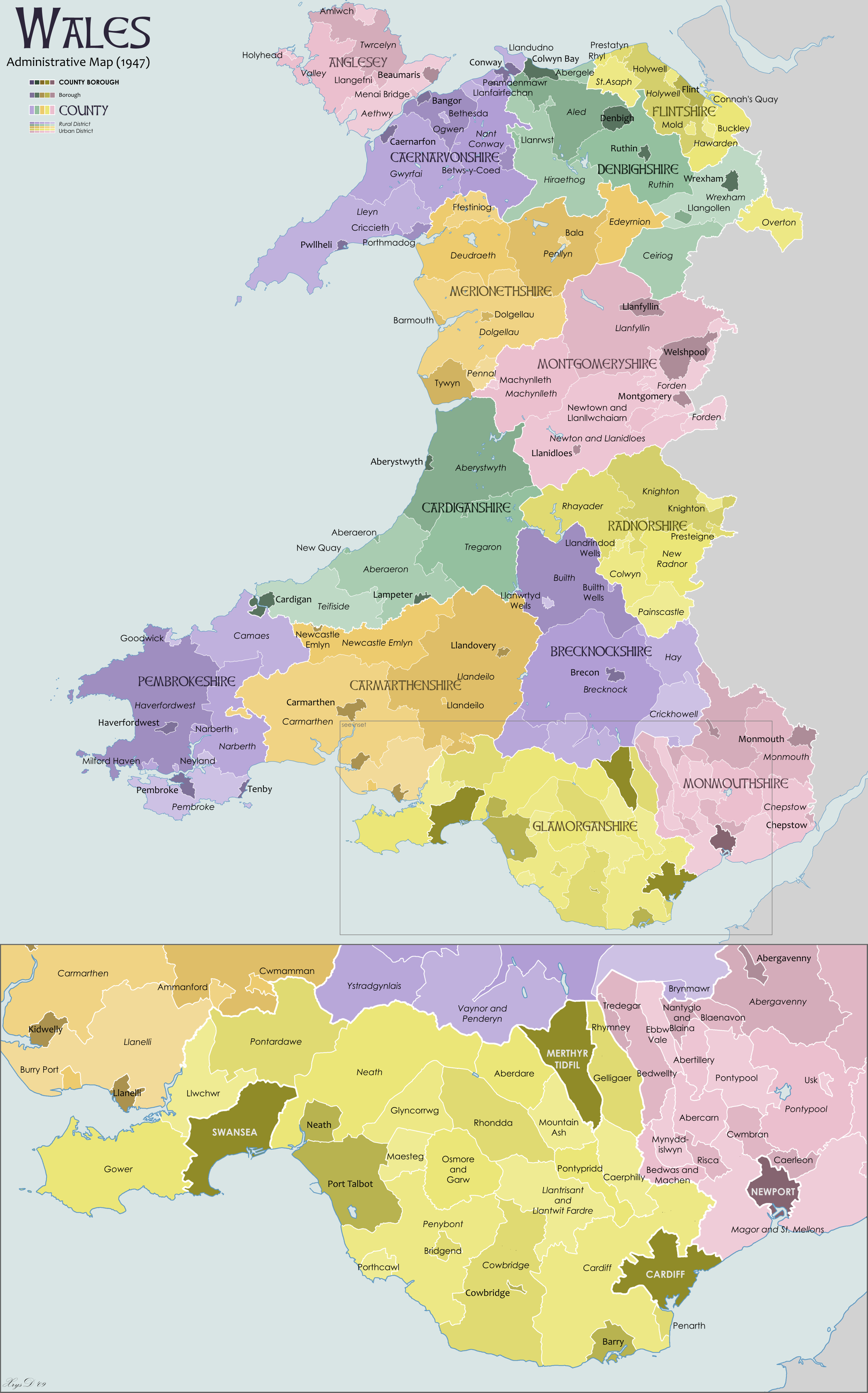

The table shows the area and population of administrative counties in Wales as recorded at the censuses of 1891 and 1961.

Administrative county	Area 1891 acres (km^{2})	Population 1891	Area 1961 acres (km^{2})	Population 1961
Anglesey	175,836 (712)	50,098	176,694 (715)	51,705
Brecknockshire	469,894 (1,902)	51,393	469,281 (1,899)	55,185
Cardiganshire	443,071 (1,793)	63,467	443,189 (1,794)	53,648
Carmarthenshire	587,816 (2,379)	130,566	588,271 (2,381)	168,008
Caernarfonshire^{(1)}	360,138 (1,457)	117,233	364,108 (1,473)	121,767
Denbighshire	424,235 (1,717)	118,843	427,978 (1,732)	174,151
Flintshire	164,051 (664)	77,277	163,707 (662)	150,082
Glamorgan	505,815 (2,047)	467,954	468,808 (1,897)	523,253
Merionethshire	427,810 (1,731)	49,212	422,372 (1,709)	38,310
Monmouthshire	342,548 (1,386)	203,347	346,779 (1,403)	336,556
Montgomeryshire	510,111 (2,064)	58,003	510,110 (2,064)	41,165
Pembrokeshire	392,710 (1,589)	88,296	393,008 (1,590)	94,124
Radnorshire	301,164 (1,219)	21,791	301,165 (1,219)	18,471

^{(1)}Renamed from Carnarvonshire, 1 July 1926

=== County boroughs ===
There were also a number of administratively independent county boroughs:

- Cardiff created in 1889 (associated with Glamorgan)
- Swansea, created in 1889 (associated with Glamorgan)
- Newport, separated from Monmouthshire in 1891
- Merthyr Tydfil, separated from Glamorgan in 1908

County borough	Area 1911 acres (km^{2})	Population 1911	Area 1961 acres (km^{2})	Population 1961
Cardiff	6,373 (26)	182,259	15,085 (61)	256,582
Merthyr Tydfil	17,761 (72)	80,990	17,760 (72)	59,039
Newport	4,504 (18)	83,691	7,691 (31)	112,298
Swansea	5,202 (21)	114,663	21,600 (87)	167,322

== Local Government Act 1972: Counties and districts ==
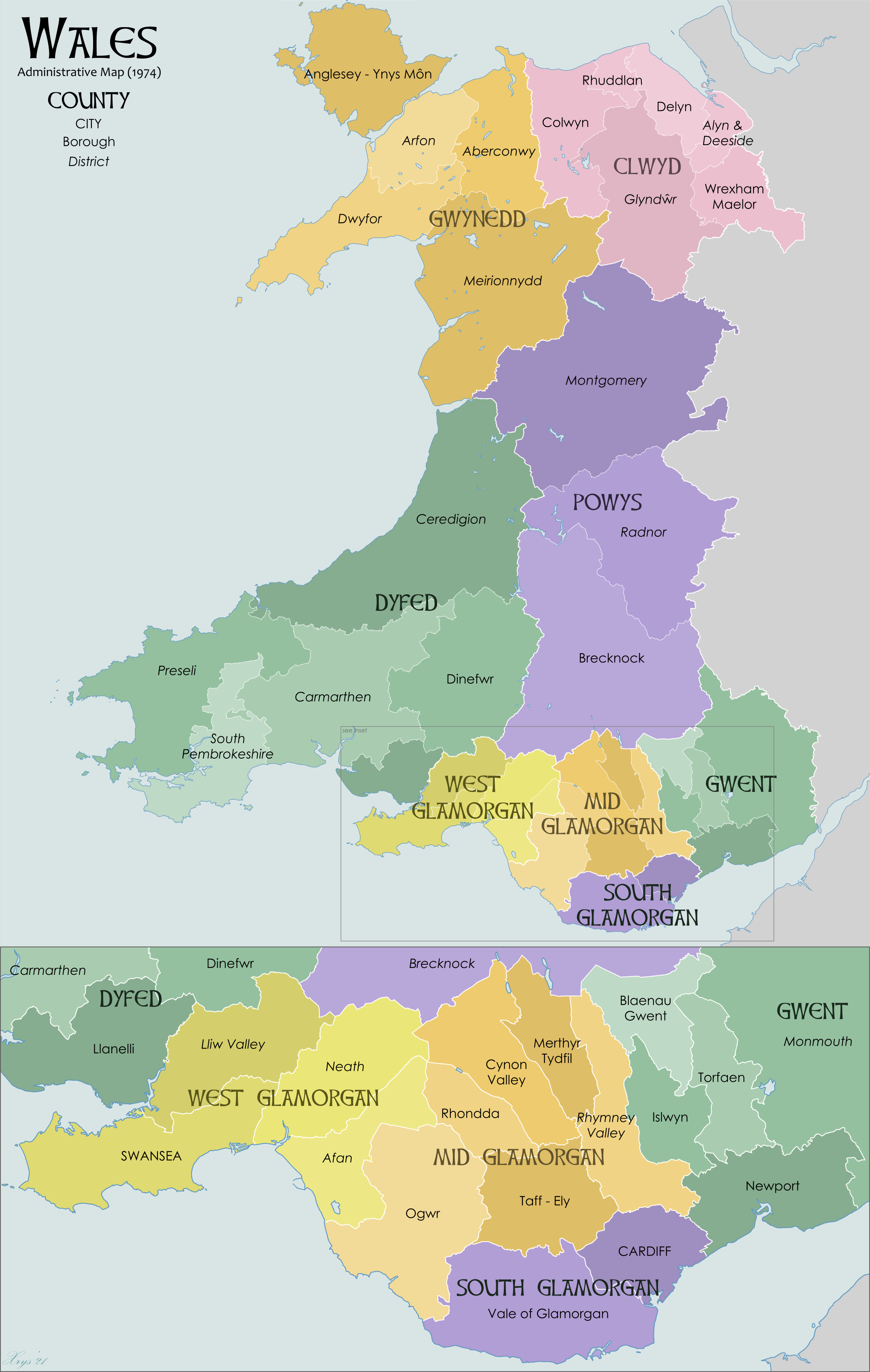

In 1974, the existing administrative counties and county boroughs were abolished and replaced by eight new two-tier authorities, instead called 'counties' by the Local Government Act 1972 (1972 c. 70). These counties were sub-divided into lower-tier districts.

The counties were all given names in Welsh only, apart from the three in Glamorgan, which had English names as well as Welsh. The creation of these new administrative areas effectively separated the administrative function from the traditional counties, although in reality this had occurred in 1889.

These two-tier counties were abolished in 1996 and replaced with principal areas, each of which is designated as either a county or county borough. The names and areas of the pre-1996 counties were retained with slight modifications for some ceremonial purposes such as Lieutenancy, and became known as the preserved counties of Wales, which were amended in 2003 by S.I. 2003/974 to ensure that each principal area is wholly within one preserved county.

=== Counties ===
1. Gwent
2. South Glamorgan
  (De Morgannwg)
3. Mid Glamorgan
  (Morgannwg Ganol)
4. West Glamorgan
  (Gorllewin Morgannwg)
5. Dyfed
6. Powys
7. Gwynedd
8. Clwyd

=== Districts ===
The counties were sub-divided into districts, these were:

- Clwyd — Alyn and Deeside, Colwyn, Delyn, Glyndwr, Rhuddlan, Wrexham Maelor
- Dyfed — Carmarthen, Ceredigion, Dinefwr, Llanelli, Preseli Pembrokeshire (named Preseli until 1987), South Pembrokeshire
- Gwent — Blaenau Gwent, Islwyn, Monmouth, Newport, Torfaen
- Gwynedd — Aberconwy, Arfon, Dwyfor, Meirionnydd, Anglesey
- Mid Glamorgan — Cynon Valley, Ogwr, Merthyr Tydfil, Rhondda, Rhymney Valley, Taff–Ely
- Powys — Brecknock, Montgomery, Radnor
- South Glamorgan — Cardiff, Vale of Glamorgan
- West Glamorgan — Lliw Valley, Neath, Port Talbot (named Afan until 1986), Swansea

== 1996 ==
The redistribution of these districts into the current principal areas is as follows:

Principal area	Previous districts
Blaenau Gwent	most of Blaenau Gwent
Bridgend	most of Ogwr
Caerphilly	Islwyn, Rhymney Valley
Carmarthenshire	Carmarthen, Llanelli, Dinefwr
Cardiff	Cardiff, part of Taff–Ely
Ceredigion	Ceredigion
Conwy	Aberconwy, most of Colwyn
Denbighshire	Rhuddlan, parts of Glyndwr and Colwyn
Flintshire	Alyn and Deeside, Delyn
Gwynedd	Arfon, Dwyfor, Meirionnydd
Isle of Anglesey	Anglesey
Merthyr Tydfil	Merthyr Tydfil
Monmouthshire	Monmouth, part of Blaenau Gwent
Neath Port Talbot	Neath, Port Talbot, parts of Lliw Valley
Newport	Newport
Pembrokeshire	Preseli Pembrokeshire, South Pembrokeshire
Powys	Montgomeryshire, Radnorshire, Brecknock, part of Glyndwr
Rhondda Cynon Taf	Rhondda, Cynon Valley, most of Taff-Ely
Swansea	Swansea, parts of Lliw Valley
Torfaen	Torfaen
Vale of Glamorgan	most of Vale of Glamorgan
Wrexham	most of Wrexham, parts of Glyndwr

== See also ==
- Local government in Wales
- History of local government in the United Kingdom
