= List of rural and urban districts in Wales in 1973 =

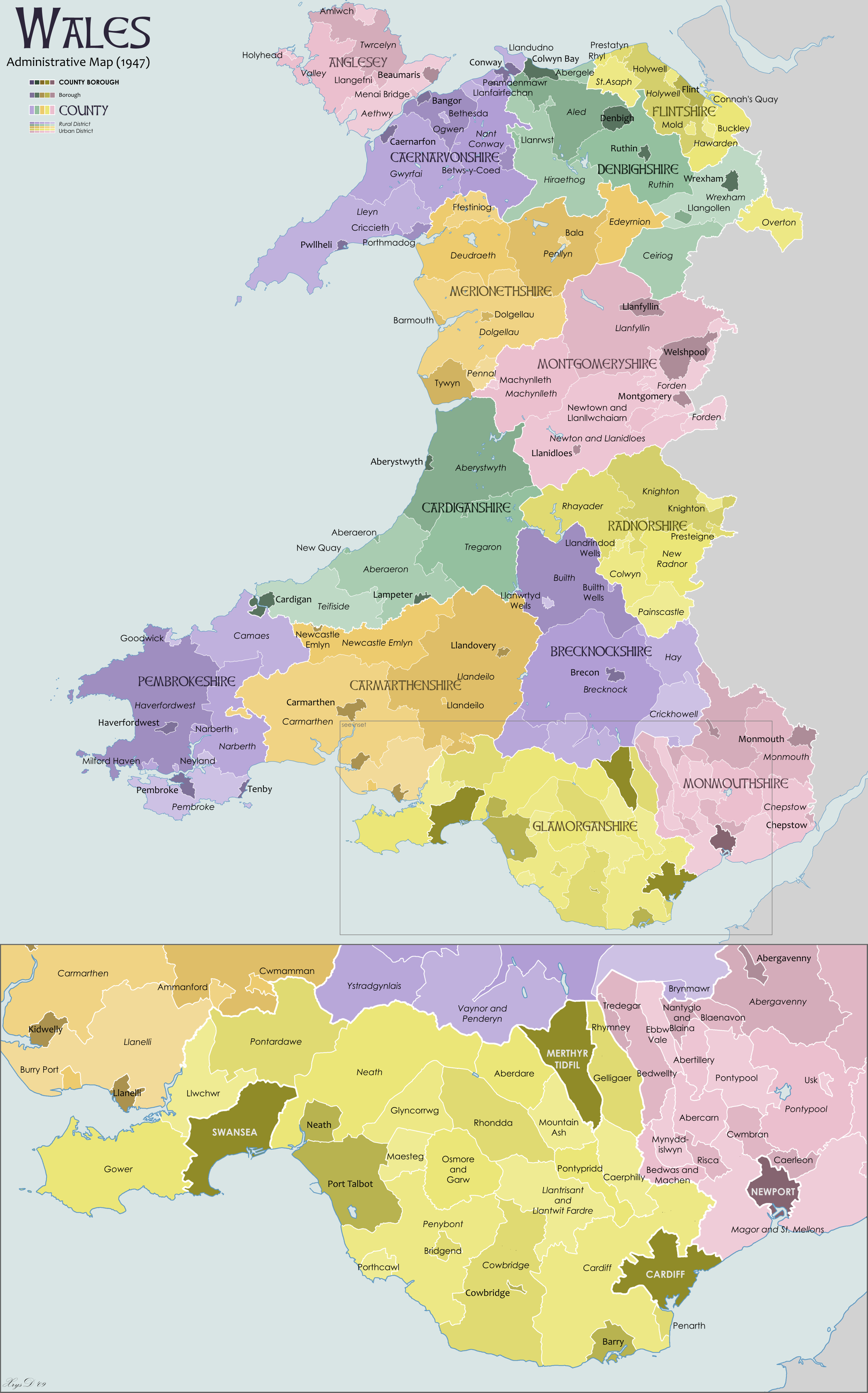
Subdivisions of Wales in 1947; few changes were made by 1973

This is a list of the municipal boroughs, urban districts, and rural districts in Wales immediately prior to the coming into force of the Local Government Act 1972 in 1974. The number of districts gradually reduced from their creation in 1894 through consolidation.

In addition to these 165 local government sub divisions of the 13 County Councils, Wales also had 4 county boroughs, Cardiff, Swansea, Newport and Merthyr Tydfil. Following the establishment of the Welsh Office in 1966, and subsequent legislative processes, the question of whether Monmouthshire (including Newport) should be considered as being within Wales was no longer in serious dispute, and it was finally conclusively resolved by the Local Government Act 1972.

== Anglesey ==
District	Successor
Aethwy Rural District	Anglesey
Amlwch Urban District	Anglesey
Beaumaris Borough	Anglesey
Holyhead Urban District	Anglesey
Llangefni Urban District	Anglesey
Menai Bridge Urban District	Anglesey
Twrcelyn Rural District	Anglesey
Valley Rural District	Anglesey

== Brecon (Brecknockshire) ==
District	Successor
Brecknock Rural District	Brecknock
Brecon Borough	Brecknock
Brynmawr Urban District	Blaenau Gwent
Builth Wells Rural District	Brecknock
Builth Wells Urban District	Brecknock
Crickhowell Rural District	Blaenau Gwent, Brecknock
Hay Rural District	Brecknock
Hay Urban District	Brecknock
Llanwrtyd Wells Urban District	Brecknock
Vaynor and Penderyn Rural District	Merthyr Tydfil, Brecknock, Cynon Valley
Ystradgynlais Rural District	Brecknock

== Caernarvonshire ==
District	Successor
Bangor Borough	Arfon
Bethesda Urban District	Arfon
Betws-y-Coed Urban District	Aberconwy
Caernarfon Royal Borough	Arfon
Conwy Borough	Aberconwy
Criccieth Urban District	Dwyfor
Gwyrfai Rural District	Arfon, Dwyfor
Llandudno Urban District	Aberconwy
Llanfairfechan Urban District	Aberconwy
Lleyn Rural District	Dwyfor
Nant Conway Rural District	Aberconwy
Ogwen Rural District	Arfon
Penmaenmawr Urban District	Aberconwy
Porthmadog Urban District	Dwyfor
Pwllheli Borough	Dwyfor

== Cardiganshire ==
District	Successor
Aberaeron Rural District	Ceredigion
Aberaeron Urban District	Ceredigion
Aberystwyth Borough	Ceredigion
Aberystwyth Rural District	Ceredigion
Cardigan Borough	Ceredigion
Lampeter Borough	Ceredigion
New Quay Urban District	Ceredigion
Teifiside Rural District	Ceredigion
Tregaron Rural District	Ceredigion

== Carmarthenshire ==
District	Successor
Ammanford Urban District	Dinefwr
Burry Port Urban District	Llanelli
Carmarthen Borough	Carmarthen
Carmarthen Rural District	Carmarthen
Cwmamman Urban District	Dinefwr
Kidwelly Borough	Llanelli
Llandeilo Rural District	Dinefwr
Llandeilo Urban District	Dinefwr
Llandovery Borough	Dinefwr
Llanelli Borough	Llanelli
Llanelli Rural District	Llanelli
Newcastle Emlyn Rural District	Carmarthen
Newcastle Emlyn Urban District	Carmarthen
Whitland Rural District	Carmarthen

== Denbighshire ==
District	Successor
Abergele Urban District	Colwyn
Aled Rural District	Colwyn, Aberconwy
Ceiriog Rural District	Glyndwr
Colwyn Bay Borough	Colwyn
Denbigh Borough	Glyndwr
Hiraethog Rural District	Aberconwy, Colwyn
Llangollen Urban District	Glyndwr
Llanrwst Urban District	Aberconwy
Ruthin Borough	Glyndwr
Ruthin Rural District	Glyndwr
Wrexham Borough	Wrexham Maelor
Wrexham Rural District	Wrexham Maelor, Glyndwr

== Flintshire ==
District	Successor
Buckley Urban District	Alyn and Deeside
Connah's Quay Urban District	Alyn and Deeside
Flint Borough	Delyn
Hawarden Rural District	Wrexham Maelor, Alyn and Deeside
Holywell Rural District	Delyn
Holywell Urban District	Delyn
Maelor Rural District	Wrexham Maelor
Mold Urban District	Delyn
Prestatyn Urban District	Rhuddlan
Rhyl Urban District	Rhuddlan
St Asaph (Flint) Rural District	Rhuddlan

== Glamorgan (Glamorganshire) ==
District	Successor
Aberdare Urban District	Cynon Valley
Barry Borough	Vale of Glamorgan
Bridgend Urban District	Ogwr
Caerphilly Urban District	Rhymney Valley, Taff-Ely
Cardiff Rural District	Vale of Glamorgan, Cardiff, Rhymney Valley, Taff-Ely
Cowbridge Borough	Vale of Glamorgan
Cowbridge Rural District	Taff-Ely, Vale of Glamorgan
Gelligaer Urban District	Rhymney Valley, Merthyr Tydfil
Glyncorrwg Urban District	Port Talbot
Gower Rural District	Swansea
Llantrisant and Llantwit Fardre Rural District	Taff-Ely
Llwchwr Urban District	Lliw Valley
Maesteg Urban District	Ogwr
Mountain Ash Urban District	Cynon Valley
Neath Borough	Neath
Neath Rural District	Neath, Cynon Valley
Ogmore and Garw Urban District	Ogwr
Penarth Urban District	Vale of Glamorgan
Penybont Rural District	Ogwr
Pontardawe Rural District	Lliw Valley
Pontypridd Urban District	Taff-Ely
Port Talbot Borough	Port Talbot
Porthcawl Urban District	Ogwr
Rhondda Borough	Rhondda

Cardiff, Merthyr Tidfil and Swansea were county boroughs.

== Merioneth (Merionethshire) ==
District	Successor
Bala Urban District	Meirionnydd
Barmouth Urban District	Meirionnydd
Deudraeth Rural District	Meirionnydd
Dolgellau Rural District	Meirionnydd
Dolgellau Urban District	Meirionnydd
Edeyrnion Rural District	Glyndwr
Ffestiniog Urban District	Meirionnydd
Penllyn Rural District	Meirionnydd
Tywyn Urban District	Meirionnydd

== Monmouthshire ==
District	Successor
Abercarn Urban District	Islwyn
Abergavenny Borough	Monmouth
Abergavenny Rural District	Monmouth
Abertillery Urban District	Blaenau Gwent
Bedwas and Machen Urban District	Rhymney Valley
Bedwellty Urban District	Islwyn, Rhymney Valley
Blaenavon Urban District	Torfaen
Caerleon Urban District	Newport
Chepstow Rural District	Monmouth
Chepstow Urban District	Monmouth
Cwmbran Urban District	Torfaen
Ebbw Vale Urban District	Blaenau Gwent
Magor and St Mellons Rural District	Cardiff, Newport, Torfaen
Monmouth Borough	Monmouth
Monmouth Rural District	Monmouth
Mynyddislwyn Urban District	Islwyn
Nantyglo and Blaina Urban District	Blaenau Gwent
Pontypool Rural District	Torfaen, Monmouth
Pontypool Urban District	Torfaen
Rhymney Urban District	Rhymney Valley
Risca Urban District	Islwyn
Tredegar Urban District	Blaenau Gwent
Usk Urban District	Monmouth

Newport was a county borough.

== Montgomeryshire ==
District	Successor
Forden Rural District	Montgomery
Llanfyllin Borough	Montgomery
Llanfyllin Rural District	Montgomery
Llanidloes Borough	Montgomery
Machynlleth Rural District	Montgomery
Machynlleth Urban District	Montgomery
Montgomery Borough	Montgomery
Newtown and Llanidloes Rural District	Montgomery
Newtown and Llanllwchaiarn Urban District	Montgomery
Welshpool Borough	Montgomery

== Pembrokeshire ==
District	Successor
Cemaes Rural District	Preseli
Fishguard and Goodwick Urban District	Preseli
Haverfordwest Borough	Preseli
Haverfordwest Rural District	Preseli
Milford Haven Urban District	Preseli
Narberth Rural District	South Pembrokeshire
Narberth Urban District	South Pembrokeshire
Neyland Urban District	Preseli
Pembroke Borough	South Pembrokeshire
Pembroke Rural District	South Pembrokeshire
Tenby Borough	South Pembrokeshire

== Radnorshire ==
District	Successor
Colwyn Rural District	Radnor
Knighton Rural District	Radnor
Knighton Urban District	Radnor
Llandrindod Wells Urban District	Radnor
New Radnor Rural District	Radnor
Painscastle Rural District	Radnor
Presteigne Urban District	Radnor
Rhayader Rural District	Radnor

== See also ==
- List of rural and urban districts in England in 1973
- List of rural and urban districts in Northern Ireland
- List of local government areas in Scotland 1930–75
