= List of electoral wards in Mid Glamorgan =

Mid Glamorgan location within Wales

This list of electoral wards in Mid Glamorgan includes council wards which elected councillors to Mid Glamorgan County Council during its existence from 1 April 1974 to 1 April 1996.

== Wards ==
=== 1973–1989 ===
The first Mid Glamorgan Council elections took place in April 1973. Eighty five county councillors were elected from sixty eight electoral wards. as follows (numbers of councillors in brackets):

- Aberdare No.1 Llwydcoed (2)
- Aberdare No.2 Blaengwawr (1)
- Aberdare No.3 Gadlys (1)
- Aberdare No.4 Town (1)
- Aberdare No.5 Aberaman (1)
- Abertidwr & Senghenydd (1)
- Bedwas & Machen (2)
- Bedwellty No.1 (Aberbargoed) (1)
- Bedwellty No.2 (1)
- Bridgend (2)
- Caerphilly No.1 (1)
- Caerphilly No.2 Llanbradach (1)
- Caerphilly No.4 (1)
- Caerphilly No.5 North (1)
- Caerphilly No.6 South (1)
- Caerphilly No.7 (1)
- Cardiff Rural (1)
- Cowbridge Rural (1)
- Dowlais (1)
- Gelligaer No.1 (1)
- Gelligaer No.2 (1)
- Gelligaer No.3 (1)
- Gelligaer No.4 (2)
- Llantrisant & Llantwit Fardre No.1 (4)
- Llantrisant & Llantwit Fardre No.2 (2)
- Maesteg No.1 (1)
- Maesteg No.2 (1)
- Maesteg No.3 (1)
- Merthyr Cyfarthfa (1)
- Merthyr No.6 (1)
- Merthyr No.7 (1)
- Merthyr Park (2)
- Merthyr Town (1)
- Mountain Ash No.1 (1)
- Mountain Ash No.2 (1)
- Mountain Ash No.3 (2)
- Ogmore & Garw No.1 (1)
- Ogmore & Garw No.2 (2)
- Penybont No.1 (1)
- Penybont No.2 (1)
- Penybont No.3 (1)
- Penybont No.4 (1)
- Penybont No.5 (2)
- Penybont No.6 (2)
- Penydarren (1)
- Pontypridd No.1 (1)
- Pontypridd No.2 Town (1)
- Pontypridd No.3 (1)
- Pontypridd No.4 Trallwn (1)
- Pontypridd No.5 Rhydyfelin (1)
- Pontypridd No.6 Treforest & Graig (1)
- Porthcawl No.1 (1)
- Porthcawl No.2 (1)
- Rhondda No.1 Treherbert (2)
- Rhondda No.2 Treorchy (2)
- Rhondda No.3 Pentre (1)
- Rhondda No.4 Ystrad (1)
- Rhondda No.5 (1)
- Rhondda No.6 (1)
- Rhondda No.7 Penygraig (1)
- Rhondda No.8 Porth (2)
- Rhondda No.9 (1)
- Rhondda No.10 Tylerstown (1)
- Rhondda No.11 Ferndale (2)
- Rhymney Lower Middle & Upper (1)
- Treharris (1)
- Vaynor & Penderyn (1)
- Vaynor & Penderyn No.2 (1)

=== 1989–1996 ===
Following The County of Mid Glamorgan (Electoral Arrangements) Order 1988 the number of wards were increased to 74, taking effect from the 1989 elections (and preparatory activity beforehand). Each ward elected one county councillor to Mid Glamorgan Council, totalling 74.

Mid Glamorgan was divided into local government districts (often with borough status), namely Borough of Cynon Valley, Borough of Merthyr Tydfil, Borough of Ogwr, Borough of Rhondda, District of Rhymney Valley and Borough of Taff-Ely. These also had their own elected borough or district council.

| Mid Glamorgan Ward | District | District ward included |
|---|---|---|
| Aberaman North | Cynon Valley (borough) | Aberaman North |
| Aberaman South | Cynon Valley (borough) | Aberaman South |
| Abercynon | Cynon Valley (borough) | Abercynon |
| Aberdare East | Cynon Valley (borough) | Aberdare East |
| Aberdare West | Cynon Valley (borough) | Aberdare West / Llwydcoed |
| Aber Valley | Rhymney Valley | Aber Valley |
| Bargoed | Rhymney Valley | Bargoed / Gilfach |
| Bedwas | Rhymney Valley | Maesycwmmer / Bedwas (Bedwas and Machen*) / Parcyfelin (Caerphilly*) |
| Bedwelty | Rhymney Valley | Aberbargoed / New Tredegar |
| Bettws | Ogwr (borough) | Bettws / Ynysawdre |
| Brackla | Ogwr (borough) | Brackla |
| Caerau | Ogwr (borough) | Caerau / Nantyffyllon |
| Cascade | Rhymney Valley | Cascade (Gelligaer*) / Cefn Hengoed (Gelligaer*) / Tir-y-berth (Gelligaer*) |
| Cornelly | Ogwr (borough) | Cornelly |
| Cwmbach | Cynon Valley (borough) | Cwmbach |
| Cwm Garw | Ogwr (borough) | Blaengarw / Llangeinor / Pontycymmer |
| Cwm Ogwr | Ogwr (borough) | Blackmill / Nant-y-moel / Ogmore Vale |
| Cyfarthfa | Merthyr Tydfil (borough) | Cyfarthfa |
| Cymmer | Rhondda (borough) | Cymmer |
| Darren Valley | Rhymney Valley | Abertysswg / Darren Valley / Pontlottyn / Tir-Phil |
| Dowlais | Merthyr Tydfil (borough) | Dowlais |
| Ferndale | Rhondda (borough) | Ferndale / Maerdy |
| Gurnos | Merthyr Tydfil (borough) | Gurnos |
| Hirwaun | Cynon Valley (borough) | Hirwaun / Pen-y-waun / Rhigos |
| Laleston | Ogwr (borough) | Laleston |
| Litchard | Ogwr (borough) | Coity Higher / Morfa |
| Llanbradach | Rhymney Valley | Llanbradach / Energlyn (Penyrheol*) |
| Llanharan | Taff-Ely (borough) | Brynna / Llanharan / Llanharry |
| Llantrisant Town | Taff-Ely (borough) | Llantrisant Town / Talbot Green |
| Llantwit Fardre | Taff-Ely (borough) | Church Village / Llantwit Fardre |
| Machen | Rhymney Valley | Machen / Trethomas (Bedwas and Machen*) |
| Maesteg East | Ogwr (borough) | Maesteg East |
| Maesteg West | Ogwr (borough) | Maesteg West |
| Merthyr Vale | Merthyr Tydfil (borough) | Merthyr Vale |
| Mountain Ash | Cynon Valley (borough) | Mountain Ash East / Mountain Ash West |
| Nelson | Rhymney Valley | Nelson / Greenhill (Gelligaer*) |
| Newcastle | Ogwr (borough) | Newcastle / Oldcastle |
| Newcastle Higher | Ogwr (borough) | Llangynwyd / Newcastle Higher |
| Park | Merthyr Tydfil (borough) | Park / Vaynor |
| Pencoed | Ogwr (borough) | Pencoed |
| Penrhiwceiber | Cynon Valley (borough) | Penrhiwceiber |
| Pentre | Rhondda (borough) | Pentre |
| Penydarren | Merthyr Tydfil (borough) | Penydarren |
| Pen-y-graig | Rhondda (borough) | Pen-y-graig |
| Penyrheol | Rhymney Valley | Penyrheol (Penyrheol*) / Trecenydd (Penyrheol*) |
| Plymouth | Merthyr Tydfil (borough) | Plymouth |
| Pont-y-clun | Taff-Ely (borough) | Creigiau / Pont-y-clun |
| Porth | Rhondda (borough) | Porth / Ynyshir |
| Porthcawl East | Ogwr (borough) | Porthcawl East |
| Porthcawl West | Ogwr (borough) | Porthcawl West |
| Pyle | Ogwr (borough) | Cefn Cribwr / Pyle |
| Rhondda | Taff-Ely (borough) | Graig / Pontypridd Town / Rhondda |
| Rhydfelen | Taff-Ely (borough) | Hawthorn, Ilan, Rhydfelen Central and Rhydfelen Lower |
| Rhymney | Rhymney Valley | Moriah / Twyn Carno |
| St Bride's Major | Ogwr (borough) | Coychurch Lower / St Brides Major |
| St Bride's Minor | Ogwr (borough) | St Brides Minor |
| St James | Rhymney Valley | St James / Tonyfelin (Caerphilly*) |
| St Martins | Rhymney Valley | Bryncenydd (Caerphilly*) / St Martins |
| Taffs Well | Taff-Ely (borough) | Pentyrch / Taffs Well |
| Ton-teg | Taff-Ely (borough) | Ton-teg / Treforest |
| Tonypandy | Rhondda (borough) | Cwm Clydach / Tonypandy |
| Tonyrefail East | Taff-Ely (borough) | Tonyrefail East |
| Tonyrefail West | Taff-Ely (borough) | Gilfach Goch / Tonyrefail West |
| Trallwng | Taff-Ely (borough) | Cilfynydd / Glyncoch / Trallwng |
| Town | Merthyr Tydfil (borough) | Town |
| Trealaw | Rhondda (borough) | Llwyn-y-pia / Trealaw |
| Treharris | Merthyr Tydfil (borough) | Bedlinog / Treharris |
| Treherbert | Rhondda (borough) | Treherbert |
| Treorchy | Rhondda (borough) | Treorchy |
| Tylorstown | Rhondda (borough) | Tylorstown |
| Tyn-y-nant | Taff-Ely (borough) | Beddau / Tyn-y-nant |
| Ynysybwl | Cynon Valley (borough) | Ynysybwl |
| Ystrad | Rhondda (borough) | Ystrad |
| Ystrad Mynach | Rhymney Valley | Hengoed (Gelligaer*) / Ystrad Mynach |

* = Community (community ward of)

== See also ==
- List of electoral wards in Bridgend County Borough
- List of electoral wards in Merthyr Tydfil County Borough
- List of electoral wards in Rhondda Cynon Taf
- List of electoral wards in Wales
