= Local Government (Wales) Act 1994 =

Act of the Parliament of the United Kingdom

Local Government (Wales) Act 1994 (Note: Section 66(1).)
- Act of Parliament
- Parliament of the United Kingdom
- Long title: An Act to make provision with respect to local government in Wales.
- Citation: 1994 c.19
- Territorial extent: England and Wales (Note: Section 66(9).)

Dates
- Royal assent: 5 July 1994
- Commencement: various (Note: Section 66(2)–(4))
Other legislation
Amends	Defence Act 1842; Explosives Act 1875; Sheriffs Act 1887; Registration Service Act 1953; Nurses Agencies Act 1957; Weeds Act 1959; Land Compensation Act 1961; Scrap Metal Dealers Act 1964; Gas Act 1965; Local Government Act 1966; Plant Health Act 1967; Sea Fisheries (Shellfish) Act 1967; Employers' Liability (Compulsory Insurance) Act 1969; Late Night Refreshment Houses Act 1969; Local Government Act 1972; Slaughterhouses Act 1974; Lotteries and Amusements Act 1976; Rent Act 1977; Protection from Eviction Act 1977; Magistrates' Courts Act 1980; Zoo Licensing Act 1981; Public Health (Control of Disease) Act 1984; Road Traffic Regulation Act 1984; Cinemas Act 1985; Representation of the People Act 1985; Housing Associations Act 1985; Airports Act 1986; Fire Safety and Safety of Places of Sport Act 1987; Town and Country Planning Act 1990; Planning (Listed Buildings and Conservation Areas) Act 1990; Planning (Hazardous Substances) Act 1990; Planning (Consequential Provisions) Act 1990; Food Safety Act 1990; Deer Act 1991; Water Industry Act 1991; Water Resources Act 1991; Land Drainage Act 1991; Social Security Contributions and Benefits Act 1992; Social Security Administration Act 1992; Further and Higher Education Act 1992
Amended by	Police and Magistrates' Courts Act 1994; Environment Act 1995; Gas Act 1995; Education Act 1996; Employment Rights Act 1996; Housing Act 1996; Housing Grants, Construction and Regeneration Act 1996; Reserve Forces Act 1996; Justices of the Peace Act 1997; Lieutenancies Act 1997; Audit Commission Act 1998; Data Protection Act 1998; Government of Wales Act 1998; Statute Law (Repeals) Act 1998; Access to Justice Act 1999; European Parliamentary Elections Act 1999; Local Government Act 1999; Criminal Justice and Court Services Act 2000; Countryside and Rights of Way Act 2000; Race Relations (Amendment) Act 2000; Representation of the People Act 2000; Adoption and Children Act 2002; Communications Act 2003; Local Government Act 2003; Licensing Act 2003; Statute Law (Repeals) Act 2004; Traffic Management Act 2004; Constitutional Reform Act 2005; Gambling Act 2005; Public Services Ombudsman (Wales) Act 2005; Charities Act 2006; Commons Act 2006; Housing and Regeneration Act 2008; National Health Service (Consequential Provisions) Act 2006; Marine and Coastal Access Act 2009; Marine (Scotland) Act 2010; Charities Act 2011; Localism Act 2011; Parliamentary Voting System and Constituencies Act 2011; Mobile Homes (Wales) Act 2013; Scrap Metal Dealers Act 2013; Infrastructure Act 2015; Historic Environment (Wales) Act 2016; Local Government and Elections (Wales) Act 2021

Status: Amended

Text of statute as originally enacted

Revised text of statute as amended

Text of the Local Government (Wales) Act 1994 as in force today (including any amendments) within the United Kingdom, from legislation.gov.uk.

The Local Government (Wales) Act 1994 (c. 19) is an act of the Parliament of the United Kingdom which amended the Local Government Act 1972 to create the current local government structure in Wales of 22 unitary authority areas, referred to as principal areas in the Act, and abolished the previous two-tier structure of counties and districts. It came into effect on 1 April 1996.

== Background ==
In June 1991, the Secretary of State for Wales, David Hunt, published a consultation paper on reform of local government in Wales. The paper proposed the replacing of the existing two-tier system of administrative counties and districts, established by the Local Government Act 1972 in 1974, with unitary authorities. The number and size of the unitary areas was not set down, instead three options were given for ten, twenty or twenty-four new councils. On 3 March 1992, the Secretary of State made a statement in the House of Commons, in which he stated that the number of proposed unitary authorities was to be twenty-three. He further stated:

My approach in identifying these 23 authorities has been as follows. First, I want to restore to the largest centres of population - Cardiff, Swansea, Newport and also to Wrexham - full control over their own affairs.

Secondly, in the rural areas I want to see local government based on the traditional counties, such as Pembrokeshire, Montgomeryshire, Cardiganshire and Anglesey and, of course, we recognise the position of Meirionnyddshire and Carmarthenshire. I shall consult further on whether to extend that approach to separate authorities for Radnorshire and Brecknock.

Thirdly in the south Wales valleys I want as far as possible to take account of the intense local loyalties that are such a feature of the area. Taking account of demographic and other factors, however, I also consider it necessary for some of the present district councils in the valleys to come together to form new unitary authorities.

The areas of the new councils were not precisely defined, although a map was issued at the time of the statement.

The Conservatives held power at the general election held on 9 April 1992, and a white paper Local government in Wales: A Charter for the Future was published on St David's Day, 1 March 1993. The number of unitary authorities had been reduced to twenty-one, with the deletion of separate authorities for Merionethshire and Montgomeryshire, and their areas and proposed names were given. speaking in the commons, David Hunt said:

In making these proposals I have sought to balance the demands of local community loyalty with the requirements of effective and efficient service delivery, taking account of demographic factors, population distribution, geography and other relevant considerations.

The fire service, previously administered by county councils, was to be organised as three combined authorities. Elections for the new councils was to be in 1994, initially acting as "shadow authorities" until 1 April 1995, when they would assume their responsibilities.

Unitary authorities proposed by the 1993 white paper
Proposed authority	Existing council areas
Aberconwy and Colwyn	Aberconwy, Colwyn districts
Anglesey	Ynys Mon - Isle of Anglesey district
Bridgend	Ogwr district less the communities of Coychurch, Ewenny, St Bride's Major, Wick
Caernarfon and Meirionnydd	Arfon, Dwyfor and Meirionnydd districts, the communities of Cynwyd and Llandrillo from Glyndwr district
Caerphilly	Islwyn district, Rhymney Valley district less Daren Valley, New Tredegar and Rhymney communities
Cardiff	Cardiff district and the community of Pentyrch from Taff-Ely district
Cardiganshire	Ceredigion district
Carmarthenshire	Carmarthen, Dinefwr, Llanelli districts
Denbighshire	Rhuddlan district, most of Glyndwr district, part of Delyn district
Flintshire	Alyn and Deeside district, most of Delyn district
Glamorgan Valleys	Cynon Valley and Rhondda districts and the district of Taff-Ely less Pentyrch community
Heads of the Valleys	Merthyr Tydfil district, Blaenau Gwent district less Llanelly community, Daren Valley, New Tredegar and Rhymney communities from Rhymney Valley district
Mid Wales	Montgomeryshire and Radnorshire districts, Brecknock district less Ystradgynlais and Tawe Uchaf communities, the community of Llanelly from Blaenau Gwent district.
Monmouthshire	Monmouth district
Newport	Newport district
Pembrokeshire	Preseli Pembrokeshire and South Pembrokeshire districts
Swansea	Lliw Valley and Swansea districts
Torfaen	Torfaen district
Vale of Glamorgan	Vale of Glamorgan district, the communities of Coychurch, Ewenny, St Bride's Major, Wick from Ogwr district
West Glamorgan	Neath, Port Talbot districts, Ystradgynlais and Tawe Uchaf communities from Brecknock district
Wrexham	Wrexham Maelor district

In May 1993, a cabinet reshuffle led to John Redwood replacing David Hunt as Welsh Secretary. In November 1993, the reorganisation was put back by a year to 1 April 1996 to allow more time for consultation. The Glamorgan Valleys authority was to be renamed as Rhondda Cynon Taff, and a number of boundary changes were made. Following representations, the Heads of Valleys area was split into Merthyr Tydfil and Blaenau Gwent, each approximating to an existing district increasing the number of unitary authorities to twenty-two:

Following the debates in Parliament and in Wales generally, I have decided that there is a good case for a unitary Merthyr and a unitary Blaenau Gwent. Although I am reluctant to increase the number of authorities in the Bill, I understand the differences between Merthyr and its proposed partner in Blaenau Gwent. I understand Merthyr's long, proud history and its former status as a county borough. Its size, which is comparable to that of Cardiganshire and Anglesey, also works in its favour.

The Local Government (Wales) Bill was introduced to the Commons in June 1994. The debate on the bill led to a number of opposition amendments which sought to increase the number of councils, with representations being made by Members of Parliament for the affected areas. None of these amendments was successful and the bill was passed by both houses and received royal assent on 5 July 1994.

== Provisions ==
The act established, from 1 April 1996, twenty-two new unitary authority areas, to be known as 'counties' or 'county boroughs', and abolished the eight local government counties and 37 districts that had been formed in 1974. "Preserved counties", based on the previous local government counties as established in 1974, were created for the purposes of lieutenancy and shrievality.

The act also gives the legal definition of the territory of Wales: defined by the combined area of Welsh counties under section 20 of Local Government Act 1972. The counties were reorganised by the Local Government (Wales) Act 1994 but the territorial definition of Wales remained unchanged.

Each new unitary authority area was to have an elected council and be divided into electoral districts, each returning one councillor. The entire council of each area was to be elected every four years, with the first election in 1995.

Section 245 of the Local Government Act 1972 allowed local government districts to petition the Privy Council in order to acquire borough status. As the 1994 act abolished the districts in Wales, it inserted a section 245A in the 1972 act to allow the new unitary authority areas which did not have the status of a borough to acquire it. As the only unitary authority areas that are not already styled as 'boroughs' are styled as 'counties', this leads to the curious provision that a council can petition for its county to become a county borough.

The Secretary of State was empowered to direct a council to make a decentralisation scheme, with area committees being formed of all the councillors for a specified area. This provision has been used to create, for example, area committees for Brecknockshire, Montgomeryshire and Radnorshire in Powys, and the Arfon, Dwyfor and Meirionnydd in Gwynedd.

Schedule 1 to the act listed the new counties and county boroughs:

Counties

English name	Welsh name	Area
Anglesey	Sir Fôn	The district of Ynys Môn – Isle of Anglesey.
Caernarfonshire and Merionethshire	Sir Gaernarfon a Meirionnydd	The districts of Arfon, Dwyfor, and Meirionnydd.
Cardiff	Caerdydd	The district of Cardiff, together with (from the district of Taff-Ely) the community of Pentyrch.
Cardiganshire	Sir Aberteifi	The district of Ceredigion.
Carmarthenshire	Sir Gaerfyrddin	The districts of Carmarthen, Llanelli and Dinefwr.
Denbighshire	Sir Ddinbych	The district of Rhuddlan, together with (from the district of Glyndwr) the communities of Aberwheeler, Cynwyd, Llandrillo, Henllan, Denbigh, Llandyrnog, Llangynhafal, Llanynys, Llanrhaeadr-yng-Nghinmeirch, Nantglyn, Cyffylliog, Ruthin, Llanbedr Dyffryn Clwyd, Llanferres, Clocaenog, Efenechtyd, Llandegla, Llanfair Dyffryn Clwyd, Llanarmon-yn-Iajl, Llanelidan, Derwen, Betws Gwerfil Goch, Gwyddelwern, Bryneglwys, Corwen, Llantysilio, Llangollen and Llangollen Rural with (from the district of Colwyn) the communities of Trefnant and Cefnmeiriadog.
Flintshire	Sir y Fflint	The districts of Alyn and Deeside and Delyn.
Monmouthshire	Sir Fynwy	The district of Monmouth together with (from the district of Blaenau Gwent) the community of Llanelly.
Pembrokeshire	Sir Benfro	The districts of Preseli Pembrokeshire and South Pembrokeshire, together with Caldey Island and St Margaret's Island.
Powys	Powys	The districts of Montgomeryshire, Radnorshire and Brecknock, together with (from the district of Glyndwr) the communities of Llanrhaeadr-ym-Mochnant, Llansilin and Llangedwyn.
Swansea	Abertawe	The district of Swansea, together with (from the district of Lliw Valley) the communities of Gowerton, Llwchwr, Gorseinon, Grovesend, Pontardulais, Mawr, Pont-Lliw, Penllergaer, Llangyfelach and Clydach.

Caernarfonshire and Merionethshire was subsequently renamed as Gwynedd and Cardiganshire was renamed Ceredigion by their respective councils.

County boroughs

English name	Welsh name	Area
Aberconwy and Colwyn	Aberconwy a Cholwyn	The districts of Aberconwy and Colwyn, but excluding (from the district of Colwyn) the communities of Cefnmeiriadog and Trefnant.
Blaenau Gwent	Blaenau Gwent	The district of Blaenau Gwent (excluding the community of Llanelly).
Bridgend	Pen-y-bont ar Ogwr	The district of Ogwr, but excluding the communities of Wick, St Bride's Major and Ewenny.
Caerphilly	Caerffili	The districts of Islwyn and Rhymney Valley.
Merthyr Tydfil	Merthyr Tudful	The district of Merthyr Tydfil.
Neath and Port Talbot	Castell-nedd a Phort Talbot	The districts of Neath and Port Talbot, together with (from the district of Lliw Valley) the communities of Pontardawe, Gwaun-Cae-Gurwen, Cwmllynfell, Ystalyfera and Cilybebyll.
Newport	Casnewydd	The district of Newport.
Rhondda, Cynon, Taf	Rhondda, Cynon, Taf	The districts of Rhondda, Cynon Valley, and Taff-Ely, but excluding (from the district of Taff-Ely) the community of Pentyrch.
Torfaen	Tor-faen	The district of Torfaen.
The Vale of Glamorgan	Bro Morgannwg	The district of Vale of Glamorgan, together with (from the district of Ogwr) the communities of Wick, St Bride's Major and Ewenny.
Wrexham	Wrecsam	The district of Wrexham Maelor, together with (from the district of Glyndŵr) the communities of Chirk, Glyntraian, Llansantffraid Glyn Ceiriog, and Ceiriog Ucha.

Aberconwy and Colwyn was subsequently renamed Conwy and Neath and Port Talbot was renamed as Neath Port Talbot by their respective councils.

== See also ==
- Subdivisions of Wales
