= Counties of Wales =

The counties of Wales may refer to:

- Some principal areas of Wales; of twenty-two, eleven are styled as "counties" and the rest as "county boroughs", though together they may be called "counties" unofficially
- Preserved counties of Wales, used for ceremonial purposes
- Former administrative counties of Wales (those prior to 1996); see History of local government in Wales
- Historic counties of Wales

Maps:

Principal areas of Wales (since 1996)

Preserved counties of Wales (since 1996)

1974–1996 counties of Wales

Historic counties of Wales (until 1974)
