= Districts of Wales =

Former second-tier subdivision in Wales

Districts (Wales)
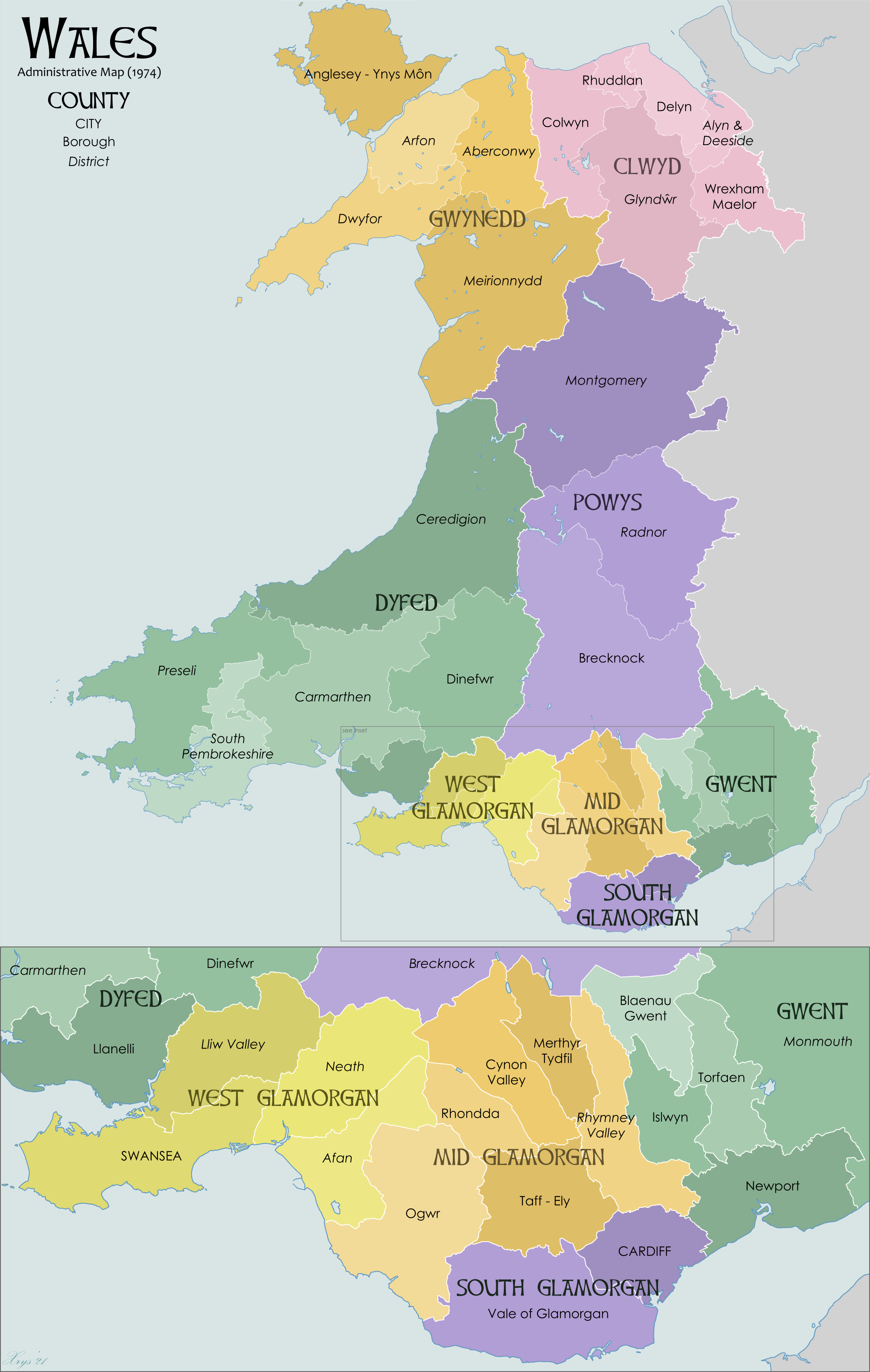
- Category: Districts
- Location: Wales
- Found in: Counties
- Created by: Local Government Act 1972
- Created: 1 April 1974
- Abolished by: Local Government (Wales) Act 1994
- Abolished: 1 April 1996
- Possible status: City; Borough

The districts of Wales were a form of local government in Wales used between 1974 and 1996. There were thirty-seven districts, and they were the second tier of local government introduced by the Local Government Act 1972, being subdivisions of the eight counties introduced at the same time. This system of two-tier local government was abolished in 1996 and replaced with the current system of unitary principal areas.

Each district was administered by an elected district council. The council was entitled to petition for a charter granting borough status, whereupon the district became a borough and the district council a borough council headed by a mayor. In addition, a district could be granted letters patent granting city status.

For the list of districts before 1974, see List of rural and urban districts in Wales in 1973.

== Districts 1974–1996 ==
Code	District	Status	County	Area 1974	Population estimate 1974	Population estimate 1992	Headquarters	Successor UA
GD4	Aberconwy	Borough	Gwynedd	149,738 acres (605.97 km^{2})	49,730	54,100	Llandudno	Conwy
C4	Alyn and Deeside	District	Clwyd	38,104 acres (154.20 km^{2})	68,280	74,500	Hawarden	Flintshire
GD1	Anglesey - Ynys Môn	Borough	Gwynedd	176,638 acres (714.83 km^{2})	62,020	69,300	Llangefni	Isle of Anglesey
GD3	Arfon	Borough	Gwynedd	101,207 acres (409.57 km^{2})	53,640	56,100	Bangor	Gwynedd
GT3	Blaenau Gwent	Borough	Gwent	31,318 acres (126.74 km^{2})	84,080	76,900	Ebbw Vale	Blaenau Gwent, Monmouthshire
P3	Brecknock	Borough	Powys	443,382 acres (1,794.30 km^{2})	37,120	41,500	Brecon	Powys
SG1	Cardiff	City	South Glamorgan	29,633 acres (119.92 km^{2})	285,760	295,600	Cardiff	Cardiff
D4	Carmarthen	District	Dyfed	291,192 acres (1,178.41 km^{2})	49,910	56,200	Carmarthen	Carmarthenshire
D1	Ceredigion	District	Dyfed	443,182 acres (1,793.49 km^{2})	55,430	67,900	Aberystwyth	Ceredigion
C1	Colwyn	Borough	Clwyd	136,566 acres (552.66 km^{2})	45,990	56,400	Colwyn Bay	Conwy, Denbighshire
MG3	Cynon Valley	Borough	Mid Glamorgan	44,639 acres (180.65 km^{2})	69,630	65,600	Aberdare	Rhondda Cynon Taf
C3	Delyn	Borough	Clwyd	6,870 acres (27.8 km^{2})	59,440	69,700	Flint	Flintshire
D6	Dinefwr	Borough	Dyfed	239,868 acres (970.71 km^{2})	36,140	38,700	Llandeilo	Carmarthenshire
GD2	Dwyfor	District	Gwynedd	152,753 acres (618.17 km^{2})	25,870	27,300	Pwllheli	Gwynedd
C5	Glyndŵr	District	Clwyd	238,686 acres (965.93 km^{2})	38,450	42,000	Ruthin	Denbighshire, Powys, Wrexham
GT2	Islwyn	Borough	Gwent	24,362 acres (98.59 km^{2})	66,140	67,200	Blackwood	Caerphilly
D5	Llanelli	Borough	Dyfed	57,737 acres (233.65 km^{2})	76,720	74,600	Llanelli	Carmarthenshire
WG2	Lliw Valley	Borough	West Glamorgan	52,818 acres (213.75 km^{2})	57,460	64,200	Penllergaer	Neath Port Talbot, Swansea
GD5	Meirionnydd	District	Gwynedd	374,912 acres (1,517.22 km^{2})	30,830	32,900	Dolgellau	Gwynedd
MG4	Merthyr Tydfil	Borough	Mid Glamorgan	27,584 acres (111.63 km^{2})	61,490	60,100	Merthyr Tydfil	Merthyr Tydfil
GT5	Monmouth	District; Borough from 1988	Gwent	203,438 acres (823.28 km^{2})	66,090	76,700	Pontypool^{a}	Monmouthshire
P1	Montgomery, renamed Montgomeryshire 1986	District	Powys	510,109 acres (2,064.34 km^{2})	43,580	53,700	Newtown	Powys
WG3	Neath	Borough	West Glamorgan	50,971 acres (206.27 km^{2})	66,150	66,300	Neath	Neath Port Talbot
GT1	Newport	Borough	Gwent	49,558 acres (200.55 km^{2})	135,910	137,200	Newport	Newport
MG1	Ogwr	Borough	Mid Glamorgan	70,444 acres (285.08 km^{2})	126,570	134,200	Bridgend	Bridgend, Vale of Glamorgan
WG4	Afan, renamed Port Talbot on 1 January 1986	Borough	West Glamorgan	37,371 acres (151.24 km^{2})	58,580	51,100	Port Talbot	Neath Port Talbot
D2	Preseli, renamed Preseli Pembrokeshire on 1 April 1987	District	Dyfed	258,075 acres (1,044.39 km^{2})	61,700	71,200	Haverfordwest	Pembrokeshire
P2	Radnor, renamed Radnorshire on 8 May 1989	District	Powys	301,165 acres (1,218.77 km^{2})	18,670	24,000	Llandrindod Wells	Powys
MG2	Rhondda	Borough	Mid Glamorgan	23,882 acres (96.65 km^{2})	87,710	79,300	Pentre	Rhondda Cynon Taf
C2	Rhuddlan	Borough	Clwyd	26,860 acres (108.7 km^{2})	49,920	55,000	Rhyl	Denbighshire
MG5	Rhymney Valley	District	Mid Glamorgan	43,522 acres (176.13 km^{2})	103,800	104,000	Hengoed	Caerphilly
D3	South Pembrokeshire	District	Dyfed	134,640 acres (544.9 km^{2})	37,060	42,700	Pembroke Dock	Pembrokeshire
WG1	Swansea	City	West Glamorgan	60,504 acres (244.85 km^{2})	190,370	189,400	Swansea	Swansea
MG6	Taff-Ely	Borough	Mid Glamorgan	41,632 acres (168.48 km^{2})	86,880	99,700	Pontypridd	Cardiff, Rhondda Cynon Taf
GT4	Torfaen	Borough	Gwent	31,258 acres (126.50 km^{2})	88,870	91,300	Pontypool	Torfaen
SG2	Vale of Glamorgan	Borough	South Glamorgan	73,198 acres (296.22 km^{2})	106,490	114,800	Barry	Vale of Glamorgan
C6	Wrexham Maelor	Borough	Clwyd	90,569 acres (366.52 km^{2})	106,800	117,200	Wrexham	Wrexham

^a Outside the district.
