= Bedwellty Greyhound Track =

Former greyhound racing track in Wales

- Location: Bedwellty, near Aberbargoed South Wales
- Coordinates: 51°41′50″N 3°12′29″W
- Opened: 1929
- Closed: 2007

Bedwellty Greyhound Track was a greyhound racing track in the hamlet of Bedwellty, near Aberbargoed, South Wales. It was sometimes called Bedwellty Park.

The track was situated behind the Church Inn, north of the Bedwellty Road and east of Aberbargoed. It was larger than the hamlet of Bedwellty itself and was situated at a high altitude not far from the Brecon Beacons.

Racing began in 1929 on Monday and Friday evenings. The track was independent (unaffiliated to a governing body) and race distances were over 300, 510 and 700 yards with the circuit being described as suiting early paced well balanced dogs. There was car parking for 150 vehicles and on-course bookmakers.

In 1995, Noel Watkins bought the track. He leased it to bookmakers Alan Davies and Trevor Jones in 1998.

In 2007, after 78 years of racing, the stadium closed.
