= Principal areas of Wales =

Subdivisions of Wales; counties and county boroughs

Principal areas of Wales Prif ardaloedd Cymru (Welsh)
- Map of the 22 principal areas of Wales
- Category: Unitary authority areas
- Location: Wales
- Created: 1 April 1996
- Number: 22
- Possible types: County (11); County borough (11)
- Government: County / County Borough council
- Subdivisions: Community Electoral wards

The principal areas of Wales, comprising the counties and county boroughs of Wales, are a form of subdivision in Wales. There are currently 22 principal areas in Wales, and they were established in 1996. They are a single-tier form of local government, each governed by a principal council, with eleven styled as a "county" (sir) and the other eleven as a "county borough" (bwrdeistref sirol). They replaced the previous two-tier system of eight counties and 37 districts that were in place in Wales from 1974 to 1996.

== Description ==
For local government, Wales is divided into 22 sub-divisions collectively called "principal areas" in the 1994 act. They may be styled as either a "county" or a "county borough". Each principal area is overseen by a "principal council", which may also adopt their principal area style, being called a "county council" (Welsh: cyngor sir) or a "county borough council" (Welsh: cyngor bwrdeistref sirol). Although four principal areas, Cardiff, Swansea, Newport and Wrexham, have since obtained city status, therefore they may style their principal councils as a "city council" instead.

The basic framework of local government and specifically a council's constitution and general powers were set out in the Local Government Act 1972, which simplified the existing local governing structure in Wales that existed prior. The later Local Government (Wales) Act 1994 restructured local government, by significantly amending the previous act. The councils of the principal areas are generally supervised by the Welsh Government.

The names of the principal areas, in both English and Welsh, are set out in the 1994 amended version of the 1972 act, under Schedule 4. Section 74 of the 1972 act allows principal councils to change their names, if there is a two-third majority support for such in a specially convened meeting. Since their establishment, multiple councils have pursued a name change. Any notice of a name change has to be submitted to the Welsh Ministers and the Democracy and Boundary Commission Cymru. The 1972 changes were enacted in 1974 by the then Conservative administration.

The principal areas' councils are unitary, and are sub-divided into communities and electoral wards.

Some of the principal areas have county borough status, a largely historical status that reflects their historical existence as major population centres. The eleven county boroughs of Wales are Blaenau Gwent, Bridgend, Caerphilly, Conwy, Merthyr Tydfil, Neath Port Talbot, Newport, Rhondda Cynon Taf, Torfaen, Vale of Glamorgan and Wrexham. County borough status does not award any different rights compared to the other counties. The 1994 act stated they should not be treated as a "borough" as defined by earlier legislation.

The other eleven have county status, and are styled as "counties". Four principal areas, Cardiff, Swansea, Newport and Wrexham, also have city status.

The principal areas' boundaries are made up of its electoral wards, and the average number of electoral wards in a principal area is 40.

=== Name changes ===
Five of the principal areas use different names to those given in the Local Government (Wales) Act 1994. In each case the council renamed the area immediately, with the changes taking effect on 2 April 1996. The changes were:

- Conwy from "Aberconwy and Colwyn"
- Isle of Anglesey from "Anglesey"
- Gwynedd from "Caernarfonshire and Merionethshire"
- Ceredigion from "Cardiganshire"

Other simpler changes also took place such as:

- Neath Port Talbot from "Neath and Port Talbot"
- Rhondda Cynon Taf from "Rhondda, Cynon, Taff" or "Rhondda Cynon Taff"

=== Boundary changes ===
The following changes to principal areas have been made since 1996:

- Llangollen Rural, was originally in entirely in Denbighshire, but part was transferred to Wrexham County Borough on 1 April 1997.
- Parts Ewenny and Llangan in the Vale of Glamorgan were transferred to the county borough of Bridgend on 1 April 1997.
- Part of the community of Rhymney in Caerphilly in the area of Tafarnau-bach become part of the community of Tredegar in Blaenau Gwent on 6 April 2002.
- Part of Pontardawe in Neath Port Talbot became part of the community of Clydach in Swansea on 6 April 2002.
- Part of the community of Michaelston in Vale of Glamorgan was transferred to the community of Grangetown in Cardiff on 1 April 2003.
- St Dogmaels was transferred from Ceredigion to Pembrokeshire on 1 April 2003.
- Clynderwen, and parts of Cilymaenllwyd and Henllanfallteg, originally in Carmarthenshire, but was transferred to Pembrokeshire on 1 April 2003.
- Part of Talybont-on-Usk in Powys was transferred to Vaynor in Merthyr Tydfil on 1 June 2009.

== History ==
Following the enacting of the Local Government (Wales) Act 1994, the pre-existing eight counties of Wales (now largely the ceremonial preserved counties of Wales) and its 37 districts in place since 1974 were replaced on 1 April 1996, with 22 unitary authorities, the "principal areas".

In 2014, plans were announced to reform local government in Wales, reducing the number of principal areas from 22 to a smaller number of unitary authorities, similar to the counties that they replaced in 1996.

During the COVID-19 pandemic in Wales in 2020, the principal areas were used as a basis for local lockdowns.

== List ==
Principal areas of Wales
Names		Style	Date created	Land area		Population (2025)	Density		Administrative centre
English	Welsh	Style	Date created	(km^{2})	(mi^{2})	Population (2025)	(/km^{2})	(/mi^{2})	Administrative centre
Isle of Anglesey	Ynys Môn	County	1996 (Note: Re-instated as a principal administrative authority after a gap)	712	275	68,607	96	250	Llangefni
Blaenau Gwent		County borough	1996	109	42	67,593	622	1,610	Ebbw Vale
Bridgend	Pen-y-bont ar Ogwr	County borough	1996	251	97	146,986	586	1,520	Bridgend
Caerphilly	Caerffili	County borough	1996	277	107	176,078	635	1,640	Ystrad Mynach
Cardiff	Caerdydd	County, city	1996	141	54	381,516	2,707	7,010	Cardiff
Carmarthenshire	Sir Gaerfyrddin	County	1996	2,370	920	190,037	80	210	Carmarthen
Ceredigion (Note: Named as 'Cardiganshire' in legislation. Name changed by the council.)		County	1996	1,785	689	72,696	41	110	Aberaeron and Aberystwyth
Conwy (Note: Named as 'Aberconwy and Colwyn' in legislation. Name changed by the council.)		County borough	1996	1,126	435	114,421	102	260	Conwy
Denbighshire	Sir Ddinbych	County	1996 (Note: Re-instated as a principal administrative authority after a gap. Boundaries significantly altered in 1996 from its previous incarnation.)	837	323	98,247	117	300	Ruthin
Flintshire	Sir y Fflint	County	1996	440	170	155,954	355	920	Mold
Gwynedd (Note: Named as 'Caernarfonshire and Merionethshire' in legislation. Name changed by the council.)		County	1974 (Note: Boundaries significantly altered in 1996 from its previous incarnation.)	2,535	979	120,295	47	120	Caernarfon
Merthyr Tydfil	Merthyr Tudful	County borough	1996	111	43	58,362	524	1,360	Merthyr Tydfil
Monmouthshire	Sir Fynwy	County	1996	849	328	95,329	112	290	Usk
Neath Port Talbot (Note: Named as 'Neath and Port Talbot' in legislation. Name changed by the council.)	Castell-nedd Port Talbot	County borough	1996	441	170	142,028	322	830	Port Talbot
Newport	Casnewydd	County borough, city	1996	190	73	168,584	885	2,290	Newport
Pembrokeshire	Sir Benfro	County	1996	1,618	625	125,849	78	200	Haverfordwest
Powys		County	1974	5,181	2,000	134,843	26	67	Llandrindod Wells
Rhondda Cynon Taf		County borough	1996	424	164	241,015	568	1,470	Pontypridd
Swansea	Abertawe	County, city	1996	378	146	249,429	661	1,710	Swansea
Torfaen		County borough	1996	126	49	93,973	748	1,940	Pontypool
Vale of Glamorgan	Bro Morgannwg	County borough	1996	331	128	135,362	409	1,060	Barry
Wrexham	Wrecsam	County borough, city	1996	504	195	137,977	274	710	Wrexham

== Map ==
Map of the 22 principal areas of Wales. County boroughs are italicised.

== List of principal areas in 1994 act ==
List of principal areas set out in the Local Government (Wales) Act 1994
Principal area		Comprising (in 1996)
Current name(s)	Initial name(s) in 1994 Act	Districts (and specific communities)
Counties
Isle of Anglesey (Welsh: Ynys Môn)	Anglesey (Welsh: Sir Fôn)	Ynys Môn – Isle of Anglesey
Gwynedd	Caernarfonshire and Merionethshire (Welsh: Sir Gaernarfon a Meirionnydd)	Arfon; Dwyfor; Meirionnydd
Cardiff (Welsh: Caerdydd)		Cardiff; parts of Taff-Ely: Pentyrch
Ceredigion	Cardiganshire (Welsh: Sir Aberteifi)	Ceredigion
Carmarthenshire (Welsh: Sir Gaerfyrddin)		Carmarthen; Llanelli; Dinefwr
Denbighshire (Welsh: Sir Ddinbych)		Rhuddlan; parts of Glyndŵr; Aberwheeler; Betws Gwerfil Goch; Bryneglwys; Clocaenog; Corwen; Cyffylliog; Cynwyd; Denbigh; Derwen; Efenechtyd; Gwyddelwern; Henllan; Llanbedr Dyffryn Clwyd; Llandegla; Llandrillo; Llandyrnog; Llanelidan; Llanfair Dyffryn Clwyd; Llangollen; Llangollen Rural; Llangynhafal; Llanrhaeadr-yng-Nghinmeirch; Llanferres; Llanynys; Llanarmon-yn-Iâl; Llantysilio; Nantglyn; Ruthin; parts from Colwyn; Cefnmeiradog; Trefnant
Flintshire (Welsh: Sir y Fflint)		Alyn and Deeside; Delyn
Monmouthshire (Welsh: Sir Fynwy)		Monmouth; parts of Blaenau Gwent; Llanelly
Pembrokeshire (Welsh: Sir Benfro)		Preseli Pembrokeshire; South Pembrokeshire; Caldey Island; St Margaret's Island
Powys		Montgomeryshire; Radnorshire; Brecknock; parts of Glyndŵr; Llanrhaeadr-ym-Mochnant; Llansilin; Llangedwyn
Swansea (Welsh: Abertawe)		Swansea; parts of Lliw Valley; Clydach; Gorseinon; Gowerton; Grovesend; Llangyfelach; Llwchwr; Mawr; Penllergaer; Pontardulais; Pont-Lliw
County boroughs
Conwy	Aberconwy and Colwyn (Welsh: Aberconwy a Cholwyn)	Aberconwy; all of Colwyn; except: Cefnmeiriadog; Trefnant
Blaenau Gwent		all of Blaenau Gwent: except: Llanelly
Bridgend (Welsh: Pen-y-bont ar Ogwr)		all of Ogwr: except: Ewenny; St Bride's Major; Wick
Caerphilly (Welsh: Caerffili)		Islwyn; Rhymney Valley
Merthyr Tydfil (Welsh: Merthyr Tudful)		Merthyr Tydfil
Neath Port Talbot (Welsh: Castell-nedd Port Talbot)	Neath and Port Talbot (Welsh: Castell-nedd a Phort Talbot)	Neath; Port Talbot; parts of Lliw Valley; Cilybebyll; Cwmllynfell; Gwaun-Cae-Gurwen; Pontardawe; Ystalyfera
Newport (Welsh: Casnewydd)		Newport
Rhondda Cynon Taf	Rhondda, Cynon, Taff (Welsh: Rhondda, Cynon, Taf)	Rhondda; Cynon Valley; all of Taff-Ely; except: Pentyrch
Torfaen (Welsh: Tor-faen)		Torfaen
The Vale of Glamorgan (Welsh: Bro Morgannwg)		Vale of Glamorgan; parts of Ogwr; Ewenny; St Bride's Major; Wick
Wrexham (Welsh: Wrecsam)		Wrexham Maelor; parts of Glyndŵr; Ceiriog Ucha; Chirk; Glyntraian; Llansantffraid Glyn Ceiriog

== See also ==
- List of Welsh principal areas
- List of Welsh areas by percentage of Welsh-speakers
