= Caerleon Urban District =

Former district in historic Monmouthshire, Wales

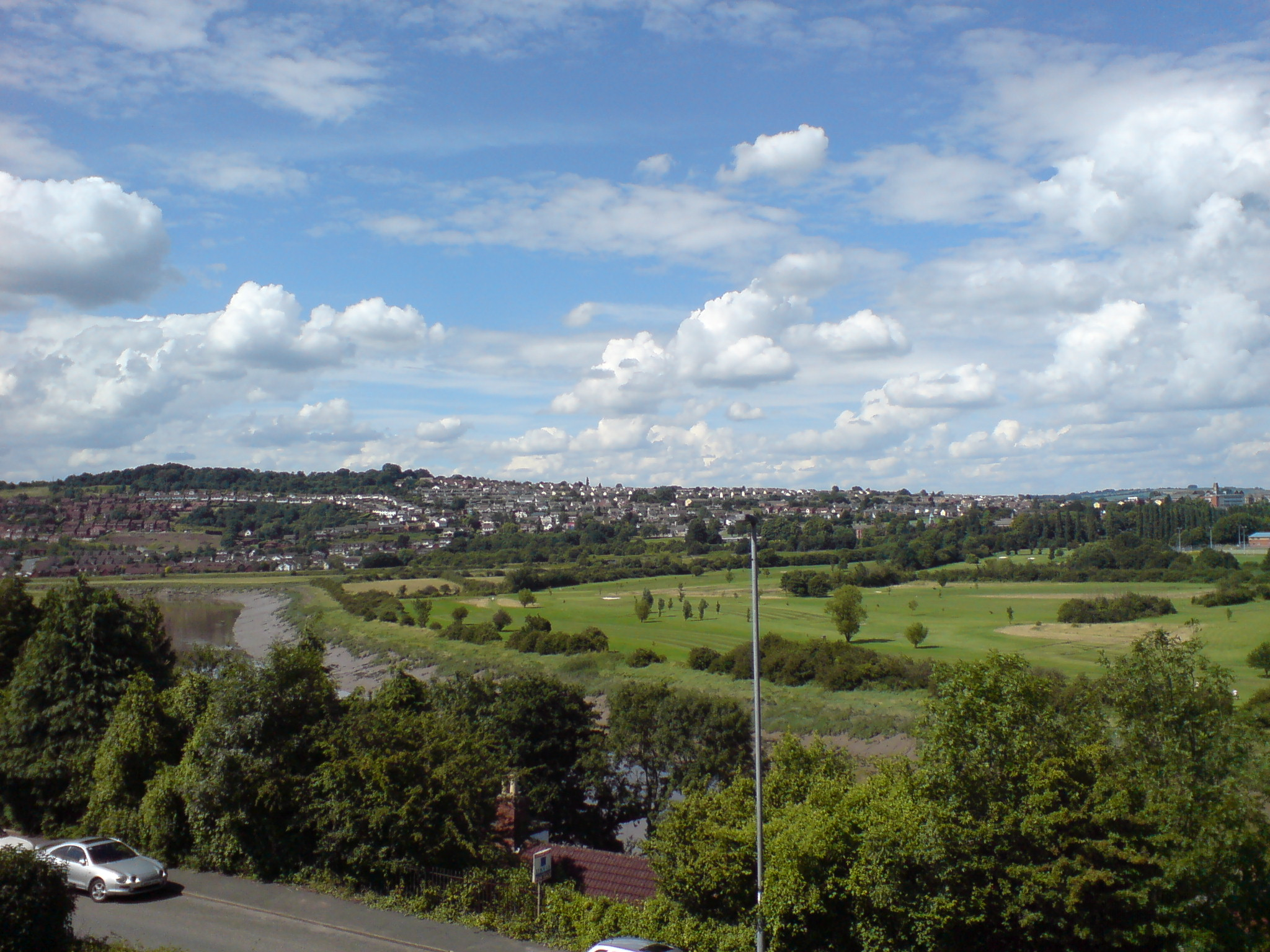
- Area
  - Coordinates: 51.605°N 2.95°W
- Population
  - 1911: 2,046
  - 1971: 6,267
- History
  - Created: 1894
  - Abolished: 1974
  - Succeeded by: Newport district
- Status: Urban District
  - HQ: Caerleon

Caerleon Urban District was a local government district in Wales, until 1974, with a district council. It was established under the provisions of the Local Government Act 1894 and comprised the parishes of Caerleon and Christchurch in the administrative county of Monmouthshire.

The Urban District Council comprised a number of councillors and a chairman and initially took over the powers of the Local Board of Health, formed in 1872. The Council's responsibilities included sanitary services, sewerage, refuse collection, housing, streets, cemeteries, libraries, parks, controls on buildings such as petrol stations, and licensing of public entertainments. The council was administered by a number of committees and by appointed officers including a Clerk, Treasurer, Medical Officer of Health, Surveyor and Sanitary Inspector. The area of the urban district was greatly increased in area by the County of Monmouth Review Order 1935, from 571 to 3,256 acres (13 km^{2}) by annexing parts of the abolished Magor Rural District and Llantarnam Urban District. Caerleon Urban District was incorporated into the Newport district in 1974.

== See also ==
- List of rural and urban districts in Wales in 1973
