= Mid Glamorgan =

Preserved county in Wales

Coordinates: 51.816°N 3.368°W

Mid Glamorgan Welsh: Morgannwg Ganol
- Mid Glamorgan shown within Wales as a preserved county
- Area
  - 2003: 781 km^{2} (302 sq mi)
  - 2024: 786 km²
- Population
  - 2024: 449,346
- History
  - Created: 1974
  - Abolished: 1996
  - Succeeded by: Bridgend; Merthyr Tydfil; Rhondda Cynon Taf; Caerphilly; Preserved county of Mid Glamorgan
- Status: Non-metropolitan county (1974–1996) Preserved county (1996–)
- Government: Mid Glamorgan County Council
  - HQ: County Hall, Cathays Park, Cardiff (extraterritorial)
- Coat of arms of Mid Glamorgan County Council
- Subdivisions
  - Type: Non-metropolitan districts
  - Units: 1. Cynon Valley; 2. Ogwr; 3. Merthyr Tydfil; 4. Rhondda; 5. Rhymney Valley; 6. Taff-Ely

Mid Glamorgan (Welsh: Morgannwg Ganol) is a preserved county of Wales. From 1974 until 1996 it was also an administrative county with a county council.

Mid Glamorgan was formed in 1974 under the Local Government Act 1972. It consisted of part of the former administrative county of Glamorgan and the county borough of Merthyr Tydfil, along with the parishes of Penderyn and Vaynor from Brecknockshire and the urban districts of Bedwas and Machen, Rhymney and part of Bedwellty, from Monmouthshire.

It was divided into six districts:

- Cynon Valley
- Ogwr
- Merthyr Tydfil
- Rhondda
- Rhymney Valley
- Taff-Ely

Mid Glamorgan and its component districts were abolished in 1996 and the area split into the unitary authorities of Bridgend, Merthyr Tydfil, Rhondda Cynon Taf and part of Caerphilly as a result of the Local Government (Wales) Act 1994.

The communities of Wick, St Brides Major, Ewenny (from the Ogwr district) became part of the Vale of Glamorgan county borough, while Pentyrch (from the Taff-Ely district) was added to the Cardiff unitary authority area. Because of this, they became part of the preserved county of South Glamorgan. In 2003 the ceremonial borders were further adjusted, placing the entire Caerphilly county borough in the ceremonial county of Gwent.

The Mid Glamorgan County Council's offices were located in the Glamorgan Building (the former headquarters of Glamorgan County Council) in Cathays Park, Cardiff and also in nearby Greyfriars Road, both outside the Mid Glamorgan boundaries.

The county council's coat of arms was very similar to that of the previous council of Glamorganshire : Or, three chevronels gules between two clarions of the last in chief, and in base a Tudor rose barbed and seeded proper. The crest, as with Glamorganshire, was the same Welsh dragon rising from flames, only this time supporting a flag bearing three chevronels from the arms of Iestyn ap Gwrgant, the last ruler of the old Kingdom of Morgannwg. The coalminer and steel worker were retained as the supporters of the arms, but with their positions reversed. The motto A Ddioddefws A Orfu or "He Who suffered, conquered" was also retained from Glamorganshire.

== See also ==
- List of electoral wards in Mid Glamorgan
- High Sheriff of Mid Glamorgan
