= Borough status in the United Kingdom =

Honorary local government status

Borough status is granted by royal charter to local government districts in England, Wales and Northern Ireland. The status is purely honorary, and does not give any additional powers to the council or inhabitants of the district. In Scotland, similarly chartered communities were known as royal burghs, although the status is no longer granted.

== Origins of borough status ==
Until the local government reforms of 1973 and 1974, boroughs were towns possessing charters of incorporation conferring considerable powers, and were governed by a municipal corporation headed by a mayor. The corporations had been reformed by legislation beginning in 1835 (1840 in Ireland). By the time of their abolition there were three types:

- County boroughs
- Municipal or non-county boroughs
- Rural boroughs

Many of the older boroughs could trace their origin to medieval charters or were boroughs by prescription, with Saxon origins. Most of the boroughs created after 1835 were new industrial, resort or suburban towns that had grown up after the Industrial Revolution. Borough corporations could also have the status of a city.

== Modern borough status ==
=== England and Wales ===
Borough status no longer implies a town or urban area. Outside Greater London, borough status is granted to metropolitan and non-metropolitan districts under the provisions of section 245 of the Local Government Act 1972. This section allows the council of a district to petition the monarch for a charter granting borough status. The resolution must have the support of at least two-thirds of the councillors. Having received the petition the monarch may, on the advice of the Privy Council, grant a charter whereupon:

- The district becomes a borough
- The district council becomes the borough council
- The chairman and vice-chairman become entitled to the style mayor and deputy mayor of the borough, except in councils that have an elected mayor under the Local Government Act 2000.

Charters granted under the 1972 act may allow the borough council to appoint "local officers of dignity" previously appointed by an abolished borough corporation. Examples include:

- Honorary recorder: some borough and city councils have the right to appoint a circuit judge or recorder appointed under the Courts Act 1971 as honorary recorder. Usually this is the senior judge in the council's area.
- Sheriff: These are appointed in a number of boroughs and cities that were formerly counties corporate.
- High steward: originally a judicial office, often held by a peer, now entirely ceremonial.

There is no obligation on the council to appoint persons to these positions.

In some boroughs the mayor has the additional title as "Admiral of the Port", recalling a historic jurisdiction. The lord mayors of Chester and Kingston-upon-Hull are admirals of the Dee and the Humber respectively, the Mayor of Medway is Admiral of the River Medway, and the mayors of Poole and Southampton are admirals of those ports.

Privileges or rights belonging to citizens or burgesses of a former borough can be transferred to the inhabitants of the new borough.

Borough councils are permitted to pass a resolution admitting "persons of distinction" and persons who have "rendered eminent service" to be an honorary freeman of the borough. This power has been used to grant honorary freedom not only to individuals, but to units and ships of the armed forces.

==== England ====
‡: and city status

Borough charters granted under section 245 of the Local Government Act 1972 to metropolitan and non-metropolitan districts of England
| District | Year of charter | Previous boroughs | Notes |
|---|---|---|---|
| Allerdale | 4 June 1992 | Workington (1883) | Charter trustees for Workington had existed 1974 to 1982. Abolished 2023. |
| Amber Valley | 17 May 1989 | None | |
| Ashford | 1 April 1974 | Tenterden (reformed 1835) | Tenterden formed a town council in 1974 |
| Barnsley | 1 April 1974 | Barnsley (1869) | |
| Barrow-in-Furness | 1 April 1974 | Barrow-in-Furness (1867) | Abolished 2023 |
| Basildon | 26 October 2010 | None | |
| Basingstoke and Deane | 20 January 1978 | Basingstoke (reformed 1835) | Basingstoke had charter trustees 1974–1978 |
| Bath | 1 April 1974 ‡ | Bath (reformed 1835) | Abolished 1996 |
| Bedford | See North Bedfordshire | | |
| Berwick-upon-Tweed | 1 April 1974 | Berwick-upon-Tweed (reformed 1835) | Abolished in April 2009. Civic functions transferred to Berwick-upon-Tweed Town Council. |
| Beverley | 1 April 1974 | Beverley (reformed 1835) | Renamed East Yorkshire Borough of Beverley 1981. Abolished 1996. |
| Birmingham | 1 April 1974 ‡ | Birmingham (1838), Sutton Coldfield (1885) | |
| Blackburn | 1 April 1974 | Blackburn (1851), Darwen (1878) | Renamed Blackburn with Darwen 1997 |
| Blackpool | 1 April 1974 | Blackpool (1876) | |
| Blyth Valley | 1 April 1974 | Blyth (1922) | Abolished in April 2009. |
| Bolton | 1 April 1974 | Bolton (1838) | |
| Boothferry | 28 April 1978 | Goole (1933) | Goole had charter trustees 1974–1978. Abolished 1996. |
| Boston | 1 April 1974 | Boston (reformed 1835) | |
| Bournemouth | 1 April 1974 | Bournemouth (1890) | Abolished April 2019 |
| Bracknell Forest | 27 April 1988 | None | |
| Bradford | 1 April 1974 ‡ | Bradford (1847) | |
| Brentwood | 10 March 1993 | None | |
| Brighton | 1 April 1974 | Brighton (1854) | Abolished 1997. |
| Brighton & Hove | 1 April 1997 (granted city status in 2000) | Formed from Brighton, Hove districts | |
| Bristol | 1 April 1974‡ | Bristol (reformed 1835) | |
| Broxbourne | 1 April 1974 | None | |
| Broxtowe | 10 November 1977 | None | |
| Burnley | 1 April 1974 | Burnley (1861) | |
| Bury | 1 April 1974 | Bury (1876) | |
| Calderdale | 1 April 1974 | Halifax (1848), Brighouse (1893), Todmorden (1896) | |
| Cambridge | 1 April 1974‡ | Cambridge (reformed 1835) | |
| Canterbury | 1 April 1974‡ | Canterbury (reformed 1835) | |
| Carlisle | 1 April 1974‡ | Carlisle (reformed 1835) | Abolished 2023 |
| Castle Morpeth | 1 April 1974 | Morpeth (reformed 1835) | Abolished in April 2009. |
| Castle Point | 1992 | None | |
| Charnwood | 1 April 1974 | Loughborough (1888) | |
| Chelmsford | 10 November 1977 | Chelmsford (1888) | Chelmsford had charter trustees 1974–1977 Granted city status in 2012 |
| Cheltenham | 1 April 1974 | Cheltenham (1876) | |
| Cheshire East | 1 April 2009 | Congleton, Crewe and Nantwich, Macclesfield | Created April 2009 |
| Cheshire West and Chester | 1 April 2009 | Chester, Ellesmere Port and Neston, Vale Royal | Created April 2009 |
| Chester | 1 April 1974‡ | Chester (reformed 1835) | Abolished April 2009 |
| Chesterfield | 1 April 1974 | Chesterfield (reformed 1835) | |
| Chorley | 1 April 1974 | Chorley (1881) | |
| Christchurch | 1 April 1974 | Christchurch (reformed 1886) | Abolished April 2019 |
| Cleethorpes | 11 September 1975 | Cleethorpes (1936) | Cleethorpes had charter trustees 1974–1975. Borough abolished 1996 |
| Colchester | 1 April 1974 | Colchester (reformed 1835) | Granted city status in 2022 |
| Congleton | 1 April 1974 | Congleton (reformed 1835) | Abolished April 2009 |
| Copeland | 1 April 1974 | Whitehaven (1894) | Abolished 2023 |
| Corby | 28 October 1992 | None | Abolished April 2021 |
| Coventry | 1 April 1974‡ | Coventry (reformed 1835) | |
| Crawley | 1 April 1974 | None | |
| Crewe and Nantwich | 1 April 1974 | Crewe (1877) | Abolished April 2009 |
| Dacorum | 10 October 1984 | Hemel Hempstead (1898) | Hemel Hempstead had charter trustees 1974–1984 |
| Darlington | 1 April 1974 | Darlington (1867) | |
| Dartford | 22 April 1977 | Dartford (1933) | Dartford had charter trustees 1974–1977 |
| Derby | 1 April 1974 (and city status in 1977) | Derby (reformed 1835) | |
| Doncaster | 1 April 1974 | Doncaster (reformed 1835) | Granted city status in 2022 |
| Dudley | 1 April 1974 | Dudley (1865), Stourbridge (1914), Halesowen (1936) | |
| Durham | 1 April 1974‡ | Durham and Framwellgate (reformed 1835) | Abolished April 2009. charter trustees established. |
| East Staffordshire | 11 May 1992 | Burton upon Trent (1878) | Charter trustees for Burton functioned 1974–1992. They were formally abolished in 2003. |
| East Yorkshire | See North Wolds | | |
| East Yorkshire Borough of Beverley | See Beverley | | |
| Eastbourne | 1 April 1974 | Eastbourne (1883) | |
| Eastleigh | 1 April 1974 | Eastleigh (1936) | |
| Ellesmere Port | 1 April 1974 | Ellesmere Port (1955) | renamed Ellesmere Port and Neston 1976. Abolished April 2009. |
| Elmbridge | 1 April 1974 | None | |
| Epsom and Ewell | 1 April 1974 | Epsom and Ewell (1937) | |
| Erewash | 28 June 1974 | Ilkeston (1887) | Ilkeston had charter trustees April–June 1974 |
| Exeter | 1 April 1974‡ | Exeter (reformed 1835) | |
| Fareham | 1 April 1974 | None | |
| Fylde | 1 April 1974 | Lytham St. Annes (1922) | |
| Gateshead | 1 April 1974 | Gateshead (reformed 1835) | |
| Gedling | 1 April 1974 | None | |
| Gillingham | 1 April 1974 | Gillingham (1903) | Abolished 1996 |
| Glanford | 1 April 1974 | None | Abolished 1996 |
| Gloucester | 1 April 1974‡ | Gloucester (reformed 1835) | |
| Gosport | 1 April 1974 | Gosport (1922) | |
| Gravesham | 1 April 1974 | Gravesend (reformed 1835) | |
| Great Yarmouth | 1 April 1974 | Great Yarmouth (reformed 1835) | |
| Grimsby | 1 April 1974 | Grimsby (reformed 1835) | Renamed Great Grimsby 1979, abolished 1996. |
| Guildford | 1 April 1974 | Guildford (reformed 1835) | |
| Halton | 1 April 1974 | Widnes (1892) | |
| Harrogate | 1 April 1974 | Harrogate (1884) | Abolished 2023 |
| Hartlepool | 1 April 1974 | Hartlepool formed 1967 from Hartlepool (1850), West Hartlepool (1887) | |
| Hastings | 1 April 1974 | Hastings (reformed 1835) | |
| Havant | 1 April 1974 | None | |
| Hereford | 1 April 1974‡ | Hereford (reformed 1835) | Abolished 1998 |
| Hertsmere | 15 April 1977 | None | |
| High Peak | 1 April 1974 | Glossop (1866), Buxton (1917) | |
| Hinckley and Bosworth | 1 April 1974 | None | |
| Holderness | 21 June 1977 | Hedon (1861) (formed a town council in 1974) | Abolished 1996 |
| Hove | 1 April 1974 | Hove (1898) | Abolished 1997 |
| Hyndburn | 1 April 1974 | Accrington (1878) | |
| Ipswich | 1 April 1974 | Ipswich (reformed 1835) | |
| Kettering | 1 April 1974 | Kettering (1938) | Abolished April 2021 |
| King's Lynn and West Norfolk | See West Norfolk | | |
| Kingston upon Hull | 1 April 1974‡ | Kingston upon Hull (reformed 1835) | |
| Kingswood | 20 May 1987 | None | Abolished 1996 |
| Kirklees | 1 April 1974 | Dewsbury (1862), Huddersfield (1868), Batley (1868), Spenborough (1955) | |
| Knowsley | 1 April 1974 | None | |
| Lancaster | 1 April 1974‡ | Lancaster (reformed 1835) | |
| Langbaurgh | 1 April 1974 | Formed from part of Teesside county borough, created in 1967, and including Redcar (incorporated in 1921) | Renamed Langbaurgh on Tees 1988 Renamed Redcar and Cleveland 1996 |
| Leeds | 1 April 1974‡ | Leeds (reformed 1835), Pudsey (1889) | |
| Leicester | 1 April 1974‡ | Leicester (reformed 1835) | |
| Lincoln | 1 April 1974‡ | Lincoln (reformed 1835) | |
| Liverpool | 1 April 1974‡ | Liverpool (reformed 1835) | |
| Luton | 1 April 1974 | Luton (1876) | |
| Macclesfield | 1 April 1974 | Macclesfield (reformed 1835) | Abolished April 2009 |
| Maidstone | 1 April 1974 | Maidstone (reformed 1835) | |
| Manchester | 1 April 1974‡ | Manchester (1838) | |
| Medina | 1 April 1974 | Newport (reformed 1835), Ryde (1868) | Abolished 1995 |
| Medway (1) | 1 April 1974 | Rochester (reformed 1835), Chatham (1890) | Renamed Rochester-upon-Medway 1979, and awarded city status. Abolished 1998 |
| Medway (2) | 1998 | From Rochester upon Medway, Gillingham boroughs (q.v.) | |
| Melton | 1 April 1974 | None | |
| Middlesbrough | 1 April 1974 | Formed from part of Teesside county borough, created in 1967, and including Middlesbrough (incorporated in 1853) | |
| Milton Keynes | 1 April 1974 | None | Granted city status in 2022 |
| Newcastle-under-Lyme | 1 April 1974 | Newcastle-under-Lyme (reformed 1835) | |
| Newcastle upon Tyne | 1 April 1974‡ | Newcastle upon Tyne (reformed 1835) | |
| Northampton | 1 April 1974 | Northampton (reformed 1835) | Abolished April 2021. Mayoralty continued by Northampton Town Council |
| North Bedfordshire | 16 October 1975 | Bedford (reformed 1835) | Renamed Bedford 1992 |
| North East Lincolnshire | 23 August 1996 | From Cleethorpes, Great Grimsby boroughs (q.v.) | Both former boroughs formed charter trustees |
| North Lincolnshire | 16 December 1996 | Formed from Boothferry, Glanford, and Scunthorpe boroughs (q.v.) | Scunthorpe's mayoralty is continued by charter trustees |
| North Tyneside | 1 April 1974 | Tynemouth (1849), Wallsend (1901) | |
| North Warwickshire | 1 April 1974 | None | |
| North Wolds | 1 April 1974 | Bridlington (1899) | Renamed East Yorkshire 1981. Abolished 1996 |
| Norwich | 1 April 1974‡ | Norwich (reformed 1835) | |
| Nottingham | 1 April 1974‡ | Nottingham (reformed 1835) | |
| Nuneaton | 1 April 1974 | Nuneaton (1907) | Renamed Nuneaton and Bedworth 1980 |
| Oadby and Wigston | 1 April 1974 | None | |
| Oldham | 1 April 1974 | Oldham (1849) | |
| Oswestry | 1 April 1974 | Oswestry Rural Borough (reformed 1835) | Abolished in April 2009. |
| Oxford | 1 April 1974‡ | Oxford (reformed 1835) | |
| Pendle | 15 September 1976 | Nelson (1890), Colne (1895) | |
| Peterborough | 1 April 1974‡ | Peterborough (1874) | |
| Plymouth | 1 April 1974‡ | Plymouth (reformed 1835) | |
| Poole | 1 April 1974 | Poole (reformed 1835) | Abolished April 2019 |
| Portsmouth | 1 April 1974‡ | Portsmouth (reformed 1835) | |
| Preston | 1 April 1974 (granted city status in 2002) | Preston (reformed 1835) | |
| Reading | 1 April 1974 | Reading (reformed 1835) | |
| Redcar and Cleveland | See Langbaurgh | | |
| Redditch | 15 May 1980 | None | |
| Reigate and Banstead | 1 April 1974 | Reigate (reformed (1863) | |
| Restormel | 1 April 1974 | St. Austell with Fowey (formed 1968, including Fowey 1913) | Abolished in April 2009. |
| Ribble Valley | 1 April 1974 | Clitheroe (reformed 1835) | |
| Rochdale | 1 April 1974 | Rochdale (1856), Heywood (1881), Middleton (1886) | |
| Rochester upon Medway | See Medway (1) | | |
| Rossendale | 1 April 1974 | Bacup (1882), Haslingden (1891), Rawtenstall (1891) | |
| Rotherham | 1 April 1974 | Rotherham, (1871) | |
| Rugby | 1 April 1974 | Rugby (1932) | |
| Runnymede | 20 January 1978 | None | |
| Rushcliffe | 1 April 1974 | None | |
| Rushmoor | 1 April 1974 | Aldershot (1922) | |
| St Albans | 1 April 1974‡ | St Albans (reformed 1835) | |
| St Edmundsbury | 1 April 1974 | Bury St Edmunds (reformed 1835) | Abolished April 2019 |
| St Helens | 1 April 1974 | St Helens (1868) | |
| Salford | 1 April 1974‡ | Salford (1844), Eccles (1892), Swinton and Pendlebury (1934) | |
| Sandwell | 1 April 1974 | West Bromwich (1882), including since 1966 the former boroughs of Tipton (1938) and Wednesbury (1886); Warley (1966), including the former boroughs of Smethwick (1899), Rowley Regis (1933), and Oldbury (1935) | |
| Scarborough | 1 April 1974 | Scarborough (reformed 1835) | Abolished 2023 |
| Scunthorpe | 1 April 1974 | Scunthorpe (1936) | Abolished 1996 |
| Sedgefield | 17 October 1996 | None | Abolished April 2009. Mayoralty continued by Sedgefield Town Council |
| Sefton | 17 April 1975 | Southport (1866), Bootle (1868), Crosby (1937) | All three towns formed charter trustees 1974–1975 |
| Sheffield | 1 April 1974‡ | Sheffield (1843) | |
| Shrewsbury and Atcham | 1 April 1974 | Shrewsbury (reformed 1835) | Abolished in April 2009. |
| Slough | 1 April 1974 | Slough (1938) | |
| Solihull | 1 April 1974 | Solihull (1954) | |
| Southampton | 1 April 1974‡ | Southampton (reformed 1835) | |
| Southend-on-Sea | 1 April 1974 | Southend-on-Sea (1892) | Granted city status in 2022 |
| South Ribble | 1 April 1974 | None | |
| South Tyneside | 1 April 1974 | South Shields (1850), Jarrow (1875) | |
| South Wight | 1974? | None | Abolished 1995 |
| Spelthorne | 1 April 1974 | None | |
| Stafford | 1 April 1974 | Stafford (reformed 1835) | |
| Stevenage | 1 April 1974 | None | |
| Stockport | 1 April 1974 | Stockport (reformed 1835) | |
| Stockton-on-Tees | 1 April 1974 | Formed from part of Teesside county borough, created in 1967, and including Stockton-on-Tees (reformed 1835) and Thornaby-on-Tees (incorporated in 1892) | |
| Stoke-on-Trent | 1 April 1974‡ | Stoke-on-Trent formed 1910, including boroughs of Hanley (incorporated in 1857), Longton (1865), Burslem (1878), Stoke-upon-Trent (1874). | |
| Sunderland | 1 April 1974 (granted city status in 1992) | Sunderland (reformed 1835) | |
| Surrey Heath | 1 April 1974 | None | |
| Swale | 20 January 1978 | Faversham (reformed 1835), Queenborough-in-Sheppey (created 1968, including borough of Queenborough, reformed in 1885) | Queenborough-in-Sheppey formed charter trustees 1974–1977 |
| Swindon | See Thamesdown | | |
| Tameside | 1 April 1974 | Ashton-under-Lyne (1847), Stalybridge (1857), Hyde (1881), Mossley (1885), Dukinfield (1899) | |
| Tamworth | 1 April 1974 | Tamworth (reformed 1835) | |
| Taunton Deane | 1975 | Taunton (1877) | Taunton had charter trustees 1974–1975, Abolished April 2019 |
| Telford and Wrekin | 2002 | None | |
| Test Valley | 22 October 1976 | Andover, Romsey, both reformed 1835 | Andover had charter trustees 1974–1976. Romsey formed a town council. |
| Tewkesbury | 1 April 1974 | Tewkesbury (reformed 1835) | |
| Thamesdown | 1 April 1974 | Swindon (1900) | Renamed Swindon 1997 |
| Thurrock | 1 April 1974 | None | |
| Tonbridge and Malling | 12 December 1983 | None | |
| Torbay | 1 April 1974 | County borough of Torbay – created 1968, and including the borough of Torquay incorporated in 1892 | |
| Trafford | 1 April 1974 | Stretford (1933), Sale (1935), Altrincham (1937) | |
| Tunbridge Wells | 1 April 1974 | Royal Tunbridge Wells (1888) | Charter trustees for Royal Tunbridge Wells existed from 1 April to 20 December 1974 |
| Vale Royal | 5 May 1988 | None | Abolished April 2009 |
| Wakefield | 1 April 1974‡ | Pontefract (reformed 1835), Wakefield (1848), Ossett (1890), Castleford (1955) | |
| Walsall | 1 April 1974 | Walsall (reformed 1835) | |
| Warrington | 1 April 1974 | Warrington (1847) | |
| Watford | 1 April 1974 | Watford (1922) | |
| Waverley | 21 February 1984 | Godalming (reformed 1835) | Godalming formed a town council in 1974 |
| Wellingborough | 1 April 1974 | None | Abolished April 2021 |
| Welwyn Hatfield | 3 April 2006 | None | |
| West Devon | 27 April 1982 | Okehampton (reformed 1885) | Okehampton formed a town council in 1974 |
| West Norfolk | 30 June 1981 | King's Lynn (reformed 1835) | Renamed King's Lynn and West Norfolk 14 May 1981 |
| West Lancashire | 1 April 2009 | None | |
| Weymouth and Portland | 1 April 1974 | Weymouth and Melcombe Regis (reformed 1835) | Abolished April 2019 |
| Wigan | 1 April 1974 | Wigan (reformed 1835), Leigh (1899) | Leigh Abolished 1972 |
| Winchester | 1 April 1974‡ | Winchester (reformed 1835) | |
| Windsor and Maidenhead | 1 April 1974 (Royal Borough) | Windsor, Maidenhead, both reformed 1835 | |
| Wirral | 1 April 1974 | Birkenhead (1877), Wallasey (1910), Bebington (1937) | |
| Woking | 1 April 1974 | none | |
| Wokingham | 1 March 2007 | Wokingham (reformed 1883) | Wokingham formed a town council in 1974 |
| Wolverhampton | 1 April 1974. Granted city status 2000 | Wolverhampton (1848). Had absorbed the borough of Bilston in 1967 (incorporated in 1938). | |
| Worcester | 1 April 1974‡ | Worcester (reformed 1835) | |
| Worthing | 1 April 1974 | Worthing, 1890 | |
| Wyre | 1 April 1974 | Fleetwood (1933) | |
| York (1) | 1 April 1974‡ | York (reformed 1835) | The District was abolished and replaced with a larger unitary authority in 1996 |
| York (2) | 1 April 1996‡ | Created in 1996. Inherited traditions from the smaller York district. | |

Greater London is divided into thirty-two London boroughs. Their borough status dates from 1965, although each of them had previously included municipal, county or metropolitan boroughs:

| London borough | Previous boroughs | Notes |
|---|---|---|
| Barking | Barking (1931), Dagenham (1938) | Renamed Barking and Dagenham 1981 |
| Barnet | Hendon (1932), Finchley (1933) | |
| Bexley | Bexley (1937), Erith (1938) | |
| Brent | Willesden (1933), Wembley (1937) | |
| Bromley | Bromley (1903), Beckenham (1935) | |
| Camden | Hampstead, Holborn, St Pancras all created 1900 | |
| Croydon | Croydon (1883) | |
| Ealing | Ealing (1901), Acton (1921), Southall (1936) | |
| Enfield | Southgate (1933), Edmonton (1937), Enfield (1955) | |
| Greenwich (Royal Borough) | Greenwich, Woolwich both created 1900 | |
| Hackney | Hackney, Shoreditch, Stoke Newington all created 1900 | |
| Hammersmith | Hammersmith, Fulham both created 1900 | Renamed Hammersmith and Fulham 1981 |
| Haringey | Hornsey (1903), Wood Green (1933), Tottenham (1934) | |
| Harrow | Harrow (1954) | |
| Havering | Romford (1937) | |
| Hillingdon | Uxbridge (1955) | |
| Hounslow | Brentford and Chiswick, Heston and Isleworth both incorporated in 1932 | |
| Islington | Islington, Finsbury both created 1900 | |
| Kensington and Chelsea (Royal Borough) | Kensington, Chelsea both created 1900 | |
| Kingston upon Thames (Royal Borough) | Kingston upon Thames (reformed 1835), Malden and Coombe (1936), Surbiton (1936) | |
| Lambeth | Lambeth created 1900 | |
| Lewisham | Lewisham, Deptford both created 1900 | |
| Merton | Wimbledon (1905), Mitcham (1934) | |
| Newham | West Ham (1886), East Ham (1904) | |
| Redbridge | Ilford (1926), Wanstead and Woodford (1937) | |
| Richmond upon Thames | Richmond (1890), Twickenham (1926), Barnes (1932) | |
| Southwark | Bermondsey, Camberwell, Southwark all created 1900 | |
| Sutton | Sutton and Cheam (1934), Beddington and Wallington (1937) | |
| Tower Hamlets | Bethnal Green, Poplar, Stepney all created 1900 | |
| Waltham Forest | Leyton (1926), Walthamstow (1929), Chingford (1938) | |
| Wandsworth | Battersea, Wandsworth both created 1900 | |
| Westminster‡ | Paddington, St Marylebone, Westminster all created 1900 | |

==== Wales ====
Borough charters granted under section 245 of the Local Government Act 1972 to Welsh districts
| District | Year of charter | Previous boroughs | Notes |
|---|---|---|---|
| Aberconwy | 1974 | Conway (1885) | |
| Afan | 1974 | Port Talbot (formed 1921, including borough of Aberavon, reformed 1861) | Renamed Port Talbot 1986 |
| Arfon | 1974 | Caernarvon (reformed 1835), Bangor (reformed 1883) | Bangor and Caernarfon formed town councils |
| Blaenau Gwent | 1974 | None | |
| Brecknock | 1974 | Brecon (reformed 1835) | Brecon formed a town council |
| Cardiff | 1974 (and city status) | Cardiff (reformed 1835) | |
| Colwyn | 1974 | Colwyn Bay (1934) | |
| Cynon Valley | 1974 | None | |
| Delyn | 1974 | Flint (reformed 1835) | Flint formed a town council |
| Dinefwr | 1974 | Llandovery (reformed 1835) | Llandovery formed a town council |
| Islwyn | 1974 | None | |
| Llanelli | 1974 | Kidwelly (reformed 1885), Llanelli (1913) | Kidwelly and Llanelli formed town councils |
| Lliw Valley | 1974 | None | |
| Merthyr Tydfil | 1974 | Merthyr Tydfil (1905) | |
| Monmouth | 1988 | Monmouth (reformed 1835), Abergavenny (1899) | Abergavenny and Monmouth formed town councils |
| Neath | 1974 | Neath (reformed 1835) | Neath formed a town council |
| Newport | 1974 (granted city status in 2002) | Newport (reformed 1835) | |
| Ogwr | 1974 | None | |
| Port Talbot | See Afan | | |
| Rhondda | 1974 | Rhondda (1955) | |
| Rhuddlan | 1974 | None | |
| Swansea | 1974 (and city status) | Swansea (reformed 1835) | |
| Taff-Ely | 1974 | None | |
| Torfaen | 1974 | None | |
| Vale of Glamorgan | 1974 | Cowbridge (1887), Barry (1938) | Cowbridge and Barry formed town councils |
| Wrexham Maelor | 1974 | Wrexham (1857) | |
| Ynys Môn – Isle of Anglesey | 1974 | Beaumaris (reformed 1835) | Beaumaris formed a town council |

The districts created in 1974 were abolished in 1996 by the Local Government (Wales) Act 1994. The 1994 Act amended section 245 of the Local Government Act 1972, allowing the new unitary county councils established by the Act to apply for a charter in a similar manner to the old district councils. On receiving a charter a county became a "county borough".

Welsh unitary authorities granted a charter in 1996 bestowing county borough status
| County borough | Previous boroughs | Notes |
|---|---|---|
| Aberconwy and Colwyn | Aberconwy, Colwyn | Renamed Conwy 1996 |
| Blaenau Gwent | Blaenau Gwent | |
| Bridgend | Ogwr | |
| Caerphilly | Islwyn | |
| Cardiff | Cardiff has the status of a "city and county" by letters patent | |
| Conwy | See Aberconwy and Colwyn | |
| Merthyr Tydfil | Merthyr Tydfil | |
| Neath and Port Talbot | Neath, Port Talbot | Renamed Neath Port Talbot 1996 |
| Newport | Newport | Became "city and county" in 2002 |
| Rhondda Cynon Taff | Cynon Valley, Rhondda, Taff-Ely | |
| Swansea | Swansea has the status of a "city and county" by letters patent | |
| Torfaen | Torfaen | |
| Vale of Glamorgan | Vale of Glamorgan | |
| Wrexham | Wrexham Maelor | |

=== Northern Ireland ===
The privileges of borough status are that the council chairperson is called "mayor"; up to one quarter of councillors can be called "alderman"; and the council can award freedom of the borough. The Municipal Corporations (Ireland) Act 1840 extinguished all the boroughs in Ireland except for ten. In what would in 1921 become Northern Ireland, there were two remaining municipal boroughs in 1840: Belfast (made a city in 1888) and Derry (officially Londonderry, and a city since 1604). Five towns with abolished corporations remained parliamentary boroughs until 1885 (Armagh, Carrickfergus, Coleraine, Dungannon, and Enniskillen) as did three (Downpatrick, Lisburn, and Newry) where any corporation was defunct by 1801. Several of the urban districts in Northern Ireland created under the Local Government (Ireland) Act 1898 later received charters granting borough status. The Local Government Act (Northern Ireland) 1972 replaced the multi-tier local government system with 26 unitary districts whose councils could retain the charter of a borough within the district; other districts later received borough charters in their own right. The 2015 local government reforms replaced the 26 districts with 11 larger districts. The "statutory transition committee" handling each council merger had the right to request transfer of borough status as in 1972, and unionist-majority councils did so, while nationalist-majority councils chose not to apply. There were complications where places had city status; therefore Belfast, Derry and Lisburn's borough charters carried over automatically, without the need for the council to pass a resolution. Although Newry received city status in 2002, Newry and Mourne District Council did not receive borough status. In 2015 its successor Newry, Mourne and Down District Council voted not to request borough status, the required two-thirds majority failing after opposition from Sinn Féin.

Northern Ireland boroughs since 1840
| 2015 borough | 1972–2015 borough | Pre-1972 borough | Year of charter | Notes |
|---|---|---|---|---|
| Antrim and Newtownabbey | Antrim | | 1977 | Antrim town's borough status was extinguished in 1840. It was Antrim's borough charter which the merged council opted to preserve in 2015. |
| Antrim and Newtownabbey | Newtownabbey | | 1977 | |
| Armagh, Banbridge and Craigavon | Armagh | | 1997 | Armagh town already had city status granted by letters patent in 1994. Its previous borough status was extinguished in 1840. It was Armagh's borough charter which the merged council opted to preserve in 2015. |
| Armagh, Banbridge and Craigavon | Craigavon | Portadown, Lurgan | 1947, 1949 | |
| Belfast | Belfast | Belfast | 1613 | Charter reformed 1840. City status by letters patent of 1888. |
| Causeway Coast and Glens | Ballymoney | | 1977 | |
| Causeway Coast and Glens | Coleraine | Coleraine | 1928 | Coleraine's previous borough status was extinguished in 1840. It was Coleraine's borough charter which the merged council opted to preserve in 2015. |
| Causeway Coast and Glens | Limavady | | 1989 | |
| Derry and Strabane | Derry | Londonderry | 1604 | Charter reformed 1840. District and borough renamed Derry 1984; name of city remains Londonderry (see Derry/Londonderry name dispute). |
| Lisburn and Castlereagh | Castlereagh | | 1977 | The new district council is called Lisburn and Castlereagh City Council. |
| Lisburn and Castlereagh | Lisburn | Lisburn | 1964 | Lisburn was granted city status by letters patent in 2002. |
| Mid and East Antrim | Ballymena | Ballymena | 1937 | |
| Mid and East Antrim | Carrickfergus | Carrickfergus | 1939 | Carrickfergus's previous borough status was extinguished in 1840. It was Carrickfergus's borough charter which the merged council opted to preserve in 2015. |
| Mid and East Antrim | Larne | Larne | 1938 | |
| Ards and North Down | Ards | Newtownards | 1937 | Newtownards' previous borough status was extinguished in 1840. The "North Down and Ards" statutory transition committee voted in 2014 to apply for borough status for the merged district council under the name "East Coast Borough Council", but negative public reaction prompted a rethink, and the name "Ards and North Down" was not finalised until 2016. The charter transfer was delayed until after this. |
| Ards and North Down | North Down | Bangor | 1927 | Bangor's previous borough status was extinguished in 1840. It was North Down's borough charter which the merged council opted to preserve in 2016. |
| | Dungannon and South Tyrone | | 1999 | Borough status was simultaneous with 1999 renaming the district from "Dungannon". Dungannon town's borough status was extinguished in 1840. Now in Mid-Ulster District. |
| | | Enniskillen | 1949 | Previous borough status was extinguished in 1840. In 1967, Enniskillen Borough Council lost its administrative functions to Fermanagh County Council, but retained its ceremonial role. The post-1972 Fermanagh District Council did not inherit Enniskillen's borough status. Since 2015 in Fermanagh and Omagh District. |

== See also ==
- City status in the United Kingdom
