= Aberbargoed =

Town in Wales

Coordinates: 51.6968°N 3.2240°W

Aberbargoed: Welsh: Aberbargod
- Location within Caerphilly
- Population: 3,882
- OS grid reference: SO155005
- Principal area: Caerphilly
- Preserved county: Gwent
- Country: Wales
- Sovereign state: United Kingdom
- Post town: BARGOED
- Postcode district: CF81
- Dialling code: 01443
- Police: Gwent
- Fire: South Wales
- Ambulance: Welsh
- UK Parliament: Blaenau Gwent and Rhymney
- Senedd Cymru – Welsh Parliament: Islwyn

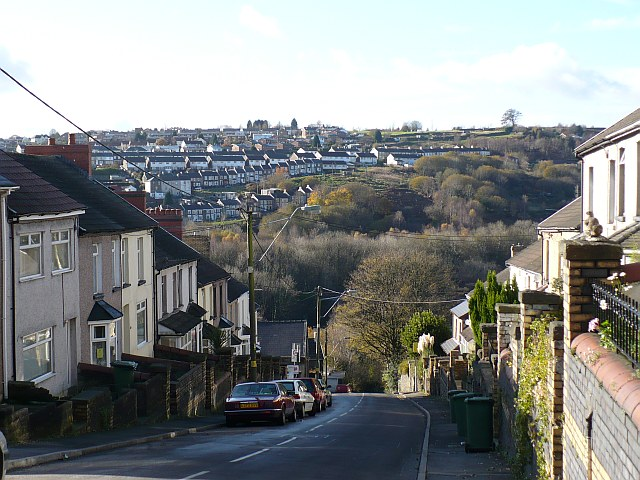
Bedwellty Road, Aberbargoed

Aberbargoed (Welsh: Aberbargod) is a town in the County Borough of Caerphilly, Wales. Aberbargoed once contained the largest ever colliery waste tip in Europe, although this has now been reclaimed and turned into a country park. The town is within the historic boundaries of Monmouthshire.

== Toponymy ==
Aber refers to a "confluence" or "mouth" of a river and bargod is a "border".

== Mining ==
Coal mining operations in Bargoed Colliery started in 1897 when the Powell Duffryn Steam Coal Company started to sink the shaft. In 1901, the "Ras Las" nine-foot seam was discovered at a depth of 625 yards. The north and south shafts were completed. In November 1903, Sir Alfred Thomas, MP for East Glamorgan, started the engines to raise the first four trams of coal. By 1910, the pit was employing 1,943 miners and was the largest coal mine in the Rhymney Valley. On 10 December 1908, it broke the world record for production when a ten-hour shift produced 3,562 tons of coal. It further broke its own record on 23 April 1909 when 4,020 tons were raised in a ten-hour shift. Bargoed Colliery closed on 4 June 1977. By this time, only 360 men were employed there.

== Population ==
The population of Pont Aberbargoed was 351 in the census of 1851. Aberbargoed reached a peak in 1961 of 5,157, and had dropped to 3,882 according to the 1991 Census.

== Modern day ==
The coal-mining waste tip that lay between Bargoed and Aberbargoed once towered to a height of 400 feet in the 1970s. The local school had a Plant a tree in '73 campaign in an attempt to make it more pleasurable on the eye. The tip has now been levelled and the area has been reclaimed with walkways. The colliery has gone and is now home to an ambulance station and various small industries. There are also developments with a new retail outlet in the area where the tip once stood.

The large tip at Bedwellty is still there, but has been grassed over and now looks much like the surrounding countryside. Aberbargoed now has an extensive area of grasslands that are protected due to the finding of the rare marsh fritillary butterfly, Euphydryas aurinia in the marshy area north of where Bedwellty School once stood. Recently the A469 Bargoed bypass was constructed through the park.

== Notable people ==
- Sir Harold Josiah Finch, politician
- Geoff Eales, jazz pianist and composer, was born in Aberbargoed
- Luke Evans, actor and singer
- Listed on the War Memorial in the middle of the village is the name of Glyndwr Michael. His body, given the fictional name of "Major William Martin", was used in "Operation Mincemeat", a deception operation by British intelligence agencies during World War II to disguise the 1943 Allied invasion of Sicily.

== Bibliography ==
James, Paul (2002). The History of Bargoed, Gilfach and Aberbargoed in Photographs, Vol. 3. Old Bakehouse Publications. ISBN 1-874538-64-6.
Gelligaer Historical Society (1972). Gelligaer. Gelligaer Historical Society.
