= Bedwellty =

Hamlet in Caerphilly county borough, UK

Bedwellty Bedwellte
- Local Government District (1891–1894); Urban District (1894–1974)
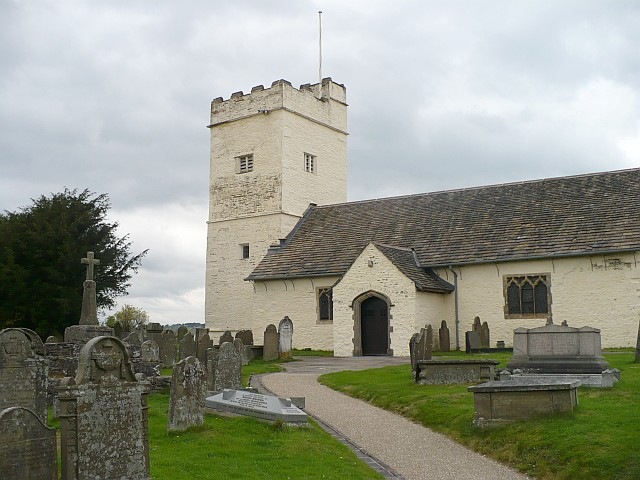
- St Sannan's Church, Bedwellty
- Area
  - 1911: 7,275 acres (29.4 km^{2})
  - 1961: 7,353 acres (29.8 km^{2})
  - Coordinates: 51.6954°N 3.2072°W
- Population
  - 1901: 9,988
  - 1971: 25,338
- History
  - Created: 29 May 1891 (Local Government District); 31 Dec 1894 (Urban District)
  - Abolished: 31 March 1974
  - Succeeded by: Islwyn, Rhymney Valley
  - HQ: Aberbargoed

Bedwellty (Welsh: Bedwellte) is a small village in Caerphilly County Borough in South Wales. It stands on a ridge of high ground between the Rhymney and Sirhowy valleys. The village comprises St Sannan's parish church, public house and a few houses. The register of St Sannan's Church dates from 1624, which qualifies Bedwellty as an ancient parish. The parish lay in the historic county of Monmouthshire, the hundred of Wentloog, Tredegar County Court District, the rural deanery of Bedwellty, the archdeaconry of Monmouth and the diocese of Llandaff. Several towns based on the iron industry expanded within the parish boundary, including from west to east, Rhymney, Tredegar and Ebbw Vale, which gradually gained administrative independence from Bedwellty between the 1870s and 1890s. A Bedwellty Local Government District was established for the rest of the parish in 1891, becoming an urban district in 1894.

Bedwellty Urban District was abolished in 1974, being divided between the Rhymney Valley and Islwyn districts. A community called Bedwellty was then created for the part of the former urban district which lay within Islwyn. The community of Bedwellty was abolished in 1982, being divided into the four communities of Argoed, Blackwood, Cefn Fforest, and Pengam.

== History ==
The original ancient parish was very large, including most of the upper Ebbw and Sirhowy valleys. The first census, of 1801 documented that 619 people lived in the parish, which then included Rhymney and Tredegar. A number of coal mining communities grew up in the parish, and in the 19th century these became separate local government units.

The church of St Sannan was built in a thirteenth century Gothic style. The church tower is fourteenth century and contains six bells. The church was restored in 1858 and repaired in 1882. The exterior is whitewashed.

The Bedwellty Poor Law Union was established in 1849, covering the two parishes of Bedwellty and Aberystruth. A workhouse was built to serve the area at Georgetown in Tredegar, opening in 1852.

On 19 June 1874, Ebbw Vale, Rhymney and Tredegar local boards of health and local government districts were formed, each including parts of the civil parish. The remainder of the parish of Bedwellty became a local government district on 29 May 1891. When parish and district councils were established under the Local Government Act 1894, the Bedwellty Local Government District became Bedwellty Urban District. The 1894 act also directed that parishes could not straddle district boundaries, and so the parts of Bedwellty parish which were within the Ebbw Vale, Rhymney and Tredegar urban districts became separate civil parishes.

Bedwellty urban district included the hamlets and villages of Aberbargoed, Argoed, Blackwood, New Tredegar, and Pengam.

In 1926, Bedwellty and Mynyddislwyn urban districts formed the West Monmouthshire Omnibus Board to ensure local control of bus services. In 1935, a County Review Order altered the boundaries between Bedwellty and Mynyddislwyn.

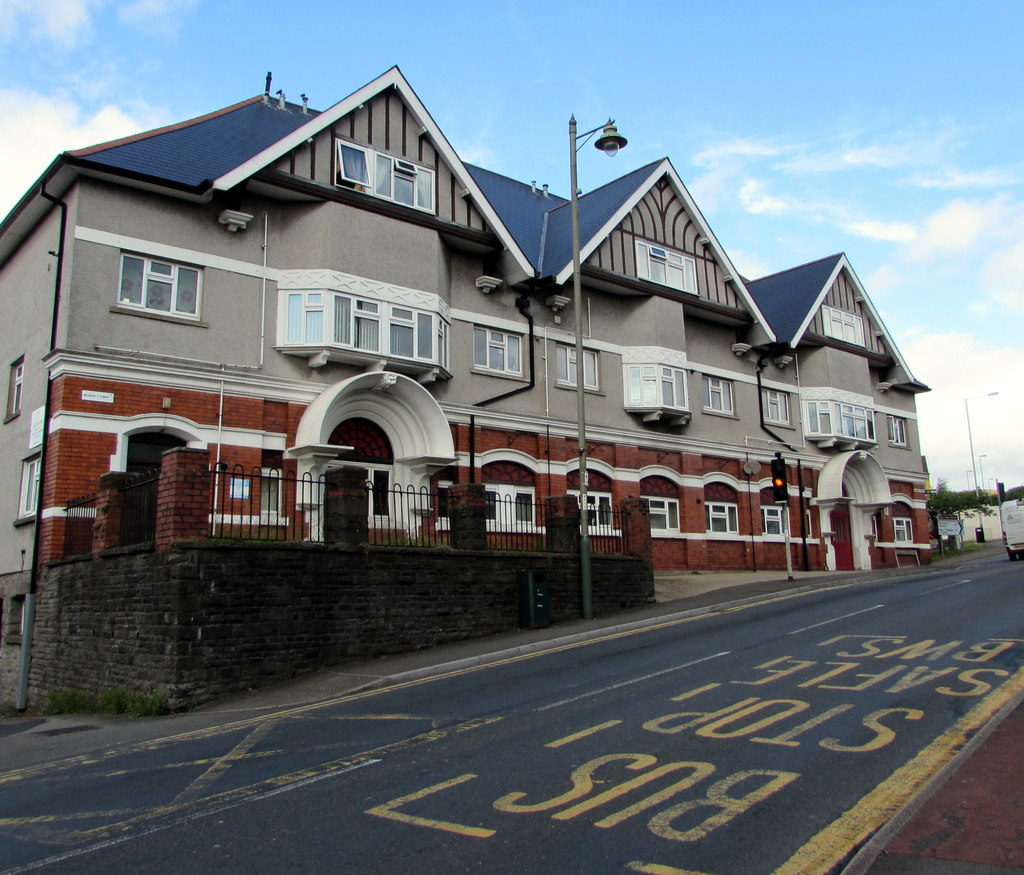
Former Municipal Offices, headquarters of Bedwellty Urban District Council, Commercial Road, Aberbargoed

Bedwellty Urban District Council established its headquarters at the corner of Commercial Road and Bedwellty Road in Aberbargoed. After the council's abolition the building was converted into flats and renamed Blaen-y-Cwm.

The urban district was abolished by the Local Government Act 1972 in 1974. Its area was split: the wards of Aberbargoed, Cwmsyfiog, New Tredegar, and Phillipstown passed to the Rhymney Valley district of Mid Glamorgan, where they became a single community called New Tredegar. The remainder of Bedwellty urban district, comprising the Argoed, Blackwood, Cefn Fforest, and Pengam wards, passed to the Islwyn borough of Gwent, where they became a single community called Bedwellty. The Aberbargoed area was later transferred from New Tredegar community to Bargoed community. Bedwellty community was abolished in 1982, being divided between four new communities called Argoed, Blackwood, Cefn Fforest, and Pengam.

Further local government reorganisation in 1996 saw the Rhymney Valley and Islwyn districts united to become the county borough of Caerphilly, bringing the former area of Bedwellty Urban District back within one administrative area. The area of the former Bedwellty Urban District now corresponds to the communities of Argoed, Blackwood, Cefn Fforest, New Tredegar, Pengam, and parts of the communities of Bargoed and Darran Valley.

The parliamentary constituency of Bedwellty was created in 1918 covering a much larger area. It continued to exist until 1983, when it was replaced by the constituency of Islwyn. The member of parliament for the Bedwellty and Islwyn constituencies from 1970 to 1995 was Neil Kinnock, Leader of the Labour Party from 1983 to 1992, who took the title Baron Kinnock, of Bedwellty in the County of Gwent in 2005.

== See also ==
- Bedwellty (UK Parliament constituency)
- Bedwellty House
- Bedwellty Greyhound Track
