= District of Port Talbot =

Former district of West Glamorgan, Wales

Coordinates: 51.596°N 3.781°W

Port Talbot Afan (1974–1985)
- Borough
- Area
  - 1974: 37,371 acres (151.24 km^{2})
- Population
  - 1973: 55,580
  - 1992: 51,100
- History
  - Created: 1 April 1974
  - Abolished: 31 March 1996
  - Succeeded by: Neath Port Talbot
  - HQ: Port Talbot

Port Talbot was one of the four local government districts of the county of West Glamorgan, Wales from 1974 to 1996. The borough was initially called Afan, changing its name to Port Talbot in 1986.

== History ==
The district was formed as Afan on 1 April 1974 as part of a general reorganisation of local government in England and Wales under the Local Government Act 1972. The new district was named after the River Afan and was granted a charter bestowing the status of a borough.

The Borough of Afan was created by the amalgamation of the areas of the municipal borough of Port Talbot and the urban district of Glyncorrwg, both previously part of the administrative county of Glamorgan.

The legislation did not give the district a name, and the two merging councils were asked to make suggestions. Glyncorrwg favoured 'Afan' while Port Talbot suggested 'Aberafan'. Peter Thomas, the Secretary of State for Wales, decided that Afan was 'better for the whole new district'. Following a resolution passed by the borough council, the borough was renamed as Port Talbot on 1 January 1986.

On 1 April 1996 the two-tier system of councils introduced in Wales in 1974 was replaced, and the country was divided into twenty-two unitary "principal areas" by the Local Government (Wales) Act 1994. Port Talbot was amalgamated with the neighbouring Borough of Neath to form the county borough of Neath Port Talbot.

== Political control ==
The first election to the council was held in 1973, initially operating as a shadow authority alongside the outgoing authorities until it came into its powers on 1 April 1974. Political control of the council from 1974 until the council's abolition in 1996 was as follows:

| Party in control | Years |
|---|---|
| Labour | 1974–1976 |
| Independent | 1976–1979 |
| Labour | 1979–1996 |

== Premises ==
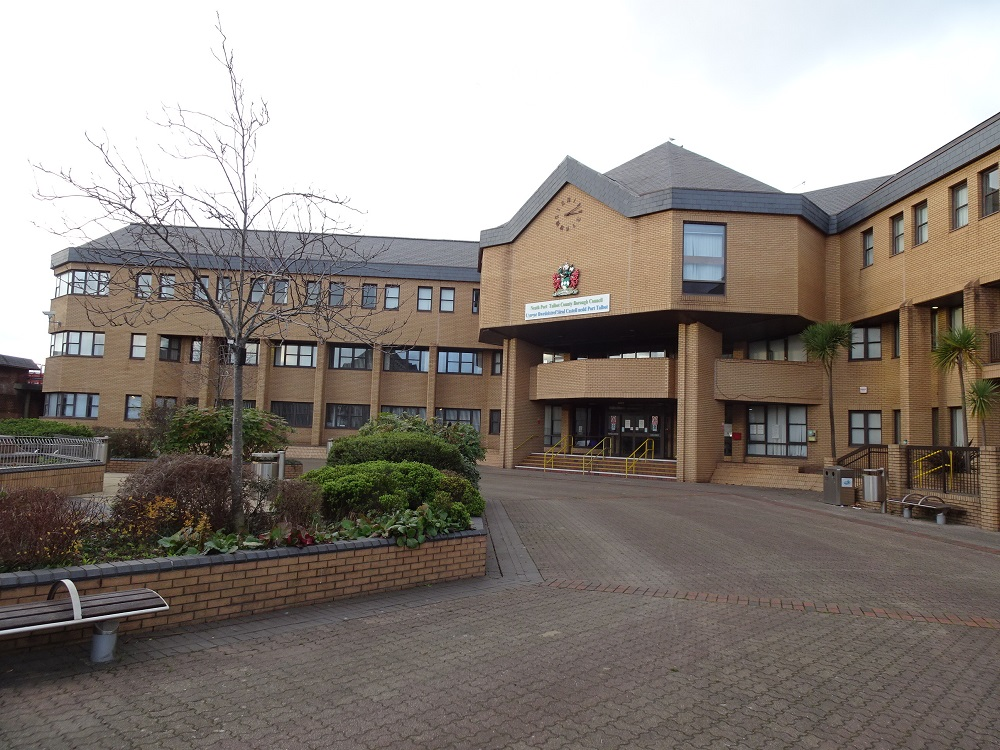
Port Talbot Civic Centre, built 1987

The council was initially based at the former Port Talbot Borough Council's offices at the Municipal Buildings on Bevin Avenue at Aberavon seafront. This was a temporary prefabricated building erected in 1970 when the council vacated the old Aberavon Town Hall and Municipal Buildings (built 1915) on Water Street in Aberavon. The old town hall had then been demolished, along with a large part of the town centre, to make way for the Aberafan shopping centre. In 1987 the council moved to a new purpose-built Civic Centre adjoining the Aberafan shopping centre. The building at Bevin Avenue was later demolished and a cinema built on the site.
