= District of Rhuddlan =

Former district of Clwyd, Wales

Coordinates: 53.291°N 3.465°W

Rhuddlan
- Borough
- History
  - Created: 1 April 1974
  - Abolished: 31 March 1996
  - Succeeded by: Denbighshire
  - HQ: Rhyl
- Contained within
  - County Council: Clwyd

The Borough of Rhuddlan was a local government district with borough status from 1974 to 1996, being one of six districts in the county of Clwyd, north-east Wales.

== History ==
The borough was created on 1 April 1974, under the Local Government Act 1972. It covered the area of three former districts from the administrative county of Flintshire, which were all abolished at the same time:

- Prestatyn Urban District
- Rhyl Urban District
- St Asaph Rural District

The district was named after Rhuddlan Castle, where the Statute of Rhuddlan was issued in 1284. This was illustrated in the borough's coat of arms which showed a castle of the time of Edward I in the shield, and a Welsh dragon grasping a parchment scroll, representing the statute, as the crest. The borough's motto was Rhuddlan Crud Cymru or Rhuddlan, Cradle of Wales.

In 1996 the borough was abolished under the Local Government (Wales) Act 1994, which saw Clwyd County Council and its constituent districts abolished, being replaced by principal areas, whose councils perform the functions which had previously been divided between the county and district councils. Although Rhuddlan had been entirely created from areas that were in Flintshire prior to 1974, the area was placed in the new county of Denbighshire with effect from 1 April 1996.

== Political control ==
The first election to the council was held in 1973, initially operating as a shadow authority alongside the outgoing authorities until it came into its powers on 1 April 1974. Throughout the council's existence a majority of the seats were held by independent councillors.

Party in control	Years
Independent	1974–1996

== Premises ==
The council was initially based at several offices across the district, mostly inherited from its predecessor authorities. In 1991 it consolidated its offices at a new building called Russell House on the corner of Russell Road and Churton Road in Rhyl, built on the site of a house which had previously housed some council departments. Russell House was formally opened by Prince Richard, Duke of Gloucester, on 26 November 1991. After the council's abolition in 1996, Russell House became an area office for the successor Denbighshire County Council.
