= Preserved counties of Wales =

Ceremonial divisions of Wales for lieutenancy and shrievalty purposes

Preserved counties; Siroedd cadwedig (Welsh)
- Preserved counties of Wales since 2010 Administrative counties (1974–1996): 1. Gwent; 2. South Glamorgan; 3. Mid Glamorgan; 4. West Glamorgan; 5. Dyfed; 6. Powys; 7. Gwynedd; 8. Clwyd
- Category: Lieutenancy areas
- Location: Wales
- Created by: Local Government (Wales) Act 1994 (c. 19)
- Created: 1 April 1996
- Number: 8

The preserved counties of Wales (Welsh: siroedd cadwedig) are the eight current areas used in Wales for the ceremonial purposes of lieutenancy and shrievalty. They are based on the counties which were used for local government and other purposes between 1974 and 1996. Each comprises one or more of the 22 single-tier principal areas which are used for administrative purposes.

== Usage ==
The Local Government (Wales) Act 1994 abolished the eight ceremonial counties created by the Local Government Act 1972. However, it created the concept of preserved counties based on their areas, to be used for purposes such as lieutenancy. This usage was consolidated by the Lieutenancies Act 1997. Certain statutes already in force were amended to include reference to them.

== Boundary changes ==
The preserved counties were originally almost identical to the 1974–96 counties, but with a few minor changes in line with local government boundary changes: Llanrhaeadr-ym-Mochnant, Llansilin and Llangedwyn were transferred from Clwyd to Powys, and Wick, St Brides Major, Ewenny and Pentyrch were transferred from Mid Glamorgan to South Glamorgan. There were however two local government areas, Caerphilly and Conwy, split between preserved counties.

The Local Government Boundary Commission for Wales were instructed by the National Assembly for Wales on 11 March 2002 to undertake a review of preserved county boundaries. In their final proposals the part of the local government area of Caerphilly which had been in Mid Glamorgan was to be part of Gwent and the part of the local government area of Conwy which had been in Gwynedd was to be part of Clwyd. The boundary between Mid Glamorgan and South Glamorgan was also to be re-aligned to reflect small changes in local government boundaries. The Assembly accepted these proposals such that from 2 April 2003 each preserved county encompassed between one and five whole local government areas.

The boundary between West Glamorgan and Powys was further modified on 1 April 2005 as a result of boundary changes between Ystalyfera and Ystradgynlais.

The boundary between Mid Glamorgan and Powys was further modified on 1 April 2010 to reflect the 2009 local government boundary changes in the area around Vaynor, Merthyr Tydfil.

== List ==
Preserved counties of Wales
Preserved county	Land area		Population (2024)	Density		Principal areas
Preserved county	(km^{2})	(mi^{2})	Population (2024)	(/km^{2})	(/mi^{2})	Principal areas
Clwyd	2,906	1,122	507,205	175	450	Conwy; Denbighshire; Flintshire; Wrexham
Dyfed	5,774	2,229	389,160	67	170	Carmarthenshire; Ceredigion; Pembrokeshire
Gwent	1,551	599	601,686	388	1,000	Blaenau Gwent; Caerphilly; Monmouthshire; Newport; Torfaen
Gwynedd	3,247	1,254	189,910	58	150	Gwynedd; Isle of Anglesey
Mid Glamorgan	786	303	449,346	571	1,480	Bridgend; Merthyr Tydfil; Rhondda Cynon Taf
Powys	5,181	2,000	135,059	26	67	Powys
South Glamorgan	472	182	519,662	1,101	2,850	Cardiff; Vale of Glamorgan
West Glamorgan	819	316	394,553	482	1,250	Neath Port Talbot; Swansea

== See also ==
- Historic counties of Wales
- Local government in Wales
- Subdivisions of Wales
- Principal areas of Wales
- Ceremonial counties of England
- Shires of Scotland
