= District of Rhymney Valley =

Former district of Mid Glamorgan, Wales

Coordinates: 51.615°N 3.229°W

Rhymney Valley Welsh: Cwm Rhymni
- History
  - Created: 1 April 1974
  - Abolished: 31 March 1996
  - Succeeded by: Caerphilly County Borough
- Status: District
  - HQ: Ystrad Mynach

Rhymney Valley (Welsh: Cwm Rhymni) was one of six local government districts in Mid Glamorgan from 1974 to 1996.

== History ==
The district was formed in 1974 under the Local Government Act 1972. It covered parts of six former districts which were abolished at the same time, and was initially arranged into nine communities based on the former districts:

- Bedwas and Machen, covering Bedwas and Machen Urban District
- Caerphilly, covering Caerphilly Urban District less Taff's Well ward (which went to Taff-Ely)
- Gelligaer, covering Gelligaer Urban District less Bedlinog ward (which went to Merthyr Tydfil)
- Llanfedw‡
- New Tredegar, covering the Aberbargoed, Cwmsyfiog, New Tredegar, and Phillipstown wards from Bedwellty Urban District (the rest of which went to Islwyn)
- Rhydygwern‡
- Rhymney, being the former Rhymney Urban District
- Rudry‡
- Van‡

‡Formerly a parish in Cardiff Rural District

Bedwas and Machen, New Tredegar, and Rhymney had been in the administrative county of Monmouthshire prior to the reforms, whilst the other communities had all been in Glamorgan. The Rhymney River was the historic boundary between the two counties. Mid Glamorgan County Council provided county-level services to the district.

The communities within the district were reorganised in 1985, which saw the small communities of Llanfedw and Rhydygwern abolished (both being absorbed into Rudry), and the creation of new communities of Aber Valley, Bargoed, Darran Valley, Llanbradach, Maesycwmmer, Nelson, and Penyrheol.

In 1996 the district was abolished, merging with neighbouring Islwyn to become the new unitary Caerphilly County Borough.

== Political control ==
The first election to the council was held in 1973, initially operating as a shadow authority before coming into its powers on 1 April 1974. Political control of the council from 1974 until its abolition in 1996 wasas follows:

Party in control	Years
Labour	1974–1976
No overall control	1976–1979
Labour	1979–1996

== Bus operations ==
The district council inherited the municipal bus fleets of Bedwas and Machen, Caerphilly and Gelligaer urban district councils. The united operation was given a dark brown, cream and gold livery, and ran operations throughout the valley and into Merthyr Tydfil and Newport.

With bus deregulation in 1986 the buses passed to Inter Valley Link Limited, owned by the district council at "arms length". Competition was very strong in the South Wales Valleys, and Inter Valley Link was sold to National Welsh Omnibus Services on 21 March 1989. National Welsh subsequently went into receivership in 1991.

== Premises ==
The council inherited various offices from its predecessor authorities. It consolidated its premises in 1983 at Ystrad Fawr House at Ystrad Mynach, a Victorian house which had previously served as offices for the National Coal Board. Ystrad Fawr continued to be used by the successor Caerphilly County Borough Council until 2008 when it was demolished to make way for the Ysbyty Ystrad Fawr hospital.
