= District of Rhondda =

Former district of Mid Glamorgan, Wales

Coordinates: 51°38′N 3°28′W

Rhondda Welsh: Y Rhondda Ystradyfodwg (1877–1897)
- Local Government District (1877-1894); Urban District (1894-1955); Municipal Borough (1955-1974); Borough (1974-1996)
- Rhondda district (1974-1996) shown within Wales
- History
  - Created: 1877 (as Ystradyfodwg)
  - Abolished: 31 March 1996
  - Succeeded by: Rhondda Cynon Taf
- Government
  - HQ: Pentre
  - Motto: Hwy Clod na Golud (Fame outlasts wealth)

Rhondda (Welsh: Y Rhondda) was a local government district in the geographical area of the Rhondda Valley, south Wales, from 1877 until 1996, with various statuses through its history.

== History ==
The district was initially created in 1877 as the Ystradyfodwg Local Government District covering most of the parish of Ystradyfodwg, but excluding the Rhigos area north of the hills. A local board was formed to govern the area. The district was enlarged in 1879 to take in parts of Llanwonno and Llantrisant parishes, bringing the Porth area into the district.

The Local Government Act 1894 reconstituted the area as Ystradyfodwg Urban District, with an elected urban district council replacing the local board. At the same time the parish boundaries were adjusted so that the civil parish of Ystradyfodwg matched the urban district. It was renamed Rhondda Urban District in 1897 after the River Rhondda. In 1955 Rhondda received a charter of incorporation to become the Municipal Borough of Rhondda.

The Local Government Act 1972 completely reorganised local government in Wales in 1974. The Borough of Rhondda, with an identical area to the municipal borough, was one of six local government districts of the new county of Mid Glamorgan from 1974 to 1996.

The borough was abolished in 1996, with its area passing to the unitary Rhondda Cynon Taf county borough.

== Political control ==
The first election to the council following the Local Government Act 1972 was held in 1973, initially operating as a shadow authority before coming into its revised powers on 1 April 1974. From 1974 until the council's abolition in 1996, the Labour Party always held a majority of the seats on the council.

Party in control	Years
Labour	1974–1996

== Premises ==
The local board built itself a headquarters on Llewellyn Street in Pentre, with the building being formally opened on 2 May 1884. The building continued to serve as the headquarters for the subsequent urban district and borough councils until the abolition of the Rhondda Borough Council in 1996. The new Rhondda Cynon Taf County Borough Council moved its headquarters to Clydach Vale, using the old building at Pentre as secondary offices for some years before selling it.

== Coat of arms ==
On incorporation in 1955, the borough was granted a coat of arms. the blazon was as follows:

Vert a pall wavy argent on a chief indented sable a balance between two acorns leaved and slipped Or, and for a Crest out of a mural crown Sable a demi-dragon gules gorged with a riband pendant therefrom an escutcheon Or charged with three chevrons of the second and supporting a torch erect of the first enflamed proper. Supporters: On either side a sea-dragon sable the tail proper gorged with a collar checky argent and azure.

In 1974 the arms were transferred to the Rhondda Borough Council.

The shield was an heraldic map of the borough, with the white wavy "pall" depicting the confluence of the Rhondda Fach and Rhondda Fawr rivers. The indented edge of the "chief" or upper third of the shield represented the mountainous nature of the valley. The chief was coloured black symbolising coal-mining. On this were placed symbols in gold: acorns for the growth of new industries and a balance for balanced development. The crest featured a mural or walled crown symbolic of local government. From this rose the red dragon of Wales. The dragon supported a flaming torch for coal and allied industries. around the dragon's neck hung a shield bearing three chevrons, from the arms of the de Clares, Lords of Glamorgan. These formed the basis of the arms of both Glamorgan and Mid Glamorgan County Councils. The supporters were black sea-dragons, for Welsh sea-coal. Around their necks were silver and blue chequered collars. These were derived from the arms of the Marquess of Bute. The third Marquess was responsible for the initial exploitation of the coal reserves of the valley.
