= Islwyn =

Former district of Gwent, Wales

Coordinates: 51.64°N 3.15°W

- History
  - Created: 1 April 1974
  - Abolished: 31 March 1996
  - Succeeded by: Caerphilly County Borough
- Status: Borough
  - HQ: Pontllanfraith

The Borough of Islwyn was one of five local government districts of Gwent from 1974 to 1996.

== History ==
The borough was formed in 1974 as a local government district of Gwent. It covered the whole area of three former districts and part of a fourth, which were all abolished at the same time:

- Abercarn Urban District
- Bedwellty Urban District - the Argoed, Blackwood, Cefn Fforest, and Pengam wards only (rest became New Tredegar community in Rhymney Valley)
- Mynyddislwyn Urban District
- Risca Urban District

All the constituent parts of Islwyn had previously been in the administrative county of Monmouthshire prior to the reforms. Gwent County Council provided county-level services to the new borough.

The district was named after local poet William Thomas (1832–1878), who used the bardic name 'Islwyn'. Islwyn (meaning "below the grove") was part of the name of the ancient parish of Mynyddislwyn which covered its area. This was shown in the borough's coat of arms which represented a mountain below a grove of oak trees.

The borough was abolished in 1996, when its area became part of Caerphilly County Borough.

Islwyn continued as a Westminster constituency until the 2024 general election, and will continue as a Senedd constituency until the 2026 Senedd election. The Westminster constituency's best-known MP was Neil Kinnock.

== Political control ==
The first election to the council was held in 1973, initially operating as a shadow authority before coming into its powers on 1 April 1974. Political control of the council from 1974 until its abolition in 1996 was as follows:

Party in control	Years
Labour	1974–1976
No overall control	1976–1979
Labour	1979–1996

== Premises ==
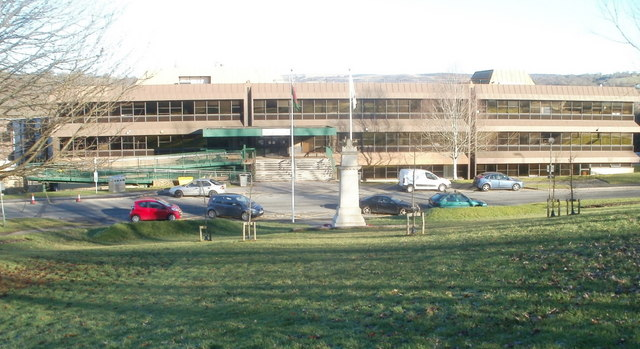
Pontllanfraith House: Council's headquarters, built 1977

The council built itself a new headquarters in 1977 at Pontllanfraith House on Blackwood Road in Pontllanfraith. The building subsequently served as offices for Caerphilly County Borough Council until 2015 and has since been demolished.
