= Taff-Ely =

Former district of Mid Glamorgan, Wales

Coordinates: 51.570°N 3.342°W

Taff-Ely Welsh: Taf-Elái
- Taff-Ely shown within Wales
- History
  - Created: 1 April 1974
  - Abolished: 31 March 1996
  - Succeeded by: Rhondda Cynon Taf
- Status: District
  - HQ: Pontypridd

Taff-Ely (Welsh: Taf-Elái) was a local government district with borough status in Wales from 1974 to 1996.

== History ==
The borough was formed in 1974 as a local government district of Mid Glamorgan. It covered parts of five former districts which were abolished at the same time, and was initially arranged into ten communities based on the former districts and parishes:

- Llanharan‡
- Llanharry‡
- Llanilid‡
- Llanilterne, formerly a parish in Cardiff Rural District
- Llantrisant, formerly a parish in Llantrisant and Llantwit Fardre Rural District
- Llantwit Fardre, formerly a parish in Llantrisant and Llantwit Fardre Rural District
- Pentyrch, formerly a parish in Cardiff Rural District
- Peterson-super-Montem‡
- Pontypridd, covering Pontypridd Urban District
- Taff's Well, covering the Taff's Well ward from Caerphilly Urban District

‡Formerly a parish in Cowbridge Rural District

The borough was named after the River Taff and the River Ely.

The communities within the borough were reorganised in 1985, which saw the small community of Llanilterne (where the main settlement was Capel Llanilltern) absorbed into Pentyrch, the communities of Llanilid and Peterson-super-Montem absorbed into Llanharan, and the large community of Llantrisant divided into the four communities of Gilfach Goch, Tonyrefail, Pont-y-clun, and a smaller Llantrisant community.

In 1996 the borough was abolished, with most of the area going to the new principal area of Rhondda Cynon Taf, with the exception of Pentyrch community going to Cardiff.

== Political control ==
The first election to the council was held in 1973, initially operating as a shadow authority before coming into its powers on 1 April 1974. Political control of the council from 1974 until its abolition in 1996 was as follows:

| Party in control | Years |
|---|---|
| Labour | 1974–1976 |
| No overall control | 1976–1979 |
| Labour | 1979–1991 |
| No overall control | 1991–1996 |

== Premises ==
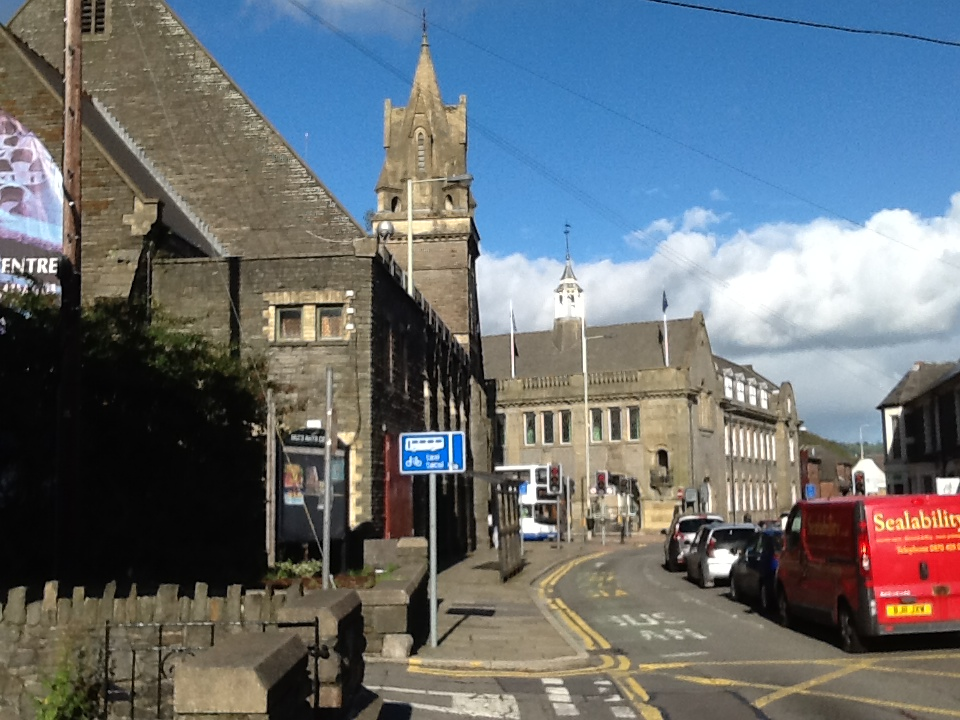
Pontypridd Municipal Buildings

The council was based at the Municipal Buildings on Gelliwastad Road in Pontypridd, which had been built in 1904 as the headquarters of Pontypridd Urban District Council. Since the council's abolition in 1996 the building has been used as a register office for Rhondda Cynon Taf County Borough Council.
