= Civil parishes in Lancashire =

Lowest unit of English local governance

A map of Lancashire, showing the Boroughs : (1) West Lancashire; (2) Chorley; (3) South Ribble; (4) Fylde; (5) Preston; (6) Wyre; (7) Lancaster; (8) Ribble Valley; (9) Pendle; (10) Burnley; (11) Rossendale; (12) Hyndburn; (13) Blackpool; and (14) Blackburn with Darwen.

A civil parish is a subnational entity, forming the lowest unit of local government in England. There are 219 civil parishes in the ceremonial county of Lancashire; Blackpool is completely unparished; Pendle and Ribble Valley are entirely parished. At the 2001 census, there were 587,074 people living in the 219 parishes, accounting for 41.5 per cent of the county's population.

== History ==
Parishes arose from Church of England divisions, and were originally purely ecclesiastical divisions. Over time they acquired civil administration powers.

The Highways Act 1555 made parishes responsible for the upkeep of roads. Every adult inhabitant of the parish was obliged to work four days a year on the roads, providing their own tools, carts and horses; the work was overseen by an unpaid local appointee, the Surveyor of Highways.

The poor were looked after by the monasteries, until their dissolution. In 1572, magistrates were given power to 'survey the poor' and impose taxes for their relief. This system was made more formal by the Poor Law Act 1601, which made parishes responsible for administering the Poor Law; overseers were appointed to charge a rate to support the poor of the parish. The 19th century saw an increase in the responsibility of parishes, although the Poor Law powers were transferred to Poor Law Unions. The Public Health Act 1872 grouped parishes into Rural Sanitary Districts, based on the Poor Law Unions; these subsequently formed the basis for Rural Districts.

Parishes were run by vestries, meeting annually to appoint officials, and were generally identical to ecclesiastical parishes, although some townships in large parishes administered the Poor Law themselves; under the Divided Parishes and Poor Law Amendment Act 1882, all extra-parochial areas and townships that levied a separate rate became independent civil parishes.

Civil parishes in their modern sense date from the Local Government Act 1894, which abolished vestries; established elected parish councils in all rural parishes with more than 300 electors; grouped rural parishes into Rural Districts; and aligned parish boundaries with county and borough boundaries. Urban civil parishes continued to exist, and were generally coterminous with the Urban District, Municipal Borough or County Borough in which they were situated; many large towns contained a number of parishes, and these were usually merged into one. Parish councils were not formed in urban areas, and the only function of the parish was to elect guardians to Poor Law Unions; with the abolition of the Poor Law system in 1930 the parishes had only a nominal existence.

The Local Government Act 1972 retained civil parishes in rural areas, and many former Urban Districts and Municipal Boroughs that were being abolished, were replaced by new successor parishes; urban areas that were considered too large to be single parishes became unparished areas.

== The current position ==
Recent governments have encouraged the formation of town and parish councils in unparished areas, and the Local Government and Rating Act 1997 gave local residents the right to demand the creation of a new civil parish.

A parish council can become a town council unilaterally, simply by resolution; and a civil parish can also gain city status, but only if that is granted by the Crown. The chairman of a town or city council is called a mayor. The Local Government and Public Involvement in Health Act 2007 introduced alternative names: a parish council can now choose to be called a community; village; or neighbourhood council.

— — — — — Civil parishes in Lancashire (in 2010) — — — — — Town parishes (in 2010) — Unparished area (in 2010)

== List of civil parishes and unparished areas ==
Image	Name	Status	Population	District	Former local authority	Refs	Map ref
	Blackburn	Unparished area	97,058	Blackburn with Darwen	Blackburn; County Borough		A98
	Darwen	Town	27,495	Blackburn with Darwen	Darwen; Municipal Borough		A1
	Eccleshill	Civil parish	276	Blackburn with Darwen	Blackburn; Rural District		A2
	Hoddlesden	Unparished area	1,292	Blackburn with Darwen	Darwen; Municipal Borough		A99
	Livesey	Civil parish	6,337	Blackburn with Darwen	Blackburn; Rural District		A3
	North Turton	Civil parish	3,736	Blackburn with Darwen	Turton; Urban District		A4
	Pleasington	Civil parish	467	Blackburn with Darwen	Blackburn; Rural District		A5
	Tockholes	Civil parish	454	Blackburn with Darwen	Blackburn; Rural District		A6
	Yate and Pickup Bank	Civil parish	355	Blackburn with Darwen	Blackburn; Rural District		A7
	Blackpool	Unparished area	142,283	Blackpool	Blackpool; County Borough		B99
	Briercliffe	Civil parish	3,187	Burnley	Burnley; Rural District		C1
	Burnley	Unparished area	64,925	Burnley	Burnley; County Borough		C99
	Cliviger	Civil parish	2,350	Burnley	Burnley; Rural District		C2
	Dunnockshaw	Civil parish	212	Burnley	Burnley; Rural District		C3
	Habergham Eaves	Civil parish	1,581	Burnley	Burnley; Rural District		C4
	Hapton	Civil parish	3,769	Burnley	Burnley; Rural District		C5
	Ightenhill	Civil parish	1,512	Burnley	Burnley; Rural District		C6
	Padiham	Town	8,998	Burnley	Padiham; Urban District		C7
	Worsthorne-with-Hurstwood	Civil parish	2,986	Burnley	Burnley; Rural District		C8
	Adlington	Town	5,270	Chorley	Adlington; Urban District		D1
	Anderton	Civil parish	1,206	Chorley	Chorley; Rural District		D2
	Anglezarke	Civil parish	23	Chorley	Chorley; Rural District		D3
	Astley Village	Civil parish	3,329	Chorley	Chorley; Municipal Borough		D4
	Bretherton	Civil parish	655	Chorley	Chorley; Rural District		D5
	Brindle	Civil parish	999	Chorley	Chorley; Rural District		D6
	Charnock Richard	Civil parish	1,885	Chorley	Chorley; Rural District		D7
	Chorley	Unparished area	31,556	Chorley	Chorley; Municipal Borough		D99
	Clayton-le-Woods	Civil parish	14,528	Chorley	Chorley; Rural District		D8
	Coppull	Civil parish	7,637	Chorley	Chorley; Rural District		D9
	Croston	Civil parish	2,679	Chorley	Chorley; Rural District		D10
	Cuerden	Civil parish	77	Chorley	Chorley; Rural District		D11
	Eccleston	Civil parish	4,353	Chorley	Chorley; Rural District		D12
	Euxton	Civil parish	8,318	Chorley	Chorley; Rural District		D13
	Heapey	Civil parish	955	Chorley	Chorley; Rural District		D14
	Heath Charnock	Civil parish	2,065	Chorley	Chorley; Rural District		D15
	Heskin	Civil parish	883	Chorley	Chorley; Rural District		D16
	Hoghton	Civil parish	867	Chorley	Chorley; Rural District		D17
	Mawdesley	Civil parish	1,787	Chorley	Chorley; Rural District		D18
	Rivington	Civil parish	144	Chorley	Chorley; Rural District		D19
	Ulnes Walton	Civil parish	2,048	Chorley	Chorley; Rural District		D20
	Wheelton	Civil parish	1,001	Chorley	Chorley; Rural District		D21
	Whittle-le-Woods	Civil parish	4,553	Chorley	Chorley; Rural District		D22
	Withnell	Civil parish	3,631	Chorley	Withnell; Urban District		D23
	Ansdell	Civil parish		Fylde	Lytham St Annes; Municipal Borough		
	Bryning-with-Warton	Civil parish	3,572	Fylde	Fylde; Rural District		E1
	Elswick	Civil parish	1,057	Fylde	Fylde; Rural District		E2
	Freckleton	Civil parish	6,045	Fylde	Fylde; Rural District		E3
	Greenhalgh-with-Thistleton	Civil parish	462	Fylde	Fylde; Rural District		E4
	Kirkham	Town	7,127	Fylde	Kirkham; Urban District		E5
	Little Eccleston-with-Larbreck	Civil parish	374	Fylde	Fylde; Rural District		E6
	Lytham	Town		Fylde	Lytham St Annes; Municipal Borough		E99
	Medlar-with-Wesham	Town	3,245	Fylde	Fylde; Rural District		E7
	Newton-with-Clifton	Civil parish	2,680	Fylde	Fylde; Rural District		E8
	Ribby-with-Wrea	Civil parish	1,489	Fylde	Fylde; Rural District		E9
	Saint Anne's on the Sea	Town	25,743	Fylde	Lytham St Annes; Municipal Borough		E10
	Singleton	Civil parish	877	Fylde	Fylde; Rural District		E11
	Staining	Civil parish	2,312	Fylde	Fylde; Rural District		E12
	Treales, Roseacre and Wharles	Civil parish	447	Fylde	Fylde; Rural District		E13
	Weeton-with-Preese	Civil parish	1,096	Fylde	Fylde; Rural District		E14
	Westby-with-Plumptons	Civil parish	1,107	Fylde	Fylde; Rural District		E15
	Accrington	Unparished area	34,128	Hyndburn	Accrington; Municipal Borough		F99
	Altham	Civil parish	897	Hyndburn	Burnley; Rural District		F1
	Church	Unparished area	3,988	Hyndburn	Church; Urban District		F99
	Clayton le Moors	Unparished area	8,289	Hyndburn	Clayton le Moors; Urban District		F99
	Great Harwood	Unparished area	11,217	Hyndburn	Great Harwood; Urban District		F99
	Oswaldtwistle	Unparished area	15,627	Hyndburn	Oswaldtwistle; Urban District		F99
	Rishton	Unparished area	7,350	Hyndburn	Rishton; Urban District		F99
	Aldcliffe-with-Stodday	Civil parish	189	Lancaster	Lancaster; Municipal Borough		G99
	Arkholme-with-Cawood	Civil parish	334	Lancaster	Lunesdale; Rural District		G1
	Bolton-le-Sands	Civil parish	4,098	Lancaster	Lancaster; Rural District		G2
	Borwick	Civil parish	210	Lancaster	Lunesdale; Rural District		G3
	Burrow-with-Burrow	Civil parish	191	Lancaster	Lunesdale; Rural District		G4
	Cantsfield	Civil parish	76	Lancaster	Lunesdale; Rural District		G5
	Carnforth	Town	5,350	Lancaster	Carnforth; Urban District		G6
	Caton-with-Littledale	Civil parish	2,720	Lancaster	Lunesdale; Rural District		G7
	Claughton	Civil parish	132	Lancaster	Lunesdale; Rural District		G8
	Cockerham	Civil parish	558	Lancaster	Lancaster; Rural District		G9
	Ellel	Civil parish	2,521	Lancaster	Lancaster; Rural District		G10
	Gressingham	Civil parish	153	Lancaster	Lunesdale; Rural District		G11
	Halton-with-Aughton	Civil parish	2,360	Lancaster	Lunesdale; Rural District		G12
	Heaton-with-Oxcliffe	Civil parish	2,225	Lancaster	Lancaster; Rural District		G13
	Heysham	Unparished area	11,016	Lancaster	Morecambe and Heysham; Municipal Borough		G98
	Hornby-with-Farleton	Civil parish	729	Lancaster	Lunesdale; Rural District		G14
	Ireby	Civil parish	78	Lancaster	Lunesdale; Rural District		G15
	Lancaster	Unparished area	50,867 (including Aldcliffe-with-Stodday)	Lancaster	Lancaster; Municipal Borough		G99
	Leck	Civil parish	189	Lancaster	Lunesdale; Rural District		G16
	Melling-with-Wrayton	Civil parish	290	Lancaster	Lunesdale; Rural District		G17
	Middleton	Civil parish	521	Lancaster	Lancaster; Rural District		G18
	Morecambe	Town	35,916	Lancaster	Morecambe and Heysham; Municipal Borough		G19
	Nether Kellet	Civil parish	646	Lancaster	Lunesdale; Rural District		G20
	Over Kellet	Civil parish	778	Lancaster	Lunesdale; Rural District		G21
	Over Wyresdale	Civil parish	348	Lancaster	Lancaster; Rural District		G22
	Overton	Civil parish	1,015	Lancaster	Lancaster; Rural District		G23
	Priest Hutton	Civil parish	177	Lancaster	Lancaster; Rural District		G24
	Quernmore	Civil parish	532	Lancaster	Lunesdale; Rural District		G25
	Roeburndale	Civil parish	76	Lancaster	Lunesdale; Rural District		G26
	Scotforth	Civil parish	239	Lancaster	Lancaster; Rural District		G27
	Silverdale	Civil parish	1,545	Lancaster	Lancaster; Rural District		G28
	Slyne-with-Hest	Civil parish	3,163	Lancaster	Lancaster; Rural District		G29
	Tatham	Civil parish	393	Lancaster	Lunesdale; Rural District		G30
	Thurnham	Civil parish	595	Lancaster	Lancaster; Rural District		G31
	Tunstall	Civil parish	105	Lancaster	Lunesdale; Rural District		G32
	Warton	Civil parish	2,315	Lancaster	Lancaster; Rural District		G33
	Wennington	Civil parish	102	Lancaster	Lunesdale; Rural District		G34
	Whittington	Civil parish	359	Lancaster	Lunesdale; Rural District		G35
	Wray-with-Botton	Civil parish	521	Lancaster	Lunesdale; Rural District		G36
	The Yealands	Civil parish	471	Lancaster	Lancaster; Rural District		G37 and G38
	Barley-with-Wheatley Booth	Civil parish	271	Pendle	Burnley; Rural District		H1
	Barnoldswick	Town	10,859	Pendle	Barnoldswick; Urban District		H2
	Barrowford	Civil parish	6,039	Pendle	Barrowford; Urban District		H3
	Blacko	Civil parish	595	Pendle	Burnley; Rural District		H4
	Brierfield	Town	8,199	Pendle	Brierfield; Urban District		H6
	Colne	Town	18,117	Pendle	Colne; Municipal Borough		H7
	Earby	Civil parish	4,348	Pendle	Earby; Urban District		H18
	Foulridge	Civil parish	1,506	Pendle	Burnley; Rural District		H9
	Goldshaw Booth	Civil parish	265	Pendle	Burnley; Rural District		H10
	Higham-with-West Close Booth	Civil parish	808	Pendle	Burnley; Rural District		H11
	Kelbrook and Sough	Civil parish	1,026	Pendle	Earby; Urban District		H12
	Laneshaw Bridge	Civil parish	759	Pendle	Colne; Municipal Borough		H13
	Nelson	Town	29,108	Pendle	Nelson; Municipal Borough		H14
	Old Laund Booth	Civil parish	1,586	Pendle	Burnley; Rural District		H15
	Reedley Hallows	Civil parish	1,994	Pendle	Burnley; Rural District		H16
	Roughlee Booth	Civil parish	328	Pendle	Burnley; Rural District		H17
	Salterforth	Civil parish	625	Pendle	Skipton; Rural District		H8
	Trawden Forest	Civil parish	2,580	Pendle	Trawden; Urban District		H19
	Barton	Civil parish	1,096	Preston	Preston; Rural District		I1
	Broughton	Civil parish	1,735	Preston	Preston; Rural District		I2
	Fulwood	Unparished area	33,171	Preston	Fulwood; Urban District		I99
	Goosnargh	Civil parish	1,204	Preston	Preston; Rural District		I3
	Grimsargh	Civil parish	2,164	Preston	Preston; Rural District		I4
	Haighton	Civil parish	197	Preston	Preston; Rural District		I5
	Ingol and Tanterton	Civil parish		Preston			I99
	Lea	Civil parish	5,962	Preston	Preston; Rural District		I6
	Preston	Unparished area	79,864 (including Ingol and Tanterton)	Preston	Preston; County Borough		I99
	Whittingham	Civil parish	2,189	Preston	Preston; Rural District		I7
	Woodplumpton	Civil parish	2,051	Preston	Preston; Rural District		I8
	Aighton, Bailey and Chaigley	Civil parish	1,249	Ribble Valley	Clitheroe; Rural District		J1
	Balderstone	Civil parish	379	Ribble Valley	Blackburn; Rural District		J2
	Barrow	Civil parish		Ribble Valley	Clitheroe; Rural District		J48
	Bashall Eaves	Civil parish	162	Ribble Valley	Bowland; Rural District		J3
	Billington and Langho	Civil parish	4,555	Ribble Valley	Blackburn; Rural District		J4
	Bolton-by-Bowland	Civil parish	498	Ribble Valley	Bowland; Rural District		J5
	Bowland Forest High	Civil parish	163	Ribble Valley	Bowland; Rural District		J6
	Bowland Forest Low	Civil parish	168	Ribble Valley	Bowland; Rural District		J7
	Bowland-with-Leagram	Civil parish	128	Ribble Valley	Clitheroe; Rural District		J8
	Chatburn	Civil parish	1,104	Ribble Valley	Clitheroe; Rural District		J9
	Chipping	Civil parish	1,046	Ribble Valley	Clitheroe; Rural District		J10
	Clayton-le-Dale	Civil parish	1,142	Ribble Valley	Blackburn; Rural District		J11
	Clitheroe	Town	14,697	Ribble Valley	Clitheroe; Municipal Borough		J12
	Dinckley	Civil parish	83	Ribble Valley	Blackburn; Rural District		J13
	Downham	Civil parish	156	Ribble Valley	Clitheroe; Rural District		J14
	Dutton	Civil parish	212	Ribble Valley	Preston; Rural District		J15
	Easington	Civil parish	52	Ribble Valley	Bowland; Rural District		J16
	Gisburn	Civil parish	506	Ribble Valley	Bowland; Rural District		J17
	Gisburn Forest	Civil parish	137	Ribble Valley	Bowland; Rural District		J18
	Great Mitton	Civil parish	205	Ribble Valley	Bowland; Rural District		J19
	Grindleton	Civil parish	723	Ribble Valley	Bowland; Rural District		J20
	Horton	Civil parish	76	Ribble Valley	Bowland; Rural District		J21
	Hothersall	Civil parish	136	Ribble Valley	Preston; Rural District		J22
	Little Mitton	Civil parish	42	Ribble Valley	Clitheroe; Rural District		J23
	Longridge	Town	7,546	Ribble Valley	Longridge; Urban District		J24
	Mearley	Civil parish	25	Ribble Valley	Clitheroe; Rural District		J25
	Mellor	Civil parish	2,126	Ribble Valley	Blackburn; Rural District		J26
	Middop	Civil parish	43	Ribble Valley	Bowland; Rural District		J27
	Newsholme	Civil parish	50	Ribble Valley	Bowland; Rural District		J28
	Newton	Civil parish	237	Ribble Valley	Bowland; Rural District		J29
	Osbaldeston	Civil parish	165	Ribble Valley	Blackburn; Rural District		J30
	Paythorne	Civil parish	95	Ribble Valley	Bowland; Rural District		J31
	Pendleton	Civil parish	203	Ribble Valley	Clitheroe; Rural District		J32
	Ramsgreave	Civil parish	770	Ribble Valley	Blackburn; Rural District		J33
	Read	Civil parish	1,383	Ribble Valley	Burnley; Rural District		J34
	Ribchester	Civil parish	1,535	Ribble Valley	Preston; Rural District		J35
	Rimington	Civil parish	382	Ribble Valley	Bowland; Rural District		J36
	Sabden	Civil parish	1,371	Ribble Valley	Burnley; Rural District		J37
	Salesbury	Civil parish	391	Ribble Valley	Blackburn; Rural District		J38
	Sawley	Civil parish	305	Ribble Valley	Bowland; Rural District		J39
	Simonstone	Civil parish	1,152	Ribble Valley	Burnley; Rural District		J40
	Slaidburn	Civil parish	288	Ribble Valley	Bowland; Rural District		J41
	Thornley-with-Wheatley	Civil parish	327	Ribble Valley	Clitheroe; Rural District		J42
	Twiston	Civil parish	64	Ribble Valley	Clitheroe; Rural District		J43
	Waddington	Civil parish	878	Ribble Valley	Bowland; Rural District		J44
	West Bradford	Civil parish	730	Ribble Valley	Bowland; Rural District		J45
	Whalley	Civil parish	2,645	Ribble Valley	Clitheroe; Rural District		J46
	Wilpshire	Civil parish	2,569	Ribble Valley	Blackburn; Rural District		J47
	Wiswell	Civil parish	985 (including Barrow)	Ribble Valley	Clitheroe; Rural District		J48
	Worston	Civil parish	76	Ribble Valley	Clitheroe; Rural District		J49
	Bacup	Unparished area	14,191	Rossendale	Bacup; Municipal Borough		K99
	Edenfield	Unparished area	3,544	Rossendale	Ramsbottom; Urban District		K99
	Haslingden	Unparished area	16,849	Rossendale	Haslingden; Municipal Borough		K99
	Rawtenstall	Unparished area	23,805	Rossendale	Rawtenstall; Municipal Borough		K99
	Whitworth	Town	7,263	Rossendale	Whitworth; Urban District		K1
	Cuerdale	Civil parish	36	South Ribble	Preston; Rural District		L1
	Farington	Civil parish	6,088	South Ribble	Preston; Rural District		L2
	Hutton	Civil parish	2,073	South Ribble	Preston; Rural District		L3
	Leyland	Unparished area	30,165	South Ribble	Leyland; Urban District		L99
	Little Hoole	Civil parish	1,815	South Ribble	Preston; Rural District		L4
	Longton	Civil parish	7,732	South Ribble	Preston; Rural District		L5
	Much Hoole	Civil parish	1,851	South Ribble	Preston; Rural District		L6
	Penwortham	Town	23,436	South Ribble	Preston; Rural District		L7
	Samlesbury	Civil parish	1,011	South Ribble	Preston; Rural District		L8
	Walton le Dale	Unparished area	29,660	South Ribble	Walton le Dale; Urban District		L99
	Aughton	Civil parish	8,342	West Lancashire	West Lancashire; Rural District		M1
	Bickerstaffe	Civil parish	1,196	West Lancashire	West Lancashire; Rural District		M2
	Bispham	Civil parish	207	West Lancashire	West Lancashire; Rural District		M3
	Burscough	Civil parish	8,968	West Lancashire	Ormskirk; Urban District		M4
	Dalton	Civil parish	348	West Lancashire	Wigan; Rural District		M5
	Downholland	Civil parish	966	West Lancashire	West Lancashire; Rural District		M6
	Great Altcar	Civil parish	243	West Lancashire	West Lancashire; Rural District		M7
	Halsall	Civil parish	1,873	West Lancashire	West Lancashire; Rural District		M8
	Hesketh-with-Becconsall	Civil parish	3,873	West Lancashire	West Lancashire; Rural District		M9
	Hilldale	Civil parish	633	West Lancashire	Wigan; Rural District		M10
	Lathom	Civil parish	890	West Lancashire	Ormskirk; Urban District		M11
	Lathom South	Civil parish	762	West Lancashire	Ormskirk; Urban District		M12
	Newburgh	Civil parish	1,080	West Lancashire	Ormskirk; Urban District		M13
	North Meols	Civil parish	3,792	West Lancashire	West Lancashire; Rural District		M14
	Ormskirk	Unparished area	17,234	West Lancashire	Ormskirk; Urban District		M98
	Parbold	Civil parish	2,702	West Lancashire	Wigan; Rural District		M15
	Rufford	Civil parish	2,048	West Lancashire	West Lancashire; Rural District		M16
	Scarisbrick	Civil parish	3,204	West Lancashire	West Lancashire; Rural District		M17
	Simonswood	Civil parish	130	West Lancashire	West Lancashire; Rural District		M18
	Skelmersdale	Unparished area	34,550	West Lancashire	Skelmersdale and Holland; Urban District		M99
	Tarleton	Civil parish	5,350	West Lancashire	West Lancashire; Rural District		M19
	Up Holland	Civil parish	7,180	West Lancashire	Skelmersdale and Holland; Urban District		M20
	Wrightington	Civil parish	2,807	West Lancashire	Wigan; Rural District		M21
	Barnacre-with-Bonds	Civil parish	1,751	Wyre	Garstang; Rural District		N1
	Bleasdale	Civil parish	147	Wyre	Garstang; Rural District		N2
	Cabus	Civil parish	1,572	Wyre	Garstang; Rural District		N3
	Catterall	Civil parish	1,981	Wyre	Garstang; Rural District		N4
	Claughton	Civil parish	562	Wyre	Garstang; Rural District		N5
	Fleetwood	Town	26,841	Wyre	Fleetwood; Municipal Borough		N6
	Forton	Civil parish	1,253	Wyre	Garstang; Rural District		N7
	Garstang	Town	4,074	Wyre	Garstang; Rural District		N8
	Great Eccleston	Civil parish	1,473	Wyre	Garstang; Rural District		N9
	Hambleton	Civil parish	2,678	Wyre	Garstang; Rural District		N10
	Inskip-with-Sowerby	Civil parish	878	Wyre	Garstang; Rural District		N11
	Kirkland	Civil parish	343	Wyre	Garstang; Rural District		N12
	Myerscough and Bilsborrow	Civil parish	1,521	Wyre	Garstang; Rural District		N13
	Nateby	Civil parish	475	Wyre	Garstang; Rural District		N14
	Nether Wyresdale	Civil parish	613	Wyre	Garstang; Rural District		N15
	Out Rawcliffe	Civil parish	567	Wyre	Garstang; Rural District		N16
	Pilling	Civil parish	1,739	Wyre	Garstang; Rural District		N17
	Poulton-le-Fylde	Unparished area	18,264	Wyre	Poulton-le-Fylde; Urban District		N99
	Preesall	Town	5,314	Wyre	Preesall; Urban District		N18
	Stalmine-with-Staynall	Civil parish	1,476	Wyre	Garstang; Rural District		N19
	Thornton–Cleveleys	Unparished Area	31,157	Wyre	Thornton–Cleveleys; Urban District		N99
	Upper Rawcliffe-with-Tarnacre	Civil parish	604	Wyre	Garstang; Rural District		N20
	Winmarleigh	Civil parish	335	Wyre	Garstang; Rural District		N21

== See also ==
- List of civil parishes in England
