= List of rural and urban districts in England in 1973 =

This is a list of all the rural districts, urban districts and municipal boroughs in England as they existed prior to the entry into force of the Local Government Act 1972 on 1 April 1974. There were 1086 such districts and boroughs at this time, the result of a gradual consolidation since their formation in 1894. Apart from these, England also had 79 county boroughs.

== Bedford ==
District	Successor
Ampthill Rural District	Mid Bedfordshire
Ampthill Urban District	Mid Bedfordshire
Bedford Borough	Bedford
Bedford Rural District	Bedford
Biggleswade Rural District	Mid Bedfordshire
Biggleswade Urban District	Mid Bedfordshire
Dunstable Borough	South Bedfordshire
Kempston Urban District	Bedford
Leighton-Linslade Urban District	South Bedfordshire
Luton Rural District	South Bedfordshire
Sandy Urban District	Mid Bedfordshire

Luton was a county borough.

== Berkshire ==
District	Successor
Abingdon Borough	Vale of White Horse (Oxfordshire)
Abingdon Rural District	Vale of White Horse
Bradfield Rural District	Newbury
Cookham Rural District	Windsor and Maidenhead
Easthampstead Rural District	Bracknell
Faringdon Rural District	Vale of White Horse
Hungerford Rural District	Newbury
Maidenhead Borough	Windsor and Maidenhead
New Windsor Borough	Windsor and Maidenhead
Newbury Borough	Newbury
Newbury Rural District	Newbury
Wallingford Borough	South Oxfordshire (Oxfordshire)
Wallingford Rural District	South Oxfordshire
Wantage Rural District	Vale of White Horse, Newbury
Wantage Urban District	Vale of White Horse
Windsor Rural District	Windsor and Maidenhead
Wokingham Borough	Wokingham
Wokingham Rural District	Wokingham

Reading was a county borough.

== Buckingham ==
District	Successor
Amersham Rural District	Chiltern
Aylesbury Borough	Aylesbury Vale
Aylesbury Rural District	Aylesbury Vale
Beaconsfield Urban District	Beaconsfield
Bletchley Urban District	Milton Keynes
Buckingham Borough	Aylesbury Vale
Buckingham Rural District	Aylesbury Vale
Chesham Urban District	Chiltern
Eton Rural District	Beaconsfield, Slough (Berkshire), Windsor and Maidenhead (Berkshire)
Eton Urban District	Windsor and Maidenhead
High Wycombe Borough	Wycombe
Marlow Urban District	Wycombe
Newport Pagnell Rural District	Milton Keynes
Newport Pagnell Urban District	Milton Keynes
Slough Borough	Slough
Wing Rural District	Aylesbury Vale
Winslow Rural District	Aylesbury Vale, Milton Keynes
Wolverton Urban District	Milton Keynes
Wycombe Rural District	Wycombe

There were no county boroughs.

== Cambridgeshire and Isle of Ely ==
District	Successor
Cambridge Borough	Cambridge
Chatteris Urban District	Fenland
Chesterton Rural District	South Cambridgeshire
Ely Rural District	East Cambridgeshire
Ely Urban District	East Cambridgeshire
March Urban District	Fenland
Newmarket Rural District	East Cambridgeshire
North Witchford Rural District	Fenland
South Cambridgeshire Rural District	South Cambridgeshire
Whittlesey Urban District	Fenland
Wisbech Borough	Fenland
Wisbech Rural District	Fenland

There were no county boroughs.

== Cheshire ==
District	Successor
Alderley Edge Urban District	Macclesfield
Alsager Urban District	Congleton
Altrincham Borough	Trafford (Greater Manchester)
Bebington Borough	Wirral (Merseyside)
Bollington Urban District	Macclesfield
Bowdon Urban District	Trafford
Bredbury and Romiley Urban District	Stockport (Greater Manchester)
Bucklow Rural District	Trafford, Manchester (Greater Manchester), Macclesfield
Cheadle and Gatley Urban District	Stockport
Chester Rural District	Chester
Congleton Borough	Congleton
Congleton Rural District	Congleton
Crewe Borough	Crewe and Nantwich
Disley Rural District	Macclesfield
Dukinfield Borough	Tameside (Greater Manchester)
Ellesmere Port Borough	Ellesmere Port and Neston
Hale Urban District	Trafford
Hazel Grove and Bramhall Urban District	Stockport
Hoylake Urban District	Wirral
Hyde Borough	Tameside
Knutsford Urban District	Macclesfield
Longdendale Urban District	Tameside
Lymm Urban District	Warrington
Macclesfield Borough	Macclesfield
Macclesfield Rural District	Macclesfield
Marple Urban District	Stockport
Middlewich Urban District	Congleton
Nantwich Rural District	Crewe and Nantwich
Nantwich Urban District	Crewe and Nantwich
Neston Urban District	Ellesmere Port and Neston
Northwich Rural District	Vale Royal
Northwich Urban District	Vale Royal
Runcorn Rural District	Vale Royal, Warrington, Halton
Runcorn Urban District	Halton
Sale Borough	Trafford
Sandbach Urban District	Congleton
Stalybridge Borough	Tameside
Tarvin Rural District	Chester
Tintwistle Rural District	High Peak (Derbyshire)
Wilmslow Urban District	Macclesfield
Winsford Urban District	Vale Royal
Wirral Urban District	Wirral

Birkenhead, Chester, Stockport, and Wallasey were county boroughs.

== Cornwall ==
District	Successor
Bodmin Borough	North Cornwall
Bude-Stratton Urban District	North Cornwall
Camborne-Redruth Urban District	Kerrier
Camelford Rural District	North Cornwall
Falmouth Borough	Carrick
Helston Borough	Kerrier
Kerrier Rural District	Kerrier
Launceston Borough	North Cornwall
Launceston Rural District	North Cornwall
Liskeard Borough	Caradon
Liskeard Rural District	Caradon
Looe Urban District	Caradon
Newquay Urban District	Restormel
Penryn Borough	Carrick
Penzance Borough	Penwith
Saltash Borough	Caradon
St. Austell Rural District	Restormel
St. Austell with Fowey Borough	Restormel
St. Germans Rural District	Caradon
St. Ives Borough	Penwith
St. Just Urban District	Penwith
Stratton Rural District	North Cornwall
Torpoint Urban District	Caradon
Truro Borough	Carrick
Truro Rural District	Carrick
Wadebridge and Padstow Rural District	North Cornwall
West Penwith Rural District	Penwith

There were no county boroughs.

== Cumberland ==
District	Successor
Alston with Garrigill Rural District	Eden (Cumbria)
Border Rural District	Carlisle (Cumbria)
Cockermouth Rural District	Allerdale (Cumbria)
Cockermouth Urban District	Allerdale
Ennerdale Rural District	Copeland (Cumbria)
Keswick Urban District	Allerdale
Maryport Urban District	Allerdale
Millom Rural District	Copeland
Penrith Rural District	Eden
Penrith Urban District	Eden
Whitehaven Borough	Copeland
Wigton Rural District	Allerdale
Workington Borough	Allerdale

Carlisle was a county borough.

== Derbyshire ==
District	Successor
Alfreton Urban District	Amber Valley
Ashbourne Rural District	West Derbyshire
Ashbourne Urban District	West Derbyshire
Bakewell Rural District	West Derbyshire
Bakewell Urban District	West Derbyshire
Belper Rural District	Amber Valley
Belper Urban District	Amber Valley
Blackwell Rural District	Bolsover
Bolsover Urban District	Bolsover
Buxton Borough	High Peak
Chapel en le Frith Rural District	High Peak
Chesterfield Borough	Chesterfield
Chesterfield Rural District	Chesterfield, North East Derbyshire
Clay Cross Urban District	North East Derbyshire
Clowne Rural District	Bolsover
Dronfield Urban District	North East Derbyshire
Glossop Borough	High Peak
Heanor Urban District	Amber Valley
Ilkeston Borough	Erewash
Long Eaton Urban District	Erewash
Matlock Urban District	West Derbyshire
New Mills Urban District	High Peak
Repton Rural District	South Derbyshire
Ripley Urban District	Amber Valley
South East Derbyshire Rural District	Erewash, South Derbyshire
Staveley Urban District	Chesterfield
Swadlincote Urban District	South Derbyshire
Whaley Bridge Urban District	High Peak
Wirksworth Urban District	West Derbyshire

Derby was a county borough.

== Devon ==
District	Successor
Ashburton Urban District	Teignbridge
Axminster Rural District	East Devon
Barnstaple Borough	North Devon
Barnstaple Rural District	North Devon
Bideford Borough	Torridge
Bideford Rural District	Torridge
Buckfastleigh Urban District	Teignbridge
Budleigh Salterton Urban District	East Devon
Crediton Rural District	Tiverton
Crediton Urban District	Tiverton
Dartmouth Borough	South Hams
Dawlish Urban District	Teignbridge
Exmouth Urban District	East Devon
Great Torrington Borough	Torridge
Holsworthy Rural District	Torridge
Honiton Borough	East Devon
Honiton Rural District	East Devon
Ilfracombe Urban District	North Devon
Kingsbridge Rural District	South Hams
Kingsbridge Urban District	South Hams
Lynton Urban District	North Devon
Newton Abbot Rural District	Teignbridge
Newton Abbot Urban District	Teignbridge
Northam Urban District	Torridge
Okehampton Borough	West Devon
Okehampton Rural District	West Devon
Ottery St. Mary Urban District	East Devon
Plympton St. Mary Rural District	South Hams
Salcombe Urban District	South Hams
Seaton Urban District	East Devon
Sidmouth Urban District	East Devon
South Molton Rural District	North Devon
St Thomas Rural District	Teignbridge, East Devon
Tavistock Rural District	West Devon
Teignmouth Urban District	Teignbridge
Tiverton Borough	Tiverton
Tiverton Rural District	Tiverton
Torrington Rural District	Torridge
Totnes Borough	South Hams
Totnes Rural District	South Hams

Exeter, Plymouth and Torbay were county boroughs.

== Dorset ==
District	Successor
Beaminster Rural District	West Dorset
Blandford Rural District	North Dorset
Blandford Forum Borough	North Dorset
Bridport Borough	West Dorset
Bridport Rural District	West Dorset
Dorchester Borough	West Dorset
Dorchester Rural District	West Dorset
Lyme Regis Borough	West Dorset
Poole Borough	Poole
Portland Urban District	Weymouth and Portland
Shaftesbury Borough	North Dorset
Shaftesbury Rural District	North Dorset
Sherborne Rural District	West Dorset
Sherborne Urban District	West Dorset
Sturminster Rural District	North Dorset
Swanage Urban District	Purbeck
Wareham Borough	Purbeck
Wareham and Purbeck Rural District	Purbeck
Weymouth and Melcombe Regis Borough	Weymouth and Portland
Wimborne and Cranborne Rural District	East Dorset
Wimborne Minster Urban District	East Dorset

== Durham ==
District	Successor
Barnard Castle Rural District	Teesdale
Barnard Castle Urban District	Teesdale
Bishop Auckland Urban District	Wear Valley
Blaydon Urban District	Gateshead (Tyne and Wear)
Boldon Urban District	South Tyneside (Tyne and Wear)
Brandon and Byshottles Urban District	Durham
Chester-le-Street Rural District	City of Sunderland (Tyne and Wear), Gateshead, Chester-le-Street
Chester-le-Street Urban District	Chester-le-Street
Consett Urban District	Derwentside
Crook and Willington Urban District	Wear Valley
Darlington Rural District	Darlington, Sedgefield
Durham Borough	Durham
Durham Rural District	Durham
Easington Rural District	Easington, Sunderland
Felling Urban District	Gateshead
Hebburn Urban District	South Tyneside
Hetton Urban District	Sunderland
Houghton-le-Spring Urban District	Sunderland
Jarrow Borough	South Tyneside
Lanchester Rural District	Derwentside
Ryton Urban District	Gateshead
Seaham Urban District	Easington
Sedgefield Rural District	Sedgefield
Shildon Urban District	Sedgefield
Spennymoor Urban District	Sedgefield
Stanley Urban District	Derwentside
Stockton Rural District	Stockton-on-Tees (Cleveland), Hartlepool (Cleveland)
Tow Law Urban District	Wear Valley
Washington Urban District	Sunderland
Weardale Rural District	Wear Valley
Whickham Urban District	Gateshead

Darlington, Gateshead, Hartlepool, South Shields, Sunderland and Teesside were county boroughs.

== East Suffolk ==
District	Successor
Aldeburgh Borough	Suffolk Coastal (Suffolk)
Beccles Borough	Waveney (Suffolk)
Blyth Rural District	Suffolk Coastal
Bungay Urban District	Waveney
Deben Rural District	Suffolk Coastal
Eye Borough	Mid Suffolk (Suffolk)
Felixstowe Urban District	Suffolk Coastal
Gipping Rural District	Mid Suffolk
Halesworth Urban District	Waveney
Hartismere Rural District	Mid Suffolk
Leiston-cum-Sizewell Urban District	Suffolk Coastal
Lothingland Rural District	Great Yarmouth (Norfolk), Waveney
Lowestoft Borough	Waveney
Samford Rural District	Babergh (Suffolk)
Saxmundham Urban District	Suffolk Coastal
Southwold Borough	Waveney
Stowmarket Urban District	Mid Suffolk
Wainford Rural District	Waveney
Woodbridge Urban District	Suffolk Coastal

Ipswich was a county borough.

== East Sussex ==
District	Successor
Battle Rural District	Rother
Bexhill Borough	Rother
Burgess Hill Urban District	Mid Sussex (West Sussex)
Chailey Rural District	Lewes
Cuckfield Rural District	Mid Sussex, Crawley (West Sussex)
Cuckfield Urban District	Mid Sussex
East Grinstead Urban District	Mid Sussex
Hailsham Rural District	Wealden
Hove Borough	Hove
Lewes Borough	Lewes
Newhaven Urban District	Lewes
Portslade-by-Sea Urban District	Hove
Rye Borough	Rother
Seaford Urban District	Lewes
Uckfield Rural District	Wealden

Brighton, Eastbourne and Hastings were county boroughs.

== Essex ==
District	Successor
Basildon Urban District	Basildon
Benfleet Urban District	Castle Point
Braintree Rural District	Braintree
Braintree and Bocking Urban District	Braintree
Brentwood Urban District	Brentwood
Brightlingsea Urban District	Tendring
Burnham-on-Crouch Urban District	Maldon
Canvey Island Urban District	Castle Point
Chelmsford Borough	Chelmsford
Chelmsford Rural District	Chelmsford, Brentwood
Chigwell Urban District	Epping Forest
Clacton Urban District	Tendring
Colchester Borough	Colchester
Dunmow Rural District	Uttlesford
Epping Urban District	Epping Forest
Epping and Ongar Rural District	Brentwood, Epping Forest
Frinton and Walton Urban District	Tendring
Halstead Rural District	Braintree
Halstead Urban District	Braintree
Harlow Urban District	Harlow
Harwich Borough	Tendring
Lexden and Winstree Rural District	Colchester
Maldon Borough	Maldon
Maldon Rural District	Maldon
Rayleigh Urban District	Rochford
Rochford Rural District	Rochford
Saffron Walden Borough	Uttlesford
Saffron Walden Rural District	Uttlesford
Tendring Rural District	Tendring
Thurrock Urban District	Thurrock, Basildon
Waltham Holy Cross Urban District	Epping Forest
West Mersea Urban District	Colchester
Witham Urban District	Braintree
Wivenhoe Urban District	Colchester

Southend-on-Sea was a county borough.

== Gloucestershire ==
District	Successor
Charlton Kings Urban District	Cheltenham
Cheltenham Borough	Cheltenham
Cheltenham Rural District	Tewkesbury
Cirencester Rural District	Cotswold
Cirencester Urban District	Cotswold
Dursley Rural District	Stroud
East Dean Rural District	Forest of Dean
Gloucester Rural District	Stroud, Forest of Dean, Tewkesbury
Kingswood Urban District	Kingswood (Avon)
Lydney Rural District	Forest of Dean
Mangotsfield Urban District	Kingswood
Nailsworth Urban District	Stroud
Newent Rural District	Forest of Dean
North Cotswold Rural District	Cotswold
Northleach Rural District	Cotswold
Sodbury Rural District	Northavon (Avon), Stroud
Stroud Rural District	Stroud
Stroud Urban District	Stroud
Tetbury Rural District	Cotswold
Tewkesbury Borough	Tewkesbury
Thornbury Rural District	Northavon, Stroud
Warmley Rural District	Kingswood
West Dean Rural District	Forest of Dean

Bristol and Gloucester were county boroughs.

== Hampshire ==
District	Successor
Aldershot Borough	Rushmoor
Alton Rural District	East Hampshire
Alton Urban District	East Hampshire
Andover Borough	Test Valley
Andover Rural District	Test Valley
Basingstoke Borough	Basingstoke and Deane
Basingstoke Rural District	Basingstoke and Deane
Christchurch Borough	Christchurch (Dorset)
Droxford Rural District	Winchester
Eastleigh Borough	Eastleigh
Fareham Urban District	Fareham
Farnborough Urban District	Rushmoor
Fleet Urban District	Hart
Gosport Borough	Gosport
Hartley Wintney Rural District	Hart
Havant and Waterloo Urban District	Havant
Kingsclere and Whitchurch Rural District	Basingstoke and Deane
Lymington Borough	New Forest
New Forest Rural District	New Forest
Petersfield Rural District	East Hampshire
Petersfield Urban District	East Hampshire
Ringwood and Fordingbridge Rural District	New Forest, East Dorset (Dorset), Christchurch
Romsey Borough	Test Valley
Romsey Rural District	Test Valley
Stockbridge Rural District	Test Valley
Winchester Borough	Winchester
Winchester Rural District	Eastleigh, Winchester

Bournemouth, Portsmouth and Southampton were county boroughs.

== Herefordshire ==
District	Successor
Bromyard Rural District	Malvern Hills (Hereford and Worcester)
Dore and Bredwardine Rural District	South Herefordshire (Hereford and Worcester)
Hereford Borough	Hereford (Hereford and Worcester)
Hereford Rural District	South Herefordshire
Kington Rural District	Leominster (Hereford and Worcester)
Kington Urban District	Leominster
Ledbury Rural District	Malvern Hills
Leominster Borough	Leominster
Leominster and Wigmore Rural District	Leominster
Ross and Whitchurch Rural District	South Herefordshire
Ross-on-Wye Urban District	South Herefordshire
Weobley Rural District	Leominster

There were no county boroughs.

== Hertfordshire ==
District	Successor
Baldock Urban District	North Hertfordshire
Berkhamsted Rural District	Dacorum
Berkhamsted Urban District	Dacorum
Bishop's Stortford Urban District	East Hertfordshire
Braughing Rural District	East Hertfordshire
Bushey Urban District	Hertsmere
Cheshunt Urban District	Broxbourne
Chorleywood Urban District	Three Rivers
Elstree Rural District	Hertsmere
Harpenden Urban District	St Albans
Hatfield Rural District	Welwyn Hatfield
Hemel Hempstead Borough	Dacorum
Hemel Hempstead Rural District	Dacorum
Hertford Borough	East Hertfordshire
Hertford Rural District	Stevenage, East Hertfordshire
Hitchin Rural District	North Hertfordshire
Hitchin Urban District	North Hertfordshire
Hoddesdon Urban District	Broxbourne
Letchworth Urban District	North Hertfordshire
Potters Bar Urban District	Hertsmere
Rickmansworth Urban District	Three Rivers
Royston Urban District	North Hertfordshire
Sawbridgeworth Urban District	East Hertfordshire
St Albans Borough	St Albans
St Albans Rural District	St Albans, Dacorum
Stevenage Urban District	Stevenage
Tring Urban District	Dacorum
Ware Rural District	East Hertfordshire
Ware Urban District	East Hertfordshire
Watford Borough	Watford
Watford Rural District	Hertsmere, Dacorum, Three Rivers
Welwyn Rural District	Welwyn Hatfield
Welwyn Garden City Urban District	Welwyn Hatfield

There were no county boroughs.

== Huntingdon and Peterborough ==
District	Successor
Barnack Rural District	Peterborough (Cambridgeshire)
Huntingdon Rural District	Huntingdon (Cambridgeshire)
Huntingdon and Godmanchester Borough	Huntingdon
Norman Cross Rural District	Huntingdon, Peterborough
Old Fletton Urban District	Peterborough
Peterborough Borough	Peterborough
Peterborough Rural District	Peterborough
Ramsey Urban District	Huntingdon
St. Ives Borough	Huntingdon
St. Ives Rural District	Huntingdon
St. Neots Rural District	Huntingdon
St. Neots Urban District	Huntingdon
Thorney Rural District	Peterborough

There were no county boroughs.

== Isle of Wight ==
District	Successor
Cowes Urban District	Medina
Isle of Wight Rural District	South Wight
Newport Borough	Medina
Ryde Borough	Medina
Sandown-Shanklin Urban District	South Wight
Ventnor Urban District	South Wight

There were no county boroughs.

== Kent ==
District	Successor
Ashford Urban District	Ashford
Bridge-Blean Rural District	Canterbury
Broadstairs and St Peter's Urban District	Thanet
Chatham Borough	Rochester-upon-Medway
Cranbrook Rural District	Tunbridge Wells
Dartford Borough	Dartford
Dartford Rural District	Sevenoaks, Dartford
Deal Borough	Dover
Dover Borough	Dover
Dover Rural District	Dover
East Ashford Rural District	Ashford
Eastry Rural District	Dover, Thanet
Elham Rural District	Shepway
Faversham Borough	Swale
Folkestone Borough	Shepway
Gillingham Borough	Gillingham
Gravesend Borough	Gravesham
Herne Bay Urban District	Canterbury
Hollingbourne Rural District	Maidstone
Hythe Borough	Shepway
Lydd Borough	Shepway
Maidstone Borough	Maidstone
Maidstone Rural District	Maidstone
Malling Rural District	Tonbridge and Malling
Margate Borough	Thanet
New Romney Borough	Shepway
Northfleet Urban District	Gravesham
Queenborough-in-Sheppey Borough	Swale
Ramsgate Borough	Thanet
Rochester Borough	Rochester-upon-Medway
Romney Marsh Rural District	Shepway
Royal Tunbridge Wells Borough	Tunbridge Wells
Sandwich Borough	Dover
Sevenoaks Rural District	Sevenoaks
Sevenoaks Urban District	Sevenoaks
Sittingbourne and Milton Urban District	Swale
Southborough Urban District	Tunbridge Wells
Strood Rural District	Rochester-upon-Medway, Gravesham
Swale Rural District	Swale
Swanscombe Urban District	Dartford
Tenterden Borough	Ashford
Tenterden Rural District	Ashford
Tonbridge Rural District	Tunbridge Wells, Tonbridge and Malling
Tonbridge Urban District	Tonbridge and Malling
West Ashford Rural District	Ashford
Whitstable Urban District	Canterbury

Canterbury was a county borough.

== Lancashire ==
District	Successor
Abram Urban District	Wigan (Greater Manchester)
Accrington Borough	Hyndburn
Adlington Urban District	Chorley
Ashton-in-Makerfield Urban District	Wigan, Metropolitan Borough of St Helens (Merseyside)
Ashton-under-Lyne Borough	Tameside (Greater Manchester)
Aspull Urban District	Wigan
Atherton Urban District	Wigan
Audenshaw Urban District	Tameside
Bacup Borough	Rossendale
Barrowford Urban District	Pendle
Billinge and Winstanley Urban District	Wigan, St Helens
Blackburn Rural District	Hyndburn, Blackburn, Ribble Valley
Blackrod Urban District	Bolton (Greater Manchester)
Brierfield Urban District	Pendle
Burnley Rural District	Pendle, Ribble Valley, Burnley
Carnforth Urban District	Lancaster
Chadderton Urban District	Oldham (Greater Manchester)
Chorley Borough	Chorley
Chorley Rural District	Chorley
Church Urban District	Hyndburn
Clayton-le-Moors Urban District	Hyndburn
Clitheroe Borough	Ribble Valley
Clitheroe Rural District	Ribble Valley
Colne Borough	Pendle
Crompton Urban District	Oldham
Crosby Borough	Sefton (Merseyside)
Dalton-in-Furness Urban District	Barrow-in-Furness (Cumbria)
Darwen Borough	Blackburn
Denton Urban District	Tameside
Droylsden Urban District	Tameside
Eccles Borough	Salford (Greater Manchester)
Failsworth Urban District	Oldham
Farnworth Borough	Bolton
Fleetwood Borough	Wyre
Formby Urban District	Sefton
Fulwood Urban District	Preston
Fylde Rural District	Fylde
Garstang Rural District	Wyre
Golborne Urban District	Warrington (Cheshire), Wigan
Grange Urban District	South Lakeland (Cumbria)
Great Harwood Urban District	Hyndburn
Haslingden Borough	Rossendale
Haydock Urban District	St Helens
Heywood Borough	Rochdale (Greater Manchester)
Hindley Urban District	Wigan
Horwich Urban District	Bolton
Huyton-with-Roby Urban District	Knowsley (Merseyside)
Ince-in-Makerfield Urban District	Wigan
Irlam Urban District	Salford
Kearsley Urban District	Bolton
Kirkby Urban District	Knowsley
Kirkham Urban District	Fylde
Lancaster Borough	Lancaster
Lancaster Rural District	Lancaster
Lees Urban District	Oldham
Leigh Borough	Wigan
Leyland Urban District	South Ribble
Litherland Urban District	Sefton
Little Lever Urban District	Bolton
Littleborough Urban District	Rochdale
Longridge Urban District	Ribble Valley
Lunesdale Rural District	Lancaster
Lytham St. Anne's Borough	Fylde
Middleton Borough	Rochdale
Milnrow Urban District	Rochdale
Morecambe and Heysham Borough	Lancaster
Mossley Borough	Tameside
Nelson Borough	Pendle
Newton-le-Willows Urban District	St Helens
North Lonsdale Rural District	South Lakeland
Ormskirk Urban District	West Lancashire
Orrell Urban District	Wigan
Oswaldtwistle Urban District	Hyndburn
Padiham Urban District	Burnley
Poulton-le-Fylde Urban District	Wyre
Preesall Urban District	Wyre
Prescot Urban District	Knowsley
Preston Rural District	South Ribble, Preston, Ribble Valley
Prestwich Borough	Bury (Greater Manchester)
Radcliffe Borough	Bury
Rainford Urban District	St Helens
Ramsbottom Urban District	Rossendale, Bury
Rawtenstall Borough	Rossendale
Rishton Urban District	Hyndburn
Royton Urban District	Oldham
Skelmersdale and Holland Urban District	West Lancashire
Standish-with-Langtree Urban District	Wigan
Stretford Borough	Trafford
Swinton and Pendlebury Borough	Salford
Thornton Cleveleys Urban District	Wyre
Tottington Urban District	Bury
Trawden Urban District	Pendle
Turton Urban District	Bolton, Blackburn
Tyldesley Urban District	Wigan
Ulverston Urban District	South Lakeland
Urmston Urban District	Trafford
Walton-le-Dale Urban District	South Ribble
Wardle Urban District	Rochdale
Warrington Rural District	Warrington
West Lancashire Rural District	Sefton, Knowsley, West Lancashire
Westhoughton Urban District	Bolton
Whiston Rural District	Warrington, St Helens, Knowsley, Halton
Whitefield Urban District	Bury
Whitworth Urban District	Rossendale
Widnes Urban District	Halton (Cheshire)
Wigan Rural District	Wigan, West Lancashire
Withnell Urban District	Chorley
Worsley Urban District	Salford

Barrow-in-Furness, Blackburn, Blackpool, Bolton, Bootle, Burnley, Bury, Liverpool, Manchester, Oldham, Preston, Rochdale, Salford, Southport, St Helens, Warrington and Wigan were county boroughs.

== Leicestershire ==
District	Successor
Ashby de la Zouch Rural District	North West Leicestershire
Ashby de la Zouch Urban District	North West Leicestershire
Ashby Woulds Urban District	North West Leicestershire
Barrow upon Soar Rural District	Charnwood
Billesdon Rural District	Harborough
Blaby Rural District	Blaby
Castle Donington Rural District	North West Leicestershire
Coalville Urban District	North West Leicestershire
Hinckley Urban District	Hinckley and Bosworth
Loughborough Borough	Charnwood
Lutterworth Rural District	Harborough
Market Bosworth Rural District	North West Leicestershire, Hinckley and Bosworth
Market Harborough Rural District	Harborough
Market Harborough Urban District	Harborough
Melton and Belvoir Rural District	Melton
Melton Mowbray Urban District	Melton
Oadby Urban District	Oadby and Wigston
Shepshed Urban District	Charnwood
Wigston Urban District	Oadby and Wigston

Leicester was a county borough.

== Lincolnshire, Parts of Holland ==
District	Successor
Boston Borough	Boston (Lincolnshire)
Boston Rural District	Boston
East Elloe Rural District	South Holland (Lincolnshire)
Spalding Rural District	South Holland
Spalding Urban District	South Holland

There were no county boroughs.

== Lincolnshire, Parts of Kesteven ==
District	Successor
Bourne Urban District	South Kesteven (Lincolnshire)
East Kesteven Rural District	North Kesteven (Lincolnshire)
Grantham Borough	South Kesteven
North Kesteven Rural District	North Kesteven
Sleaford Urban District	North Kesteven
South Kesteven Rural District	South Kesteven
Stamford Borough	South Kesteven
West Kesteven Rural District	South Kesteven

There were no county boroughs.

== Lincolnshire, Parts of Lindsey ==
District	Successor
Alford Urban District	East Lindsey (Lincolnshire)
Barton upon Humber Urban District	Glanford (Humberside)
Brigg Urban District	Glanford
Caistor Rural District	West Lindsey (Lincolnshire)
Cleethorpes Borough	Cleethorpes (Humberside)
Gainsborough Rural District	West Lindsey
Gainsborough Urban District	West Lindsey
Glanford Brigg Rural District	Glanford
Grimsby Rural District	Cleethorpes
Horncastle Rural District	East Lindsey
Horncastle Urban District	East Lindsey
Isle of Axholme Rural District	Boothferry (Humberside)
Louth Borough	East Lindsey
Louth Rural District	East Lindsey
Mablethorpe and Sutton Urban District	East Lindsey
Market Rasen Urban District	West Lindsey
Scunthorpe Borough	Scunthorpe (Humberside)
Skegness Urban District	East Lindsey
Spilsby Rural District	East Lindsey
Welton Rural District	West Lindsey
Woodhall Spa Urban District	East Lindsey

Grimsby and Lincoln were county boroughs.

== Norfolk ==
District	Successor
Blofield and Flegg Rural District	Great Yarmouth, Broadland
Cromer Urban District	North Norfolk
Depwade Rural District	South Norfolk
Diss Urban District	South Norfolk
Docking Rural District	West Norfolk
Downham Rural District	West Norfolk
Downham Market Urban District	West Norfolk
East Dereham Urban District	Breckland
Erpingham Rural District	North Norfolk
Forehoe and Henstead Rural District	South Norfolk
Freebridge Lynn Rural District	West Norfolk
Hunstanton Urban District	West Norfolk
King's Lynn Borough	West Norfolk
Loddon Rural District	South Norfolk
Marshland Rural District	West Norfolk
Mitford and Launditch Rural District	Breckland
North Walsham Urban District	North Norfolk
Sheringham Urban District	North Norfolk
Smallburgh Rural District	North Norfolk
St. Faith's and Aylsham Rural District	Broadland
Swaffham Rural District	Breckland
Swaffham Urban District	Breckland
Thetford Borough	Breckland
Walsingham Rural District	North Norfolk
Wayland Rural District	Breckland
Wells-next-the-Sea Urban District	North Norfolk
Wymondham Urban District	South Norfolk

Great Yarmouth and Norwich were county boroughs.

== Northamptonshire ==
District	Successor
Brackley Borough	South Northamptonshire
Brackley Rural District	South Northamptonshire
Brixworth Rural District	Northampton, Daventry
Burton Latimer Urban District	Kettering
Corby Urban District	Corby
Daventry Borough	Daventry
Daventry Rural District	Daventry
Desborough Urban District	Kettering
Higham Ferrers Borough	East Northamptonshire
Irthlingborough Urban District	East Northamptonshire
Kettering Borough	Kettering
Kettering Rural District	Corby, Kettering
Northampton Rural District	South Northamptonshire, Northampton
Oundle Urban District	East Northamptonshire
Oundle and Thrapston Rural District	East Northamptonshire
Raunds Urban District	East Northamptonshire
Rothwell Urban District	Kettering
Rushden Urban District	East Northamptonshire
Towcester Rural District	South Northamptonshire
Wellingborough Rural District	Northampton, East Northamptonshire, Wellingborough
Wellingborough Urban District	Wellingborough

Northampton was a county borough.

== Northumberland ==
District	Successor
Alnwick Rural District	Alnwick
Alnwick Urban District	Alnwick
Amble Urban District	Alnwick
Ashington Urban District	Wansbeck
Bedlingtonshire Urban District	Wansbeck
Belford Rural District	Berwick-upon-Tweed
Bellingham Rural District	Tynedale
Berwick-upon-Tweed Borough	Berwick-upon-Tweed
Blyth Borough	Blyth Valley
Castle Ward Rural District	Castle Morpeth, Newcastle upon Tyne (Tyne and Wear)
Glendale Rural District	Berwick-upon-Tweed
Gosforth Urban District	Newcastle upon Tyne
Haltwhistle Rural District	Tynedale
Hexham Rural District	Tynedale
Hexham Urban District	Tynedale
Longbenton Urban District	North Tyneside (Tyne and Wear)
Morpeth Borough	Castle Morpeth
Morpeth Rural District	Castle Morpeth
Newbiggin-by-the-Sea Urban District	Wansbeck
Newburn Urban District	Newcastle upon Tyne
Norham and Islandshires Rural District	Berwick-upon-Tweed
Prudhoe Urban District	Tynedale
Rothbury Rural District	Alnwick
Seaton Valley Urban District	Blyth Valley, North Tyneside
Wallsend Borough	North Tyneside
Whitley Bay Borough	North Tyneside, Blyth Valley

Newcastle upon Tyne and Tynemouth were county boroughs.

== Nottinghamshire ==
District	Successor
Arnold Urban District	Gedling
Basford Rural District	Rushcliffe, Broxtowe, Ashfield, Gedling
Beeston and Stapleford Urban District	Broxtowe
Bingham Rural District	Rushcliffe
Carlton Urban District	Gedling
East Retford Borough	Bassetlaw
East Retford Rural District	Doncaster (South Yorkshire), Bassetlaw
Eastwood Urban District	Broxtowe
Hucknall Urban District	Ashfield
Kirkby in Ashfield Urban District	Ashfield
Mansfield Borough	Mansfield
Mansfield Woodhouse Urban District	Mansfield
Newark Borough	Newark
Newark Rural District	Newark
Southwell Rural District	Newark
Sutton in Ashfield Urban District	Ashfield
Warsop Urban District	Mansfield
West Bridgford Urban District	Rushcliffe
Worksop Borough	Bassetlaw
Worksop Rural District	Doncaster, Bassetlaw

Nottingham was a county borough.

== Oxford ==
District	Successor
Banbury Borough	Cherwell
Banbury Rural District	Cherwell
Bicester Urban District	Cherwell
Bullingdon Rural District	South Oxfordshire
Chipping Norton Borough	West Oxfordshire
Chipping Norton Rural District	West Oxfordshire
Henley Rural District	South Oxfordshire
Henley-on-Thames Borough	South Oxfordshire
Ploughley Rural District	Cherwell
Thame Urban District	South Oxfordshire
Witney Rural District	West Oxfordshire
Witney Urban District	West Oxfordshire
Woodstock Borough	West Oxfordshire

Oxford was a county borough.

== Rutland ==
District	Successor
Ketton Rural District	Rutland (Leicestershire)
Oakham Rural District	Rutland
Oakham Urban District	Rutland
Uppingham Rural District	Rutland

There were no county boroughs.

== Shropshire (Salop) ==
District	Successor
Atcham Rural District	Shrewsbury and Atcham
Bridgnorth Rural District	Bridgnorth
Clun and Bishop's Castle Rural District	South Shropshire
Dawley Urban District	The Wrekin
Ludlow Rural District	South Shropshire
Market Drayton Rural District	North Shropshire
Newport Urban District	The Wrekin
North Shropshire Rural District	North Shropshire
Oakengates Urban District	The Wrekin
Oswestry Rural District	Oswestry
Shifnal Rural District	The Wrekin, Bridgnorth
Shrewsbury Borough	Shrewsbury and Atcham
Wellington Rural District	The Wrekin
Wellington, Shropshire Urban District	The Wrekin

There were no county boroughs.

== Somerset ==
District	Successor
Axbridge Rural District	Woodspring (Avon), Sedgemoor, Mendip
Bathavon Rural District	Wansdyke (Avon)
Bridgwater Borough	Sedgemoor
Bridgwater Rural District	Sedgemoor
Burnham-on-Sea Urban District	Sedgemoor
Chard Borough	Yeovil
Chard Rural District	Yeovil
Clevedon Urban District	Woodspring
Clutton Rural District	Wansdyke, Mendip
Crewkerne Urban District	Yeovil
Dulverton Rural District	West Somerset
Frome Rural District	Mendip
Frome Urban District	Mendip
Glastonbury Borough	Mendip
Ilminster Urban District	Yeovil
Keynsham Urban District	Wansdyke
Langport Rural District	Yeovil
Long Ashton Rural District	Woodspring
Minehead Urban District	West Somerset
Norton-Radstock Urban District	Wansdyke
Portishead Urban District	Woodspring
Shepton Mallet Rural District	Mendip
Shepton Mallet Urban District	Mendip
Street Urban District	Mendip
Taunton Borough	Taunton Deane
Taunton Rural District	Taunton Deane
Watchet Urban District	West Somerset
Wellington Rural District	Taunton Deane
Wellington Urban District	Taunton Deane
Wells Borough	Mendip
Wells Rural District	Mendip
Weston-super-Mare Borough	Woodspring
Williton Rural District	West Somerset
Wincanton Rural District	Yeovil
Yeovil Borough	Yeovil
Yeovil Rural District	Yeovil

Bath (and Bristol) were county boroughs.

== Staffordshire ==
District	Successor
Aldridge-Brownhills Urban District	Walsall (West Midlands)
Biddulph Urban District	Staffordshire Moorlands
Cannock Rural District	South Staffordshire
Cannock Urban District	Cannock Chase
Cheadle Rural District	Staffordshire Moorlands
Kidsgrove Urban District	Newcastle-under-Lyme
Leek Rural District	Staffordshire Moorlands
Leek Urban District	Staffordshire Moorlands
Lichfield Borough	Lichfield
Lichfield Rural District	Cannock Chase, Lichfield
Newcastle-under-Lyme Borough	Newcastle-under-Lyme
Newcastle-under-Lyme Rural District	Newcastle-under-Lyme
Rugeley Urban District	Cannock Chase
Seisdon Rural District	South Staffordshire
Stafford Borough	Stafford
Stafford Rural District	Stafford
Stone Rural District	Stafford
Stone Urban District	Stafford
Tamworth Borough	Tamworth
Tutbury Rural District	East Staffordshire
Uttoxeter Rural District	East Staffordshire
Uttoxeter Urban District	East Staffordshire

Burton upon Trent, Dudley, Stoke-on-Trent, Walsall, West Bromwich and Wolverhampton were county boroughs.

== Surrey ==
District	Successor
Bagshot Rural District	Surrey Heath
Banstead Urban District	Reigate and Banstead
Caterham and Warlingham Urban District	Tandridge
Chertsey Urban District	Runnymede
Dorking Urban District	Mole Valley
Dorking and Horley Rural District	Crawley (West Sussex), Mole Valley, Reigate and Banstead
Egham Urban District	Runnymede
Epsom and Ewell Borough	Epsom and Ewell
Esher Urban District	Elmbridge
Farnham Urban District	Waverley
Frimley and Camberley Urban District	Surrey Heath
Godalming Borough	Waverley
Godstone Rural District	Tandridge
Guildford Borough	Guildford
Guildford Rural District	Guildford
Hambledon Rural District	Waverley
Haslemere Urban District	Waverley
Leatherhead Urban District	Mole Valley
Reigate Borough	Reigate and Banstead
Staines Urban District	Spelthorne
Sunbury-on-Thames Urban District	Spelthorne
Walton and Weybridge Urban District	Elmbridge
Woking Urban District	Woking

There were no county boroughs.

== Warwickshire ==
District	Successor
Alcester Rural District	Stratford-on-Avon
Atherstone Rural District	North Warwickshire
Bedworth Urban District	Nuneaton
Kenilworth Urban District	Warwick
Meriden Rural District	Solihull (West Midlands), North Warwickshire, Coventry (West Midlands)
Nuneaton Borough	Nuneaton
Royal Leamington Spa Borough	Warwick
Rugby Borough	Rugby
Rugby Rural District	Rugby
Shipston on Stour Rural District	Stratford-on-Avon
Southam Rural District	Stratford-on-Avon
Stratford-on-Avon Rural District	Solihull, Stratford-on-Avon
Stratford-upon-Avon Borough	Stratford-on-Avon
Sutton Coldfield Borough	Birmingham (West Midlands)
Warwick Borough	Warwick
Warwick Rural District	Warwick

Coventry, Solihull and Birmingham were county boroughs.

== West Suffolk ==
District	Successor
Bury St. Edmunds Borough	St Edmundsbury (Suffolk)
Clare Rural District	St Edmundsbury
Cosford Rural District	Babergh (Suffolk)
Hadleigh Urban District	Babergh
Haverhill Urban District	St Edmundsbury
Melford Rural District	Babergh
Mildenhall Rural District	Forest Heath (Suffolk)
Newmarket Urban District	Forest Heath
Sudbury Borough	Babergh
Thedwastre Rural District	Mid Suffolk (Suffolk)
Thingoe Rural District	St Edmundsbury

There were no county boroughs.

== West Sussex ==
District	Successor
Arundel Borough	Arun
Bognor Regis Urban District	Arun
Chanctonbury Rural District	Horsham
Chichester Borough	Chichester
Chichester Rural District	Arun, Chichester
Crawley Urban District	Crawley
Horsham Rural District	Horsham
Horsham Urban District	Horsham
Littlehampton Urban District	Arun
Midhurst Rural District	Chichester
Petworth Rural District	Chichester
Shoreham-by-Sea Urban District	Adur
Southwick Urban District	Adur
Worthing Borough	Worthing
Worthing Rural District	Adur, Arun

There were no county boroughs.

== Westmorland ==
District	Successor
Appleby Borough	Eden (Cumbria)
Kendal Borough	South Lakeland (Cumbria)
Lakes Urban District	Eden, South Lakeland
North Westmorland Rural District	Eden
South Westmorland Rural District	South Lakeland
Windermere Urban District	South Lakeland

There were no county boroughs.

== Wiltshire ==
District	Successor
Amesbury Rural District	Salisbury
Bradford and Melksham Rural District	West Wiltshire
Bradford-on-Avon Urban District	West Wiltshire
Calne Borough	North Wiltshire
Calne and Chippenham Rural District	North Wiltshire
Chippenham Borough	North Wiltshire
Cricklade and Wootton Bassett Rural District	North Wiltshire
Devizes Borough	Kennet
Devizes Rural District	Kennet
Highworth Rural District	Thamesdown
Malmesbury Borough	North Wiltshire
Malmesbury Rural District	North Wiltshire
Marlborough Borough	Kennet
Marlborough and Ramsbury Rural District	Kennet
Melksham Urban District	West Wiltshire
Mere and Tisbury Rural District	Salisbury
New Sarum Borough	Salisbury
Pewsey Rural District	Kennet
Salisbury and Wilton Rural District	Salisbury
Swindon Borough	Thamesdown
Trowbridge Urban District	West Wiltshire
Warminster Urban District	West Wiltshire
Warminster and Westbury Rural District	West Wiltshire
Westbury Urban District	West Wiltshire
Wilton Borough	Salisbury

There were no county boroughs.

== Worcestershire ==
District	Successor
Bewdley Borough	Wyre Forest (Hereford and Worcester)
Bromsgrove Rural District	Bromsgrove (Hereford and Worcester)
Bromsgrove Urban District	Bromsgrove
Droitwich Borough	Wychavon (Hereford and Worcester)
Droitwich Rural District	Wychavon, Worcester (Hereford and Worcester)
Evesham Borough	Wychavon
Evesham Rural District	Wychavon
Halesowen Borough	Dudley (West Midlands)
Kidderminster Borough	Wyre Forest
Kidderminster Rural District	Wyre Forest
Malvern Urban District	Malvern Hills (Hereford and Worcester)
Martley Rural District	Malvern Hills
Pershore Rural District	Worcester, Wychavon
Redditch Urban District	Redditch (Hereford and Worcester)
Stourbridge Borough	Dudley
Stourport-on-Severn Urban District	Wyre Forest
Tenbury Rural District	Leominster (Hereford and Worcester)
Upton upon Severn Rural District	Malvern Hills

Warley and Worcester were county boroughs.

== Yorkshire, East Riding ==
District	Successor
Beverley Borough	Beverley (Humberside)
Beverley Rural District	Beverley
Bridlington Borough	North Wolds (Humberside)
Bridlington Rural District	North Wolds, Scarborough (North Yorkshire)
Derwent Rural District	Selby (North Yorkshire)
Driffield Rural District	North Wolds
Driffield Urban District	North Wolds
Filey Urban District	Scarborough
Haltemprice Urban District	Beverley
Hedon Borough	Holderness (Humberside)
Holderness Rural District	Holderness
Hornsea Urban District	Holderness
Howden Rural District	Boothferry (Humberside)
Norton Rural District	Ryedale (North Yorkshire)
Norton Urban District	Ryedale
Pocklington Rural District	North Wolds
Withernsea Urban District	Holderness

Kingston upon Hull and York were county boroughs.

== Yorkshire, North Riding ==
District	Successor
Aysgarth Rural District	Richmondshire (North Yorkshire)
Bedale Rural District	Hambleton (North Yorkshire)
Croft Rural District	Richmondshire, Hambleton
Easingwold Rural District	Hambleton
Flaxton Rural District	Ryedale (North Yorkshire)
Guisborough Urban District	Langbaurgh (Cleveland)
Helmsley Rural District	Ryedale
Kirkbymoorside Rural District	Ryedale
Leyburn Rural District	Richmondshire
Loftus Urban District	Langbaurgh
Malton Rural District	Ryedale
Malton Urban District	Ryedale
Masham Rural District	Harrogate (North Yorkshire)
Northallerton Rural District	Hambleton
Northallerton Urban District	Hambleton
Pickering Rural District	Ryedale
Pickering Urban District	Ryedale
Reeth Rural District	Richmondshire
Richmond Borough	Richmondshire
Richmond Rural District	Richmondshire
Saltburn and Marske-by-the-Sea Urban District	Langbaurgh
Scalby Urban District	Scarborough (North Yorkshire)
Scarborough Borough	Scarborough
Scarborough Rural District	Scarborough
Skelton and Brotton Urban District	Langbaurgh
Startforth Rural District	Teesdale (County Durham)
Stokesley Rural District	Stockton-on-Tees (Cleveland), Middlesbrough (Cleveland), Hambleton
Thirsk Rural District	Harrogate, Hambleton
Wath Rural District	Harrogate
Whitby Rural District	Scarborough
Whitby Urban District	Scarborough

York and Teesside were county boroughs.

== Yorkshire, West Riding ==
District	Successor
Adwick le Street Urban District	Doncaster (South Yorkshire)
Aireborough Urban District	Leeds (West Yorkshire)
Baildon Urban District	Bradford (West Yorkshire)
Barnoldswick Urban District	Pendle (Lancashire)
Batley Borough	Kirklees (West Yorkshire)
Bentley with Arksey Urban District	Doncaster
Bingley Urban District	Bradford
Bowland Rural District	Ribble Valley (Lancashire)
Brighouse Borough	Calderdale (West Yorkshire)
Castleford Borough	Wakefield (West Yorkshire)
Colne Valley Urban District	Kirklees
Conisbrough Urban District	Doncaster
Cudworth Urban District	Barnsley (South Yorkshire)
Darfield Urban District	Barnsley
Darton Urban District	Barnsley
Dearne Urban District	Barnsley
Denby Dale Urban District	Kirklees
Denholme Urban District	Bradford
Dodworth Urban District	Barnsley
Doncaster Rural District	Doncaster
Earby Urban District	Pendle
Elland Urban District	Calderdale
Featherstone Urban District	Wakefield
Garforth Urban District	Leeds
Goole Borough	Boothferry (Humberside)
Goole Rural District	Boothferry
Harrogate Borough	Harrogate (North Yorkshire)
Hebden Royd Urban District	Calderdale
Heckmondwike Urban District	Kirklees
Hemsworth Rural District	Selby (North Yorkshire), Barnsley, Wakefield
Hemsworth Urban District	Wakefield
Hepton Rural District	Calderdale
Holmfirth Urban District	Kirklees
Horbury Urban District	Wakefield
Horsforth Urban District	Leeds
Hoyland Nether Urban District	Barnsley
Ilkley Urban District	Bradford
Keighley Borough	Bradford
Kirkburton Urban District	Kirklees
Kiveton Park Rural District	Rotherham (South Yorkshire)
Knaresborough Urban District	Harrogate
Knottingley Urban District	Wakefield
Maltby Urban District	Rotherham
Meltham Urban District	Kirklees
Mirfield Urban District	Kirklees
Mexborough Urban District	Doncaster
Morley Borough	Leeds
Nidderdale Rural District	Harrogate
Normanton Urban District	Wakefield
Osgoldcross Rural District	Selby, Wakefield
Ossett Borough	Wakefield
Otley Urban District	Leeds
Penistone Rural District	Barnsley
Penistone Urban District	Barnsley
Pontefract Borough	Wakefield
Pudsey Borough	Leeds
Queensbury and Shelf Urban District	Calderdale, Bradford
Rawmarsh Urban District	Rotherham
Ripon Borough	Harrogate
Ripon and Pateley Bridge Rural District	Harrogate
Ripponden Urban District	Calderdale
Rotherham Rural District	Rotherham
Rothwell Urban District	Leeds
Royston Urban District	Barnsley
Saddleworth Urban District	Oldham (Greater Manchester)
Sedbergh Rural District	South Lakeland (Cumbria)
Selby Rural District	Selby
Selby Urban District	Selby
Settle Rural District	Craven (North Yorkshire)
Shipley Urban District	Bradford
Silsden Urban District	Bradford
Skipton Rural District	Bradford, Craven, Pendle
Skipton Urban District	Craven
Sowerby Bridge Urban District	Calderdale
Spenborough Borough	Kirklees
Stanley Urban District	Wakefield
Stocksbridge Urban District	Sheffield (South Yorkshire)
Swinton Urban District	Rotherham
Tadcaster Rural District	Leeds, Selby
Thorne Rural District	Doncaster
Tickhill Urban District	Doncaster
Todmorden Borough	Calderdale
Wakefield Rural District	Wakefield
Wath upon Dearne Urban District	Rotherham
Wetherby Rural District	Harrogate, Leeds
Wharfedale Rural District	Leeds, Harrogate
Wombwell Urban District	Barnsley
Worsbrough Urban District	Barnsley
Wortley Rural District	Barnsley, Sheffield

Barnsley, Bradford, Dewsbury, Doncaster, Halifax, Huddersfield, Leeds, Rotherham, Sheffield, Wakefield and York were county boroughs.

== See also ==
- List of rural and urban districts in Wales
- List of rural and urban districts in Northern Ireland
- List of local government areas in Scotland 1930–75
