= Laura Barton =

English journalist and writer

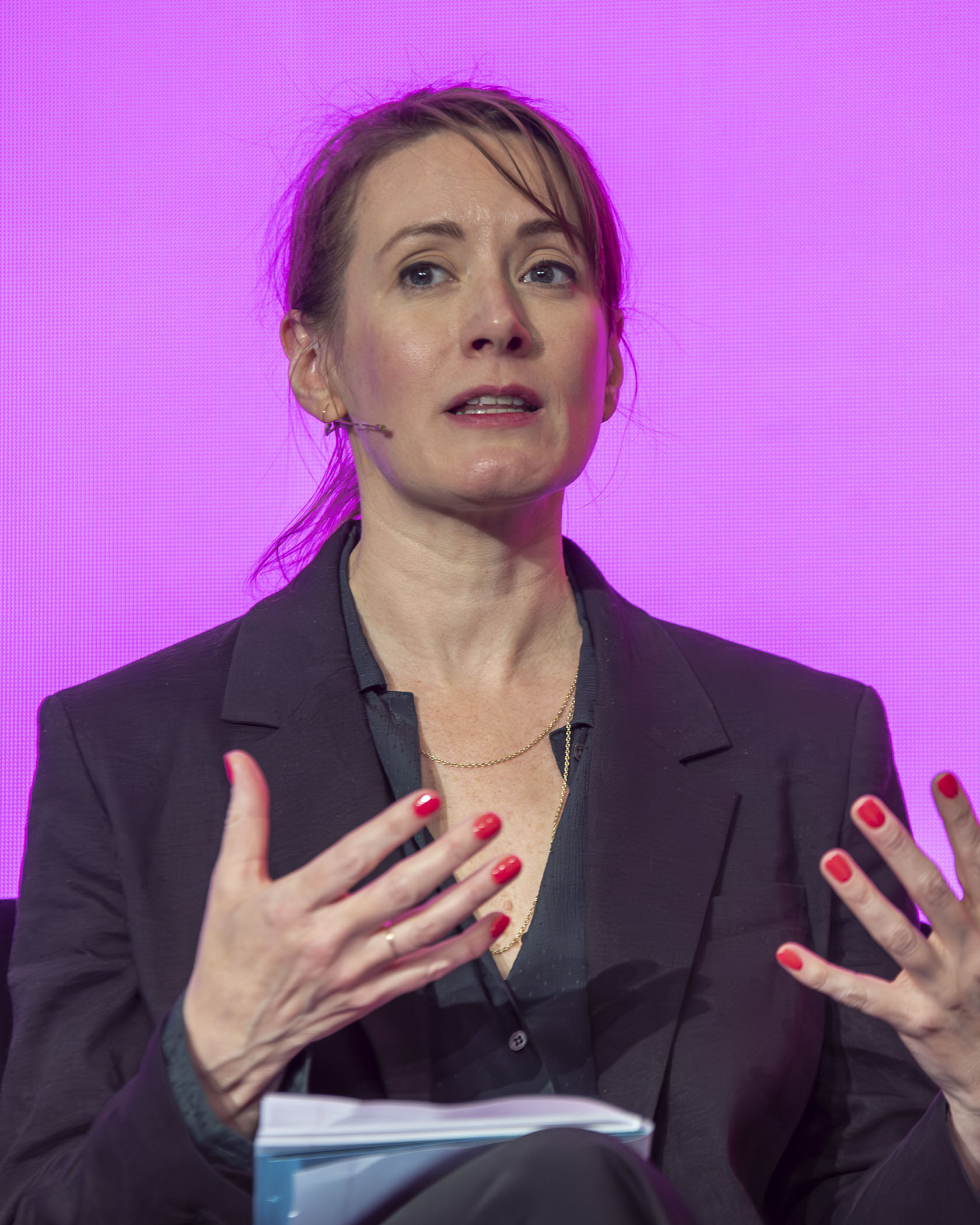
- Barton in 2025
- Born: 1977 (age 48–49); Newburgh, Lancashire
- Education: Worcester College, Oxford
- Occupations: Journalist, writer
- Writing career
- Subjects: Rock, pop music, women's issues

Laura Barton (born 1977) is an English journalist and writer. She writes mainly for The Guardian, and wrote a novel, Twenty-One Locks, published in 2010.

== Biography ==
Barton was born in and grew up in the village of Newburgh in Lancashire, and was educated at Winstanley College and read for an English degree at Worcester College, Oxford. Following graduation, she began writing for The Guardian from 2000 specialising in writing features. She has also written for Q magazine, The Word, and Intelligent Life, and broadcast on BBC Radio 4. Much of her writing relates to rock and pop music, and until late 2011 she wrote a fortnightly column about music for The Guardian's Film and Music supplement, called "Hail, Hail, Rock and Roll", as well as a weekly column on women's issues for the newspaper's G2 supplement, called "The View from a Broad".

Her novel, Twenty-One Locks (2010), recounts the story of "a young small-town girl facing the biggest decision of her life." Carol Birch, reviewing it in The Independent, said "Too much grim-up-north trowel-laying mars Laura Barton's otherwise promising first novel. ... Wonderful writing - but it's hard to engage with such a passively selfish central character." Also in the Independent Rob Sharp wrote "When she lets her words flow they become rhythmic; most of them, however, are painstakingly chiselled." and finishes "I look forward to Barton's second [book]." Rosamund Urwin of Evening Standard says "But while well-rendered, the book feels light on ideas. Twenty-One Locks could have been a short story rather than a novel."

Barton worked with photographer Sarah Lee on a photo-essay West of West: Travels along the edge of America, which was published by Unbound (2020, ISBN 978-1783527694) and featured in The Guardian and The New York Review of Books. Her memoir Sad Songs is to be published by Quercus books under its riverrun imprint on 1 May 2025 (ISBN 978-1529406948).

She made a three-part series Notes on Music for BBC Radio 4 in 2021, discussing the ages of seventeen in music, "happy sad songs", and Bruce Springsteen.

Barton has said she is working on a second novel and a non-fiction book about music. A series of short stories about Northern soul was broadcast on Radio 4 in 2011.

Barton married in 2004. She subsequently divorced.
