= Listed buildings in Balderstone, Lancashire =

Balderstone is a civil parish in Ribble Valley, Lancashire, England. It contains five listed buildings that are recorded in the National Heritage List for England. All of the listed buildings are designated at Grade II, the lowest of the three grades, which is applied to "buildings of national importance and special interest". The parish contains the village of Balderstone, and is otherwise rural. The listed buildings consist of two farmhouses, a farm building, a church, and a sundial in the churchyard.

== Buildings ==
Name and location	Photograph	Date	Notes
Sykes Holt Farmhouse; 53.77860°N 2.55348°W	—	c. 1600	A sandstone house with a slate roof in two storeys. The oldest part is gabled and projects forward, and there are one-bay extensions on both sides. The extensions contain modern windows, and the windows in the original part are mullioned. The doorway has a plain surround.
Old Chapel House barn 53.78606°N 2.56300°W	—	c. 1700	The barn is in sandstone and has a roof partly of slate and partly of stone-slate. To the left the roof of the shippon is carried forward, and to the right the roof forms a canopy over a wide entrance. Elsewhere are various doorways and windows, some of which have been altered.
Causeway Farmhouse; 53.77915°N 2.54076°W	—	Early 18th century (probable)	A sandstone house with a stone-slate roof, in two storeys and four bays. The doorway has a plain surround. The windows on the front are sashes, and at the rear there are two mullioned windows.
Sundial; 53.78541°N 2.56132°W	—	Early 19th century (possible)	The sundial is in the churchyard of St Leonard's Church. It is mainly in sandstone and has an octagonal base/ Five limestone columns with caps and bases support a circular head with a brass gnomon. Around the rim is an inscription.
St Leonard's Church; 53.78577°N 2.56082°W		1852–54	The church was built to replace an earlier church on the site, and the steeple was added in 1906–07 by Austin and Paley. The church is in sandstone with a slate roof, and consists of a nave, a chancel, a north organ loft, a gabled south projection, and a northwest steeple. The steeple has a tower with buttresses and incorporating a porch, and a spire set back behind the parapet. The windows contains Geometric tracery and there are two dormers in the roof on each side.
