= Listed buildings in Hothersall =

Hothersall is a civil parish in Ribble Valley, Lancashire, England. It contains two listed buildings that are recorded in the National Heritage List for England. Both of the listed buildings are designated at Grade II, the lowest of the three grades, which is applied to "buildings of national importance and special interest". They consist of a pair of gate piers and a house.

== Buildings ==
Name and location	Photograph	Date	Notes
Gate piers, Hothersall Hall; 53.80802°N 2.56023°W	—	18th century	A pair of gate piers at the entrance to the former Hothersall Hall, which has been demolished. They are in sandstone, and each pier has chamfered rustication, a frieze, a moulded cornice, and a ball finial.
Quaker Root; 53.81618°N 2.58050°W	—	Mid to late 18th century	A sandstone house with a slate roof in two storeys. The windows are mullioned. To the left a former barn and shippon have been incorporated into the house. These include a wide entrance with a segmental head and three doorways, all converted into windows.
