= Fylde College, Lancaster =

Constituent college of the University of Lancaster

Coordinates: 54.00874°N 2.78495°W

Fylde College
- University of Lancaster
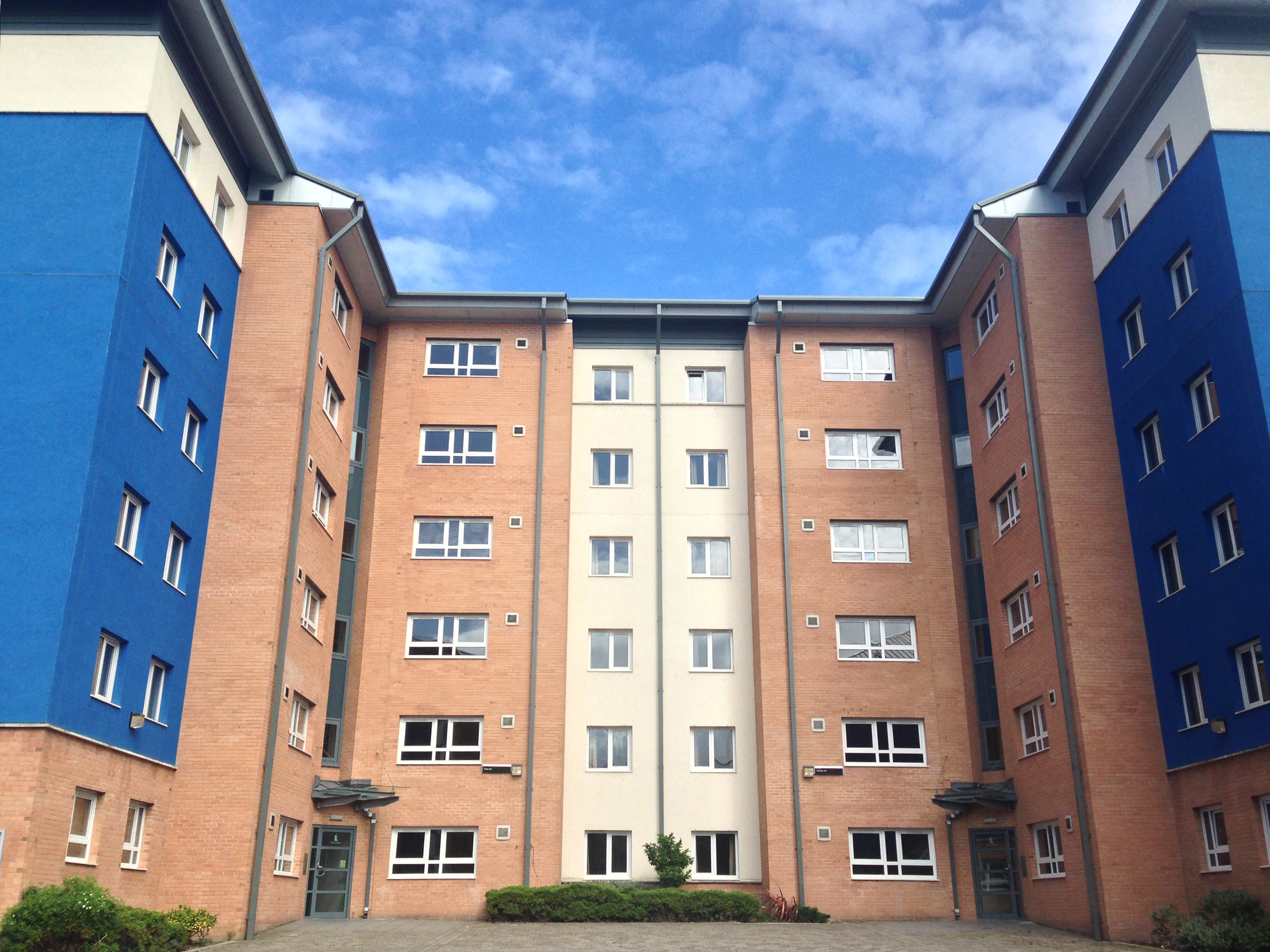
- Accommodation at Fylde College

- Motto: In arvo quaerere verum (Latin)
- Motto in English: Seek Truth in the Field
- Established: 1969
- Named after: The Fylde
- Colours: Orange Black
- Principal: Rebecca Heron
- JCR President: Holly Edwards
- Dean: Louise Tripp
- Undergraduates: 1590

Fylde College is a constituent college of the University of Lancaster, in Lancashire, England. The college was the sixth of the university’s colleges. Construction of the college buildings began in 1968 and the college began accepting students in 1969. The College officially opened in 1971. The college is named after the Fylde area of Lancashire.

== History ==
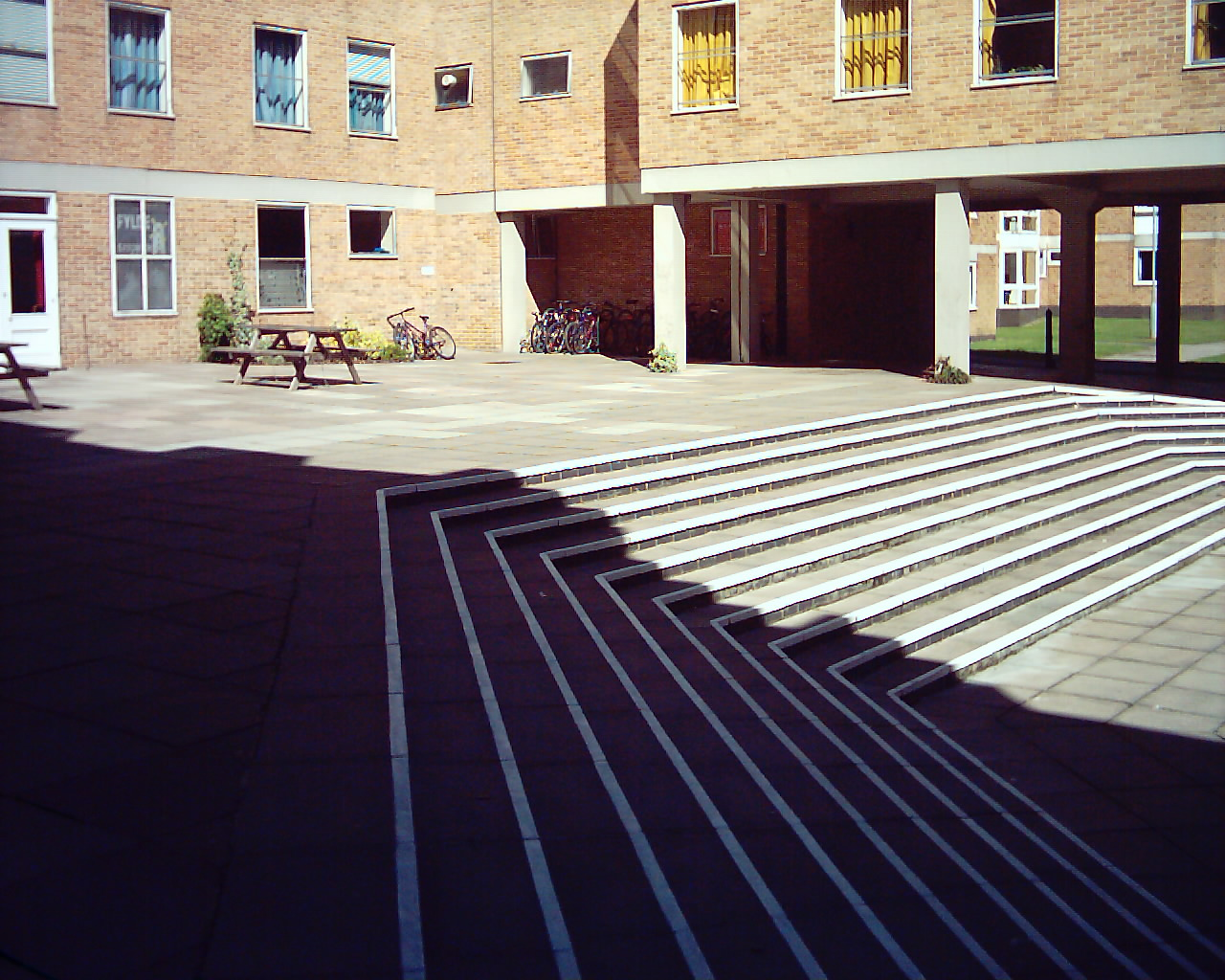
Fylde College Quadrangle

Talks of forming a sixth college in Lancaster University started in October 1968. A group of young lecturers formed "College 6", which they envisaged as a commune style College where students could have more influence over their college. The College officially came into being on 1 August 1969.

The first intake of students was planned for 1970, however, by 1968 the first phase of Furness College was completed ahead of schedule and £125,000 under budget so the University re-allocated this to the ‘Sixth College Project’ to build Blocks 3–7. These blocks were erected within just 12 months allowing it to offer accommodation to its first students from October 1969, a year ahead of schedule. The Assembly governed the College from Furness borrowing Bowland's JCR.

The lecturers advertised places for existing Lancaster second and third year students who wished to become part of their commune college. The ultra-left wing of the University took up their offer. Following the left-wing ethos of the founding lecturers the College formed an assembly with 68 elected positions rather than a JCR as in other colleges. Further, the students rejected the University’s plan to name the newly constructed Fylde residence blocks after areas of Lancashire, preferring names such as Lenin and Guevara. As a compromise the blocks were instead simply given numbers.

The College received four more blocks in 1970 and a College Building in 1971. More blocks were added to the College over the years; blocks 10–12 in the early 1980s and blocks 14 – 16 in the early 1990s.

Fylde had a reputation of being a socialist college. Its original second and third-year students were inspired by the events of May 1968 to seize the opportunity to establish a socialist commune. In 1969 Queen Elizabeth II came to open The County College. As she passed through Alexandra Square, the first Chairman of the College Assembly, Bill Corr, invested a Malayan toad Archduke of Lancaster. Overly eager press coverage saw this as a scandal. Further, its College building was never formally ‘opened’ in 1971, as planned, as the Minister for Higher Education was advised not to attend the opening as Fylde students had threatened to demonstrate about the level of grants on that day.

== Facilities ==
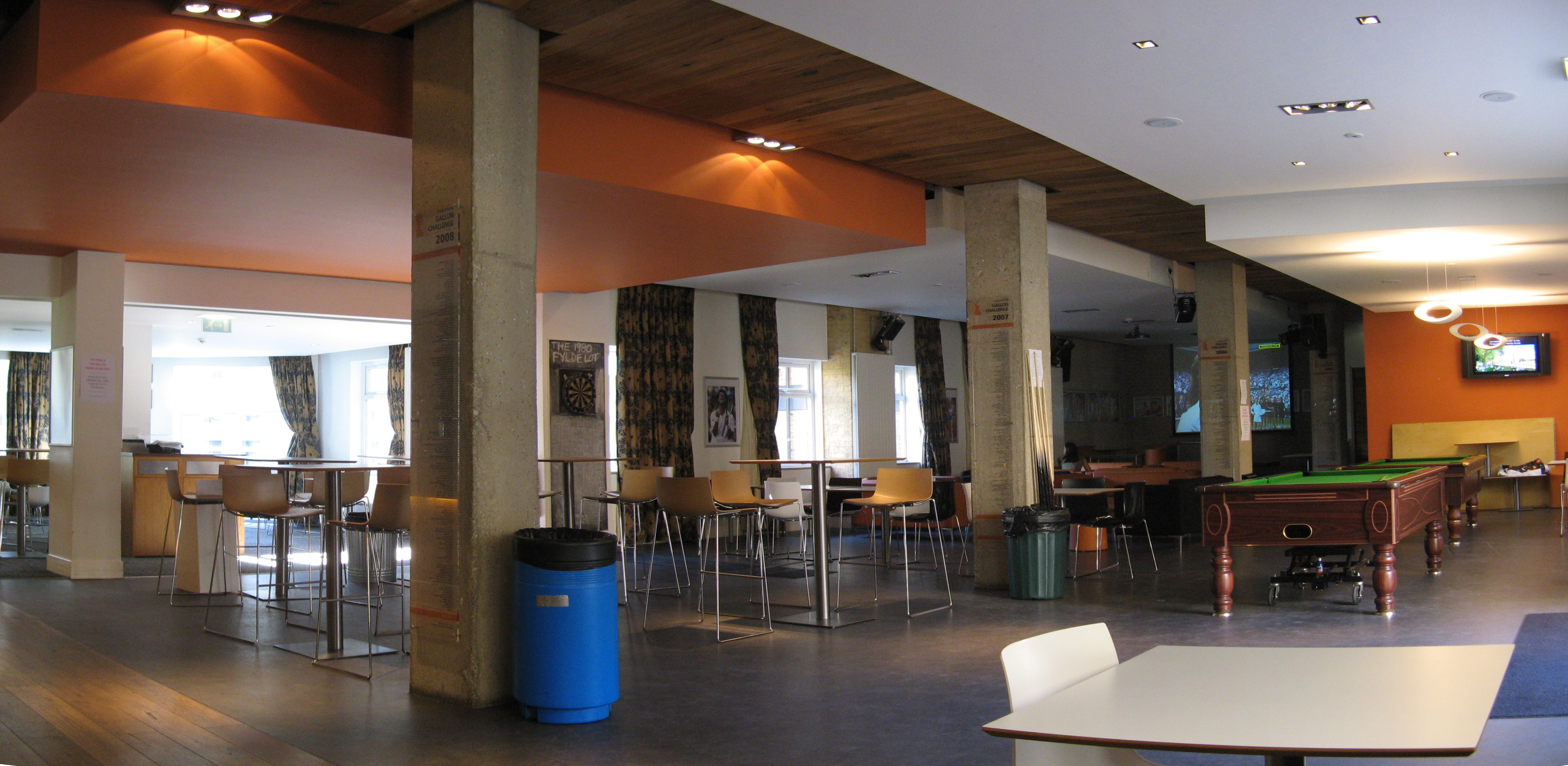
Fylde College bar

- Fylde College Bar — Is a sports bar serving food, with pool tables, dartboards, a big screen TV projector and satellite TV.
- Billiard Room — full size snooker table. Also known as the Clarke Memorial Snooker Room.
- Off Campus Suite — comprising study room, kitchenette and relaxing area and lockers for students not resident on campus.
- Group Study Room — will take 8–10 students for the purposes of group project and presentation preparation.
- Senior Common Room
- Junior Common Room – Contains a TV and a variety of seating for relaxing or casual study and group discussions.

=== Residences ===
In 2005 Fylde became the second college to be located on two separate sites, and offered en-suite residences in Alexandra Park, at the south west of the campus.

Fylde has since been reunited on its original site and is now one of the smaller colleges on campus. The residence houses built in 2006 are named after windmills on the Fylde:

- Clifton
- Kirkham
- Lytham
- Marton
- Pilling
- Thornton

In 2008 Fylde occupied a number of old and unrenovated ensuite rooms in the George Fox building. These rooms were renovated in 2019.

== Symbols ==
An older version of the JCR's windmill logo

The college motto is In arvo quaerere verum “Seek Truth in the Field.” In 1981 the college was granted license from the College of Arms to bear the arms initially granted to the former Fylde Rural District Council in 1959. This coat of arms includes a windmill, the Red Rose of Lancaster and two discs of water representing the River Lune and the River Ribble. The college emblem is a windmill and is represented in the JCR logo as a sketch of the Marsh Mill at Thornton. Fylde colours are old gold and green, now represented as orange and black.

== Sport ==
The College, which has a reputation for being 'The Home of Sport' in Lancaster University, has lost the Carter shield – the competition shield for sport – only once in 14 years.

Fylde Netball Team won the 2009–10 league. The Fylde B's men's football team were also crowned champions of their league in the 2011–12 season unbeaten.

Fylde also currently hold the Legends Shield after winning the first competition in 2010.

In 2013–14, Fylde's pool teams created a new record by being the first to win the men's A, B and women's league in the same season.

The college has also won 6 out of the 7 Legends tournament (Inter college). It registered its 2nd hattrick winning the tournament in 2014, 2015 and 2016 The college is also known for their Alumuni members coming back every year to defend the tournament.

== Notable alumni ==
- Richard Allinson, Radio presenter
- Louis Barfe, Journalist
- Lucy Rogers, Inventor and Science Communicator
