= Ormskirk Urban District =

Former local government area in the UK

Coordinates: 53.576°N 2.887°W

Ormskirk was an urban district in the county of Lancashire from 1894 to 1974. It was named after the town of Ormskirk, which constituted its main settlement.

The district was merged with Lathom and Burscough Urban District in 1931, taking in the villages of Burscough, Newburgh and Lathom.

It was abolished in 1974, under the Local Government Act 1972, merging with Skelmersdale and Holland, part of West Lancashire Rural District and part of Wigan Rural District to form West Lancashire District Council.
