= St Leonard's Church, Balderstone =

Coordinates: 53.7855°N 2.5604°W

- St Leonard's Church, Balderstone in 2024

- Location in the Borough of Ribble Valley
- OS grid reference: SD 631,323
- Location: Balderstone, Lancashire
- Country: England
- Denomination: Anglican
- Website: St Leonard, Balderstone

History
- Status: Parish church
- Founded: 1504 (?)
- Dedication: Saint Leonard
- Consecrated: (new church) 1854

Architecture
- Functional status: Active
- Heritage designation: Grade II
- Designated: 13 March 1986
- Architect(s): R. B. Rampling; Austin and Paley
- Architectural type: Church
- Style: Gothic Revival
- Completed: 1906

Specifications
- Materials: Sandstone, slate roofs

Administration
- Province: York
- Diocese: Blackburn
- Archdeaconry: Blackburn
- Deanery: Whalley
- Parish: St Leonard, Balderstone

Clergy
- Vicar: Revd Charles Jefferson

St Leonard's Church is in the village of Balderstone, Lancashire, England. It is an active Anglican parish church in the deanery of Whalley, the archdeaconry of Blackburn, and the diocese of Blackburn. The church is recorded in the National Heritage List for England as a designated Grade II listed building.

== History ==
St Leonard's was founded as a chapel of ease to the parish church in Blackburn during the reign of Henry VII; the usual date given is 1504. The fabric of the building deteriorated until in 1852 it was decided to replace it with a new church. Construction of this started during that year, and the present church was consecrated in 1854. It was designed by the Preston architect R. B. Rampling. The tower and spire were added in 1906–07 by the Lancaster architects Austin and Paley.

== Architecture ==
The church is constructed in sandstone rubble with slate roofs. Its plan consists of a four-bay nave, and a chancel at a lower level with a north organ chamber and a projection to the south. There is a polygonal baptistry at the west end, and a slim tower and spire at the west end of the north side of the nave. The baptistry has three windows, and above this is a three-light west window with a pointed head. The nave is divided into bays by buttresses, each bay containing a two-light window containing Geometric tracery. Projecting from the roof, on each side, are two timber dormer windows. The tower has diagonal buttresses, and contains a doorway with a pointed arch. The bell openings have two lights, and are louvred. The tower is surmounted by a parapet and a recessed spire. The east window has five lights under a pointed head, and contains Geometric tracery. Inside the church is an open timber roof. The two-manual pipe organ was made in 1872 by Henry Willis, and restored in 1974 by N. P. Mander.

== External features ==
In the churchyard, to the south of the church is a sandstone sundial dating possibly from the early 19th century, and re-erected at the beginning of the 20th century. It has an octagonal sandstone base with five limestone columns and a circular sandstone top containing a brass gnomon. The sundial is listed at Grade II. The churchyard also contains the war graves of six World War I soldiers.

== See also ==
- Listed buildings in Balderstone, Lancashire
- List of ecclesiastical works by Austin and Paley (1895–1914)
