= Lathom and Burscough Urban District =

Former local government area in the UK

Coordinates: 53.590°N 2.807°W

Lathom and Burscough
- Area
  - 1911: 13,660 acres (55.3 km^{2})
  - 1921: 13,642 acres (55.21 km^{2})
- Population
  - 1901: 7,113
  - 1921: 7,633
- History
  - Origin: local government district
  - Created: 1894
  - Abolished: 1931
  - Succeeded by: Ormskirk Urban District
- Status: urban district
- Government: Lathom and Burscough Urban District Council
  - HQ: Council Offices, Mill Lane, Lathom

Lathom and Burscough was an urban district in the county of Lancashire from 1894 to 1931. It constituted the civil parishes of Burscough and Lathom, and apart from these two villages also included Newburgh.

Lathom Local Government District was formed in 1872 when the parish of Lathom adopted the Local Government Act 1858, and a local board was formed to govern the area. In February 1894 the parish of Burscough was added to the local board's area. The area of the local board was subsequently reconstituted as an urban district by the Local Government Act 1894 as Lathom and Burscough, and an elected urban district council replaced the local board.

In 1931, the Lathom and Burscough Urban District was abolished under a County Review Order, and its area added to an enlarged Ormskirk Urban District.
