= Preston Rural District =

Former local government area in Lancashire, England

Coordinates: 53.758°N 2.703°W

Preston was a rural district in Lancashire, England from 1894 to 1974. It surrounded Preston to the north, west and east.

The district was created under the Local Government Act 1894. It was abolished in 1974 under the Local Government Act 1972 and its area split between the new districts of South Ribble, Preston and Ribble Valley.

It contained the following parishes:

- Barton, Broughton, Elston (until 1934 when merged into Grimsargh), Goosnargh, Grimsargh-with-Brockholes (until 1934 when merged into Grimsargh), Grimsargh (from 1934), Haighton, Lea Ashton Ingol and Cottam (until 1934 when split into Lea, Fulwood Urban District and the County Borough of Preston), Lea (from 1934), Whittingham and Woodplumpton which were all transferred to the Borough of Preston in 1974
- Dutton, Hothersall and Ribchester which were all transferred to Ribble Valley in 1974
- Cuerdale, Farington, Howick (until 1934 when merged into Penwortham), Hutton, The Holme (until merged into Penwortham), Little Hoole, Longton, Much Hoole, Penwortham and Samlesbury which were all transferred to South Ribble in 1974
- Ribbleton (until 1934 when absorbed into the County Borough of Preston)
