= Fylde Rural District =

Former rural district in Lancashire, England

Coordinates: 53.81°N 2.92°W

Fylde
- Population
  - 1901: 10,235
  - 1961: 17,370
- History
  - Created: 1894
  - Abolished: 1974
  - Succeeded by: Borough of Fylde
- Status: Rural district

Fylde Rural District was a rural district in the county of Lancashire, England. It was created in 1894 and abolished in 1974 under the Local Government Act 1972.

It comprised 21 civil parishes to the south of Fleetwood, east of Blackpool, north of Lytham and west of Preston.

Fylde College, University of Lancaster was named after the Fylde region of Lancashire and in 1981 was granted license from the College of Arms to bear the arms initially granted to the former Rural District Council in 1959.
