= Balderstone, Lancashire =

Village in Lancashire, England

Coordinates: 53.785°N 2.560°W

Balderstone
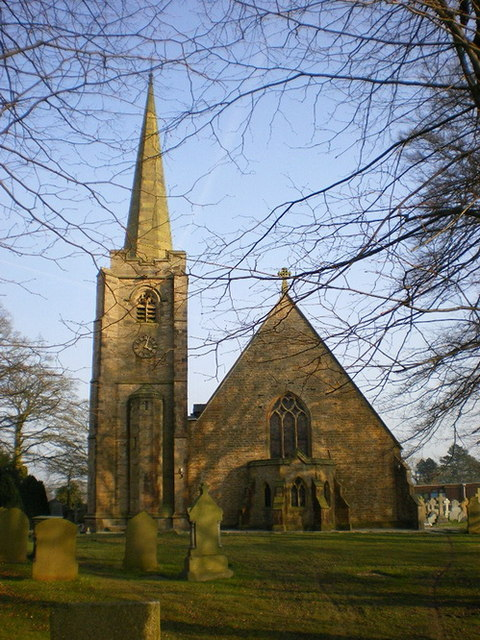
- St Leonard's church

- Shown within Ribble Valley Location within Lancashire
- Population: 402 (2011)
- OS grid reference: SD631323
- Civil parish: Balderstone
- District: Ribble Valley
- Shire county: Lancashire
- Region: North West
- Country: England
- Sovereign state: United Kingdom
- Post town: BLACKBURN
- Postcode district: BB2
- Dialling code: 01254
- Police: Lancashire
- Fire: Lancashire
- Ambulance: North West
- UK Parliament: Ribble Valley

Balderstone is a village and civil parish in the Ribble Valley district of Lancashire, England. The population of the Civil Parish taken at the 2021 census was 402.

== History ==
Although a relatively modern building, Sunderland Hall in the northeast corner of the parish, on the bank of the River Ribble, has roots in a medieval monastic grange. Around 1170, Ailsi son of Hugh, lord of Balderston and Osbaldeston, gave Sunderland Holme to the Cistercian monks who had founded Sawley Abbey. In 1540, after the dissolution of the monasteries, the site was among the former monastic lands owned by Sir Arthur Darcy. He sold it Sir Alexander Osbaldeston, whose grandson also called Alexander, built the original Sunderland Hall around 1596.

== Geography ==
It is located east of Preston and north-west of Blackburn.

== Community ==
In the village are the Anglican Church of St Leonard, a primary school, and a community centre. In the 2001 census it had a population of 379 and 1n the 2011 census it had a population of 410. The parish is the officially recognised address of Samlesbury Aerodrome.

== See also ==
- Listed buildings in Balderstone, Lancashire
