= Lunesdale Rural District =

Former local government area in the UK

Coordinates: 54.12°N 2.64°W

Lunesdale Rural District was a rural district in the county of Lancashire, England. It was created in 1894 and abolished in 1974 under the Local Government Act 1972.

It comprised 21 civil parishes to the east and north-east of the city of Lancaster, around the valley of the River Lune.

It had a population of 6,948 in 1901 and 8,224 in 1961.
