= Hothersall =

Civil parish in Lancashire, England

Coordinates: 53.82°N 2.58°W

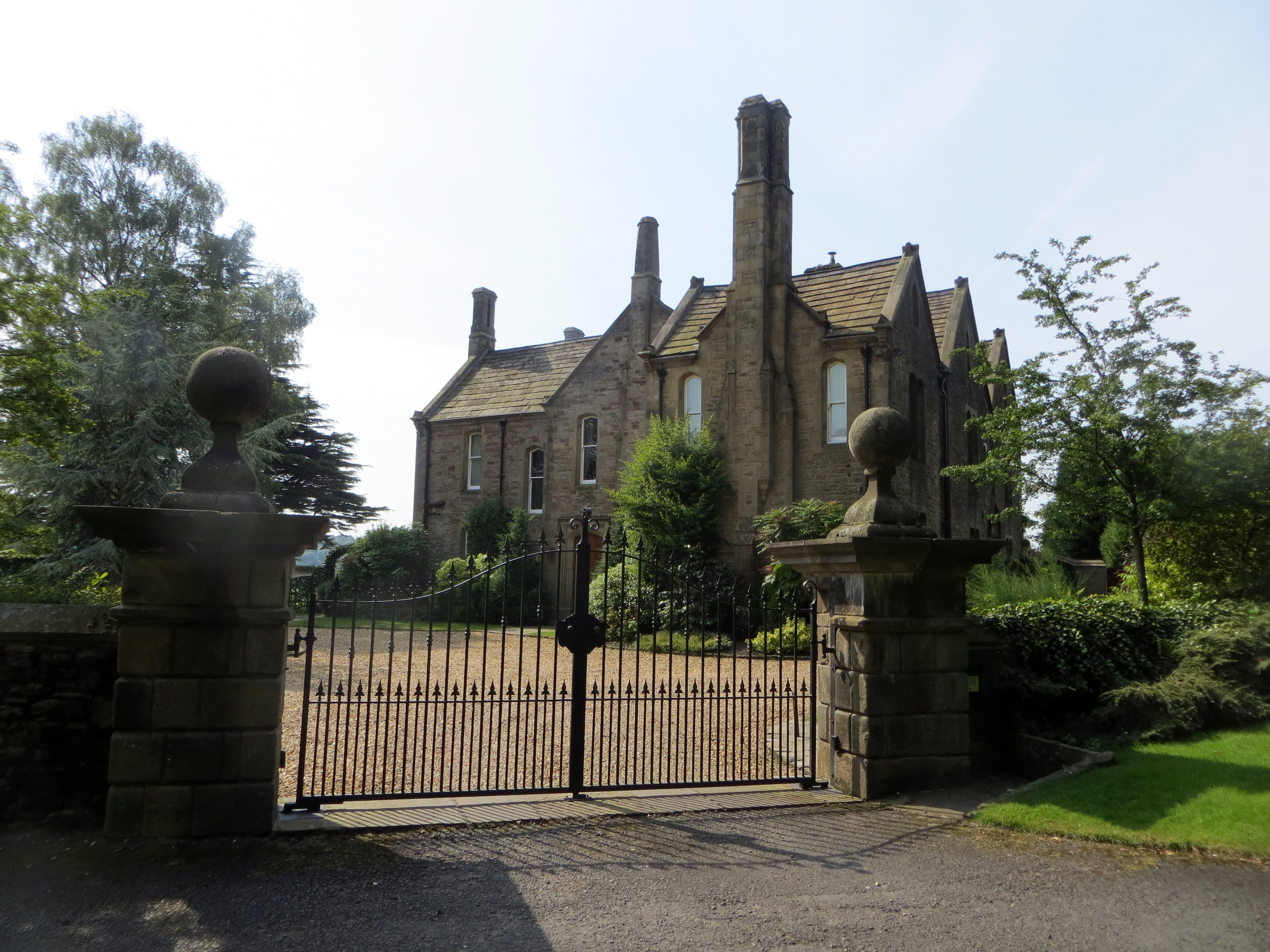
- Hothersall Hall

- Shown within Ribble Valley Location within Lancashire
- Population: 145 (2011 Census)
- Civil parish: Hothersall
- District: Ribble Valley
- Shire county: Lancashire
- Region: North West
- Country: England
- Sovereign state: United Kingdom
- Post town: PRESTON
- Postcode district: PR3
- Dialling code: 01772; 01254
- Police: Lancashire
- Fire: Lancashire
- Ambulance: North West
- UK Parliament: Ribble Valley

Hothersall is a civil parish in the Ribble Valley district, in Lancashire, England. The parish, which is on the north bank of the River Ribble, is rural and in the 2001 census had a population of 136, increasing to 145 at the 2011 Census. It is approximately 8 miles (13 km) north-east of Preston, and has boundaries with Longridge to the north and west, and Ribchester to the east.

Hothersall Hall, situated in the south of the parish, was the home of the Hothersall family from as early as the 12th century until it was sold in the 18th century; the hall was demolished in the 1850s and replaced by a house built in the Gothic style that now stands on the site.

The parish was part of Preston Rural District throughout the district's existence from 1894 to 1974. In 1974 the parish became part of Ribble Valley.

== See also ==
- Listed buildings in Hothersall
