= Chorley Rural District =

Rural district in Lancashire, England (1894–1974)

Coordinates: 53.6591°N 2.6595°W

- Area
  - 1911: 39,988
  - 1961: 41,117
- Population
  - 1901: 19,310
  - 1961: 28,567
- History
  - Origin: Sanitary district
  - Created: 1894
  - Abolished: 1974
  - Succeeded by: Borough of Chorley
- Status: Rural district
- Government
  - Motto: Latin: SPECTEMUR AGENDO (Let us be judged by our deeds)

Chorley Rural District was a rural district in the administrative county of Lancashire, England from 1894 to 1974.

The district was created by the Local Government Act 1894 as the successor to the Chorley Rural Sanitary District. It comprised an area surrounding but did not include the Municipal Borough of Chorley.

Under the Local Government Act 1972, the rural district was abolished in 1974 and its former area became part of the non-metropolitan Borough of Chorley.

== Parishes ==
The district consisted of twenty-two civil parishes:

- Anderton
- Anglezarke
- Bretherton
- Brindle
- Charnock Richard
- Clayton-le-Woods
- Coppull
- Croston (from 1934)
- Cuerdon
- Duxbury (until 1934)
- Eccleston
- Euxton
- Heapey
- Heath Charnock
- Heskin
- Hoghton
- Mawdesley
- Rivington
- Ulnes Walton
- Welch Whittle (until 1934)
- Wheelton
- Whittle-le-Woods
