= Blackburn Rural District =

Former local government area in the UK

Coordinates: 53.747°N 2.480°W

Blackburn was a rural district in Lancashire from 1894 to 1974.

It was named after, but did not include Blackburn, which was an independent county borough. It surrounded Blackburn on the north and western sides, and also included an exclave on the south-eastern side of Blackburn, consisting of the parishes of Yate and Pickup Bank and Eccleshill.

It was created in 1894 under the Local Government Act 1894. It lost the parish of Witton to Blackburn in the 1930s.

In 1974, under the Local Government Act 1972, the district was abolished. Its territory was split between the new districts of Blackburn and Ribble Valley.
