= Municipal Borough of Morecambe and Heysham =

Former local government district in Lancashire, England

Coordinates: 54.054°N 2.885°W

- Municipal borough
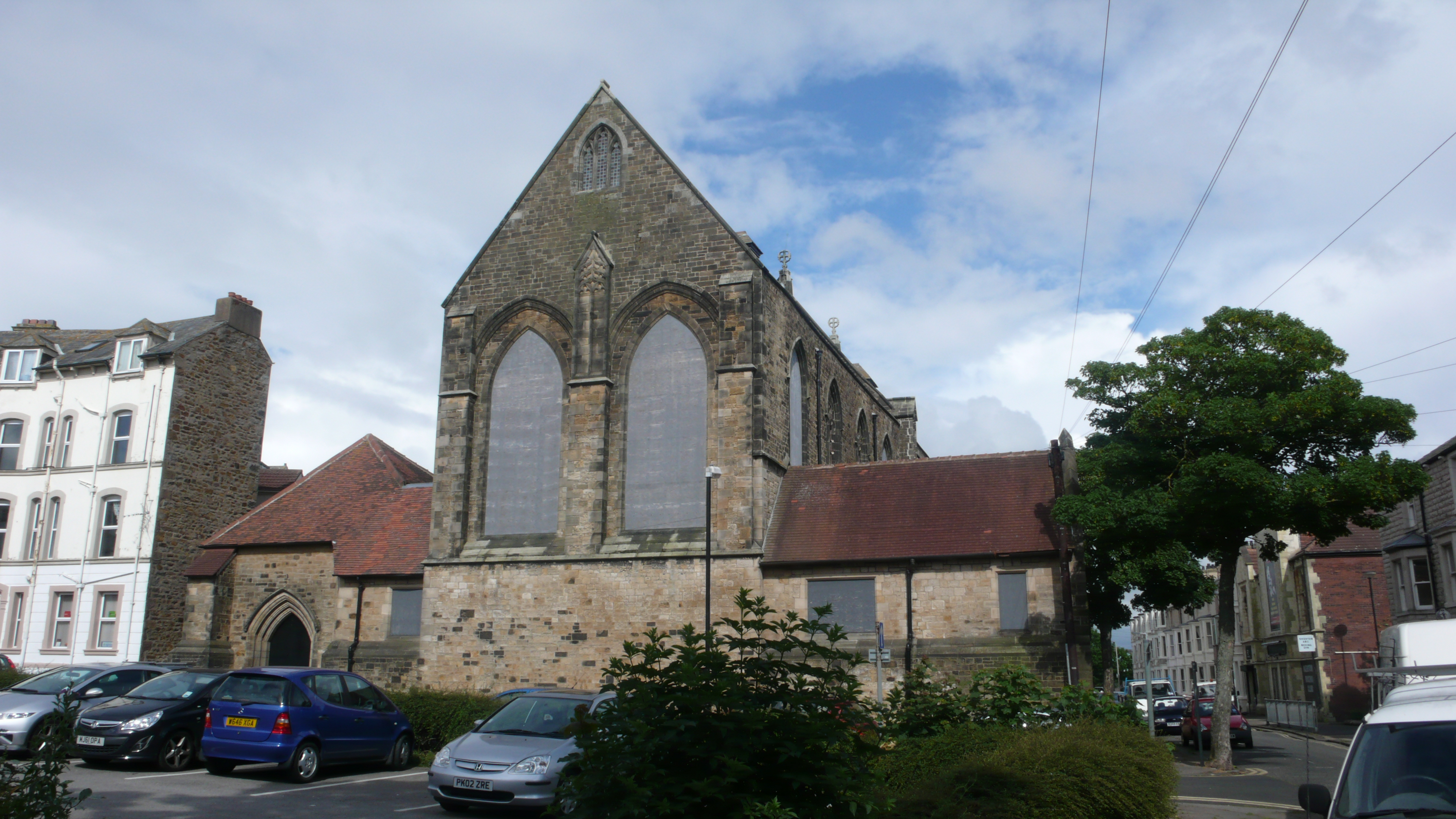
- Population
  - 1961: 40,228
- History
  - Abolished: 31 March 1974
  - Succeeded by: Lancaster
- Contained within
  - County: Lancashire

Morecambe and Heysham was a municipal borough in Lancashire, England. It was formed in 1928 by the merging of Morecambe Municipal Borough and Heysham Urban District, and abolished in 1974 when it was absorbed into the City of Lancaster local government district. In 1961 it had a population of 40,228.
