= Newburgh, Lancashire =

Village in Lancashire, England

Coordinates: 53.587°N 2.782°W

Newburgh
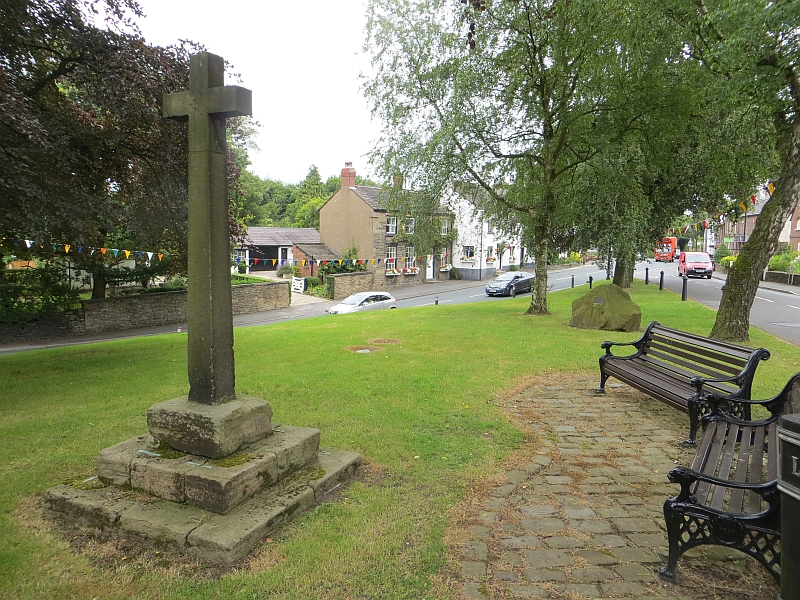
- Village green

- Location in West Lancashire Location within Lancashire
- Population: 1,056 (2011 Census)
- OS grid reference: SD482103
- Civil parish: Newburgh
- District: West Lancashire
- Shire county: Lancashire
- Region: North West
- Country: England
- Sovereign state: United Kingdom
- Post town: Wigan
- Postcode district: WN8
- Dialling code: 01257
- Police: Lancashire
- Fire: Lancashire
- Ambulance: North West
- UK Parliament: West Lancashire

Newburgh is a rural village and civil parish in Lancashire, England, 3 miles (5 km) from Skelmersdale and 5 miles (8 km) from Ormskirk. Its population in 2011 was 1,056 and 1,065 in 2021.

Newburgh's history can be traced back to 1304 when a licence was granted to start a weekly market. Previously part of Lathom and Burscough Urban District, Newburgh became part of Ormskirk Urban District in 1931 and part of West Lancashire district in 1974. The Newburgh ward comprises the parishes of Newburgh and Lathom. Historically it was part of the parish of Lathom.

The village has a conservation area at its centre and includes many historic Carolean and Georgian buildings, including the schoolhouse of 1714. In 2006, it won the Champion Village Class for the second time in the Lancashire Best Kept Village Competition. Accommodation is available at the Red Lion Hotel and there is a post office, village shop and tearoom. There is an Anglican church, Christ Church, founded in 1857, a primary school and two scout groups.

Newburgh Village Fete takes place every year in June.

Newburgh is twinned with the town of Newburgh, Indiana, United States.

== See also ==
- Listed buildings in Newburgh, Lancashire
