= Clitheroe Rural District =

Former district in Lancashire, England

Coordinates: 53.87°N 2.39°W

Clitheroe Rural District was a rural district in the county of Lancashire, England. It was created in 1894 and abolished in 1974 under the Local Government Act 1972.

It was based on Clitheroe and included 16 other civil parishes.

It had a population of 5,838 in 1901 and 8,799 in 1961.
