= Ribble Valley =

- Borough and non-metropolitan district
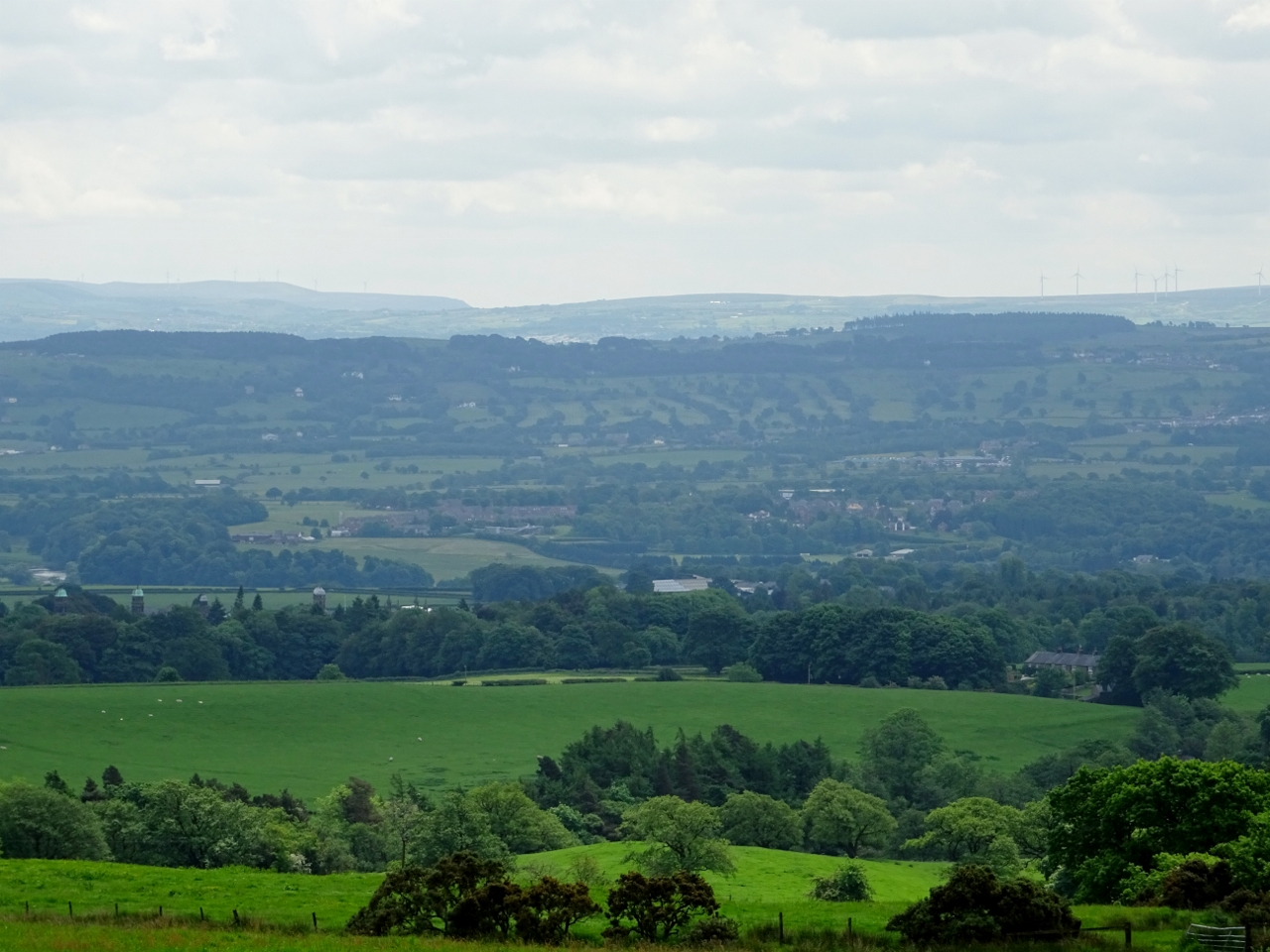
- The Ribble Valley

- Ribble Valley shown within Lancashire and England
- Sovereign state: United Kingdom
- Constituent country: England
- Region: North West England
- Ceremonial county: Lancashire
- Historic county: Lancashire and West Riding
- Admin. HQ: Clitheroe

Government
  - Type: Ribble Valley Borough Council
  - MPs: Maya Ellis

Area
  - Total: 225 sq mi (583 km^{2})
  - Rank: 63rd

Population (2025)
  - Total: 66,938
  - Rank: Ranked 289th
  - Density: 297/sq mi (115/km^{2})

Ethnicity (2021)
  - Ethnic groups: List: 96.2% White; 2.1% Asian; 1.2% Mixed; 0.3% other; 0.2% Black

Religion (2021)
  - Religion: List: 66.4% Christianity; 26.2% no religion; 5.3% not stated; 1.3% Islam; 0.3% Hinduism; 0.3% other; 0.2% Buddhism; 0.1% Sikhism; 0.1% Judaism
- Time zone: UTC+0 (Greenwich Mean Time)
  - Summer (DST): UTC+1 (British Summer Time)
- ONS code: 30UL (ONS); E07000124 (GSS)

Ribble Valley is a local government district with borough status in Lancashire, England. Its council is based in Clitheroe, the largest town. The borough also includes the town of Longridge and numerous villages and surrounding rural areas. It is named after the River Ribble. Much of the district lies within the Forest of Bowland, a designated Area of Outstanding Natural Beauty. Ribble Valley has a rich history especially its connections in folklore, the most infamous being the Pendle Witch Trials.

The neighbouring districts are Pendle, Burnley, Hyndburn, Blackburn with Darwen, South Ribble, Preston, Wyre, Lancaster and North Yorkshire.

== History ==
The district was created on 1 April 1974 under the Local Government Act 1972, covering the whole area of four former districts and parts of another three, which were abolished at the same time:

- Blackburn Rural District (north of Arley Brook, rest went to Blackburn)
- Bowland Rural District
- Burnley Rural District (parishes of Read and Sabden only, rest split between Burnley, Hyndburn and Pendle)
- Clitheroe Municipal Borough
- Clitheroe Rural District
- Longridge Urban District
- Preston Rural District (parishes of Dutton, Hothersall and Ribchester only, rest split between Preston and South Ribble)

The new district was named Ribble Valley after the River Ribble which flows through the area. The new district was awarded borough status from its creation, allowing the chair of the council to take the title of mayor.

The Bowland Rural District had been in the West Riding of Yorkshire prior to the reforms, whereas the other parts had all been in Lancashire. The council was granted a coat of arms in 1975, which includes both the Red Rose of Lancaster and White Rose of York, referencing the two historic counties.

The parish of Simonstone was transferred from Burnley to Ribble Valley in 1987.

Under current local government reorganisation plans, all district councils in Lancashire, as well as the county council, will be abolished in 2028, with the district becoming part of a new North Lancashire unitary authority.

== Governance ==
Ribble Valley Borough Council

Type
- Type: Non-metropolitan district

History
- Founded: 1 April 1974

Leadership
- Mayor: Jan Alcock, Conservative since 12 May 2026
- Leader: Simon Hore, Conservative since 13 May 2025
- Chief Executive: Sarah Threlfall since 4 January 2026

Structure
- Seats: 40 councillors
- Graph of the party split among 40 seats.
- Political groups: Administration (16) Conservative (16) Other parties (24) Liberal Democrats (6) Labour (5) Reform (4) Green (2) Independent (7)

Elections
- Voting system: First past the post
- Last election: 4 May 2023

Meeting place
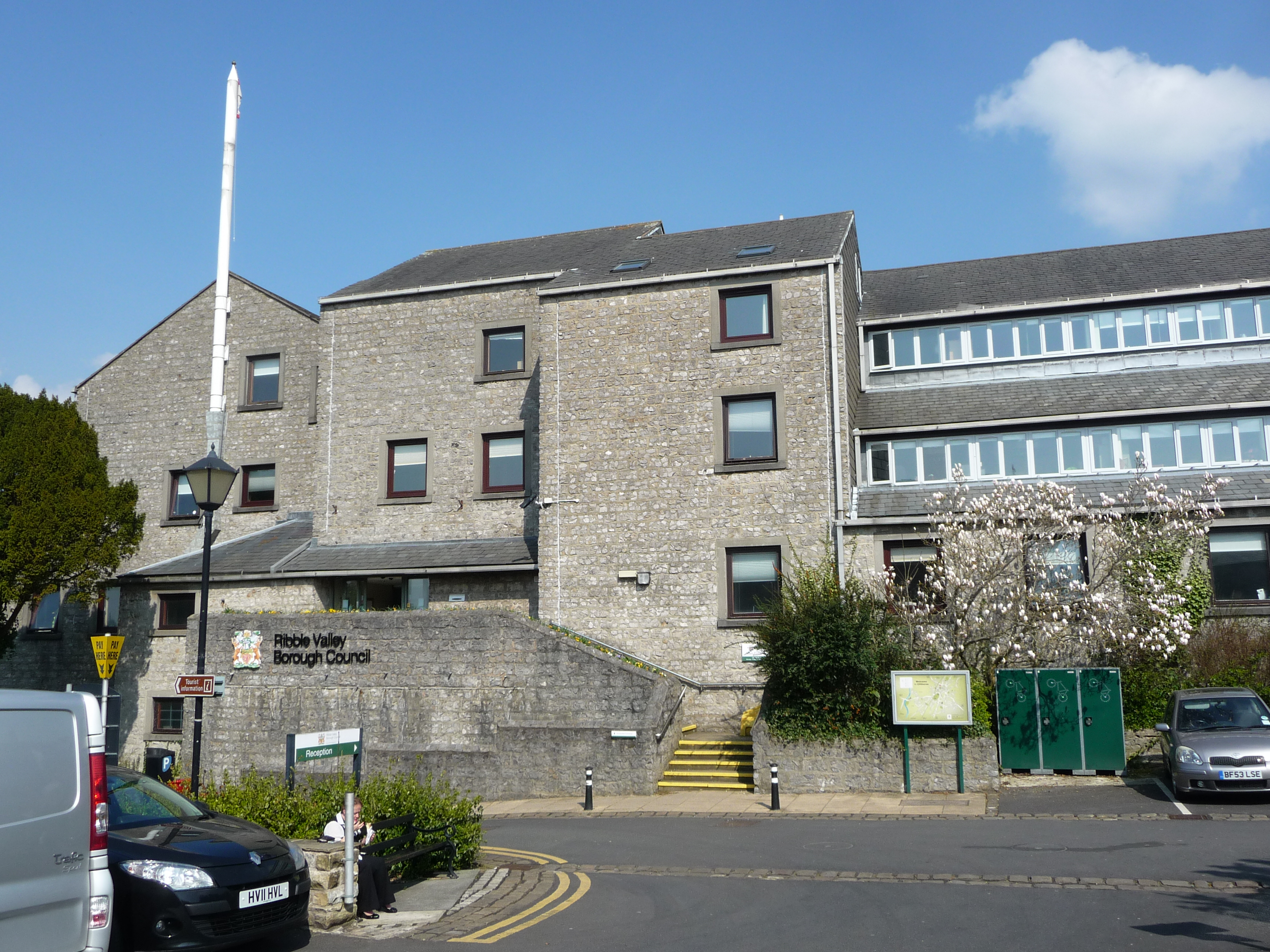
- Council Offices, Church Walk, Clitheroe, BB7 2RA

Website
- www.ribblevalley.gov.uk

Ribble Valley Borough Council provides district-level services. County-level services are provided by Lancashire County Council. The whole borough is covered by civil parishes, which form a third tier of local government.

=== Political control ===
The council has been under no overall control since the 2023 election, being led by a Conservative minority administration.

The first election to the council was held in 1973, initially operating as a shadow authority alongside the outgoing authorities before coming into its powers on 1 April 1974. Political control of the council since 1974 has been as follows:

Party in control	Years
Conservative	1974–1995
No overall control	1995–2003
Conservative	2003–2023
No overall control	2023–present

=== Leadership ===
The role of mayor is largely ceremonial in Ribble Valley. Political leadership is instead provided by the leader of the council. The leaders since 1999 have been:

Councillor	Party	From	To
Peter Redpath	Conservative	1999	2002
Chris Holtom	Conservative	2002	May 2004
John Hill	Conservative	May 2004	May 2007
Michael Ranson	Conservative	2007	2013
Stuart Hirst	Conservative	2013	2017
Ken Hind	Conservative	9 May 2017	20 Dec 2018
Stephen Atkinson	Conservative	15 Jan 2019	Mar 2025
Simon Hore	Conservative	13 May 2025	

=== Composition ===
Following the 2023 election, and subsequent changes of allegiance and by-elections up to April 2026, the composition of the council was:

Party	Seats
Conservative	16
Liberal Democrats	6
Labour	5
Reform	4
Green	2
Independent	7
Total	40

Two of the independent councillors (both former Liberal Democrats) are members of the 'Green & Progressive Liberal Group' along with the two Green Party Councillors.

=== Elections ===
Since the last boundary changes in 2019 the council has comprised 40 councillors representing 26 wards, with each ward electing one or two councillors. Elections are held every four years.

=== Premises ===
The council is based at the Council Offices on Church Walk in Clitheroe, which was purpose-built for the council in 1980. The council chamber is in an adjoining building at 13 Church Street, which had been offices of the old Clitheroe Borough Council prior to the 1974 reforms.

== Education ==
=== State-funded schools ===
==== Primary ====
See List of schools in Lancashire § Ribble Valley

==== Secondary ====
- Bowland High School, Grindleton
- Clitheroe Royal Grammar School
- Longridge High School
- Ribblesdale High School, Clitheroe
- St Augustine's RC High School, Billington
- St Cecilia's RC High School, Longridge

==== Specialist ====
- Hillside Specialist School, Longridge

=== Independent schools ===
- Stonyhurst Saint Mary's Hall, Hurst Green (preparatory)
- Moorland School, Clitheroe
- Oakhill School, Whalley
- Stonyhurst College, Hurst Green

=== Adult education ===
- Alston Hall, Longridge

== Sport ==
- Clitheroe FC

Longridge Town FC

== Local radio ==
=== Community radio ===
Ribble Valley Radio was a community radio station based in Clitheroe, part of the new, third sector of local radio licensed by OFCOM. The project was launched in September 2004. The radio station helped six local residents into paid work within the radio sector in just three years and trained more than 100 volunteers to present and produce their own radio shows. The project was not supported by the Borough Council, which caused controversy in the area, and local newspaper theClitheroe Advertiser and Times' held a poll which returned the result that 94% agreed that the Ribble Valley Borough Council were wrong not to fund the project and assist its long-term success. Many letters appeared in support of the project and damning the "short sighted" decision of the council. The whole episode brought excellent publicity and boosted the radio station's listening figures by 400%.

MP Nigel Evans was a staunch supporter and tabled an Early Day Motion at Parliament EDM 979 calling for "better resources and funding" for Ribble Valley Radio and the new and emerging sector. None of this was sufficient to save the station and on 14 October 2007 Ribble Valley Radio closed, because it was unable to gain sufficient funding to apply for a licence.

A new group, known as Ribble FM, was formed in 2011 with the aim of applying for a community radio licence in the third round of licensing by Ofcom. Ribble FM was set up by The Bee founder Roy Martin and includes local directors and trustees. The station has been on air since 2016 and has just been granted, as of March 2026, a third 5 year license to operate from Ofcom.

== Settlements ==
Towns, villages and hills in the Borough of Ribble Valley Forest of Bowland AONB

=== Civil parishes ===
Ribble Valley parishes

The whole borough is covered by civil parishes. The parish councils for Clitheroe and Longridge have declared their parishes to be towns, allowing them to take the style "town council".

1. Aighton, Bailey and Chaigley
2. Balderstone
3. Bashall Eaves
4. Billington and Langho
5. Bolton-by-Bowland
6. Bowland Forest High
7. Bowland Forest Low
8. Bowland-with-Leagram
9. Chatburn
10. Chipping
11. Clayton-le-Dale
12. Clitheroe
13. Dinckley
14. Downham
15. Dutton
16. Easington
17. Gisburn
18. Gisburn Forest
19. Great Mitton
20. Grindleton
21. Horton
22. Hothersall
23. Little Mitton
24. Longridge
25. Mearley
26. Mellor
27. Middop
28. Newsholme
29. Newton
30. Osbaldeston
31. Paythorne
32. Pendleton
33. Ramsgreave
34. Read
35. Ribchester
36. Rimington
37. Sabden
38. Salesbury
39. Sawley
40. Simonstone
41. Slaidburn
42. Thornley-with-Wheatley
43. Twiston
44. Waddington
45. West Bradford
46. Whalley
47. Wilpshire
48. Wiswell
49. Worston

== Economy ==
Although Ribble Valley is the largest area of Lancashire, it also has the smallest population. The economy of Ribble Valley is mainly rural in nature, with a high proportion of jobs being in the private sector, due to BAE there is a bigger sway towards manufacturing jobs and less of a service economy when compared to the rest of Lancashire presumably due to the size of the authority and the dispersed nature of settlements. The authority also has the highest proportion of remote workers in Lancashire.

=== Notable businesses ===
- BAE Systems and Spirit AeroSystems at Samlesbury Aerodrome

== Freedom of the Borough ==
The following people and military units have received the Freedom of the Borough of Ribble Valley.

=== Military Units ===
- The 14th/20th King's Hussars: 24 August 1992.
- The King's Royal Hussars: 2 December 1992.
- The Duke of Lancaster's Regiment: 10 March 2011.
