= Skelmersdale and Holland =

Former local government area in the UK

Coordinates: 53.546°N 2.752°W

Skelmersdale and UpHolland was an urban district in Lancashire, England, from 1968 to 1974. It was created by the merger of Skelmersdale and Upholland urban districts. In 1974 it was itself merged into the new non-metropolitan district of West Lancashire, under the Local Government Act 1972.
