= Wigan Rural District =

Former local government area in the UK

Coordinates: 53°36′N 2°38′W

- Area
  - 1911: 11,695 acres (47.33 km^{2})
  - 1961: 11,695 acres (47.33 km^{2})
- Population
  - 1901: 6,045
  - 1971: 14,862
- History
  - Origin: Sanitary district
  - Created: 1894
  - Abolished: 1974
  - Succeeded by: Metropolitan Borough of Wigan, West Lancashire
- Status: Rural district
  - HQ: Wigan

Wigan Rural District was an administrative district in Lancashire, England from 1894 to 1974. The rural district comprised an area to the north, but did not include the town of Wigan.

The district was created by the Local Government Act 1894 as the successor to the Wigan Rural Sanitary District. It consisted of six civil parishes: Dalton, Haigh, Parbold, Shevington, Worthington and Wrightington. The contiguous parishes of Haigh and Worthington were separated from the rest of the district by Standish with Langtree Urban District.

The rural district was abolished by the Local Government Act 1972 in 1974. Its territory was split between the Metropolitan Borough of Wigan in Greater Manchester, and the district of West Lancashire, with the parishes of Haigh, Shevington, and Worthington going to Wigan, and the remainder going to West Lancashire district.
