= Rural district =

Former type of local government area in England, Wales, and Ireland

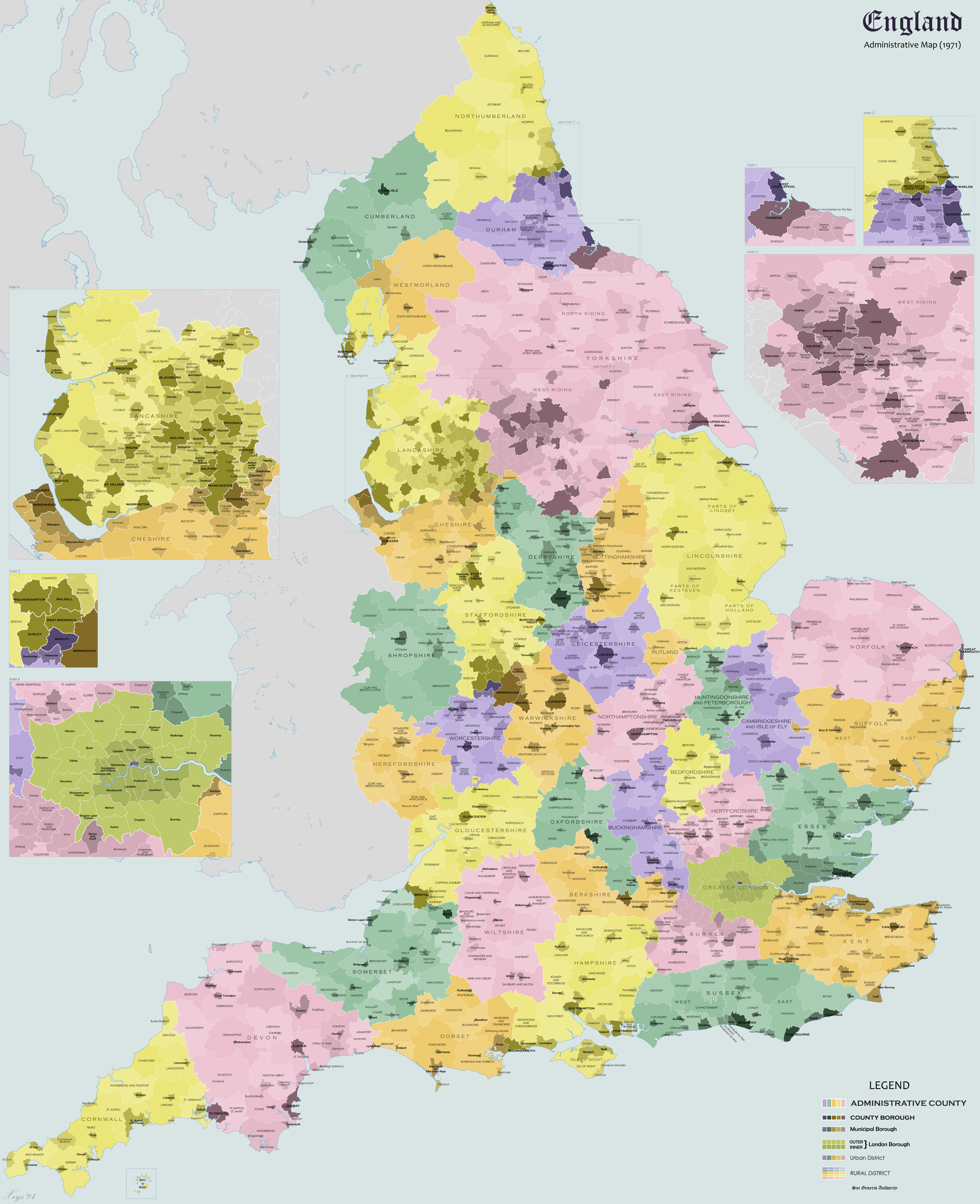
- Map of Rural Districts of England in 1971 (named in italic capitals), alongside Administrative Counties, County Boroughs, Municipal Boroughs, Urban Districts
- Category: Local government district
- Location: England and Wales and Ireland
- Found in: Administrative county
- Created by: Local Government Act 1894; Local Government (Ireland) Act 1898
- Created: (England) (Wales) 1894; (Ireland) 1899
- Abolished by: Local Government Act 1925; Local Government (Boundaries) Act (Northern Ireland) 1971; Local Government Act 1972
- Abolished: (Republic of Ireland) 1925/1930; (Northern Ireland) 1973; (England) (Wales) 1974
- Government: Rural district council
- Subdivisions: Civil parish: England / Ireland; District electoral division

A rural district was a type of local government area – now superseded – established at the end of the 19th century in England, Wales, and Ireland for the administration of predominantly rural areas at a level lower than that of the administrative counties.

== England and Wales ==
In England and Wales rural districts were created in 1894 by the Local Government Act 1894 (56 & 57 Vict. c. 73) along with urban districts. They replaced the earlier system of sanitary districts (themselves based on poor law unions, but not replacing them).

Each rural district had an elected rural district council (RDC), which inherited the functions of the earlier sanitary districts, but also had wider authority over matters such as local planning, council housing, and playgrounds and cemeteries. Matters such as education and major roads were the responsibility of county councils.

Until 1930 the rural district councillors were also poor law guardians for the unions of which they formed part. Each parish was represented by one or more councillors.

Originally there were 787 rural districts in England and Wales, as they were based directly upon the sanitary districts and poor law unions which had preceded them. Gradual urbanisation over the following decades led to some rural districts being redefined as urban districts or merging with existing urban districts or boroughs. Other rural districts proved to be too small or poor to be viable, and under the Local Government Act 1929, 236 rural districts were abolished and merged or amalgamated into larger units. Further mergers took place over following decades and by 1965 the number of districts had been reduced to 473.

The typical shape of a rural district was a doughnut-shaped ring around a town (which would be either an urban district or a municipal borough). A good example of this is Melton and Belvoir Rural District, which surrounded the town of Melton Mowbray. Some rural districts were fragmented, consisting of a number of detached parts, such as Wigan Rural District. Some rural districts had a more rounded shape and had a small town or village as the administrative centre.

A few rural districts consisted of only one parish (for example, Tintwistle Rural District, Alston with Garrigill Rural District, South Mimms Rural District, King's Lynn Rural District, Disley Rural District and Crowland Rural District). In such districts there was no separate parish council, and the rural district council exercised its functions.

All rural districts in England and Wales were abolished in 1974 (by the Local Government Act 1972) and were typically merged with nearby urban districts or boroughs to form "districts", which included both urban and rural areas.

See Rural districts formed in England and Wales 1894–1974 for the districts created in 1894; List of rural and urban districts in England, and List of rural and urban districts in Wales for a list of rural districts at abolition in 1974.

== Ireland ==
Rural districts were created in Ireland in 1899 under the Local Government (Ireland) Act 1898. They were subdivided into district electoral divisions.

In 1921, Ireland was partitioned with Northern Ireland remaining within the United Kingdom, and the rest of the country leaving as the Irish Free State in 1922. In the Irish Free State, rural districts outside of County Dublin were abolished in 1925 under the Local Government Act 1925 amid widespread accusations of corruption. Their functions were transferred to the county councils The remaining rural districts in County Dublin were similarly abolished in 1930 by the Local Government (Dublin) Act 1930. The former boundaries of the rural districts in the Republic of Ireland continue to be used for statistical purposes and defining constituencies.

In Northern Ireland, rural districts continued to exist until 1973 when they were abolished (along with all other local government of the old pattern) and replaced with a system of unitary districts.

== Newfoundland ==
Rural districts also existed in the Canadian province of Newfoundland to govern certain rural communities. Under Newfoundland's Local Government Act, rural districts and towns together formed the province's municipalities. Under the Municipalities Act, effective April 1, 1980, rural districts where abolished and automatically turned into towns.

== See also ==
- List of rural and urban districts in England in 1973
