= Unparished area =

Administrative territorial entity of England

In England, an unparished area is an area that is not covered by a civil parish (the lowest level of local government, not to be confused with an ecclesiastical parish). Most urbanised districts of England are either entirely or partly unparished. Many towns and some cities in otherwise rural districts are also unparished areas and therefore no longer have a town council or city council, and are instead directly managed by a higher local authority such as a district or county council.

Until the mid-nineteenth century there had been many areas that did not belong to any parish, known as extra-parochial areas. Acts of Parliament between 1858 and 1868 sought to abolish such areas, converting them into parishes or absorbing them into neighbouring parishes. After 1868 there were very few extra-parochial areas left; those remaining were mostly islands, such as Lundy, which did not have a neighbouring parish into which they could be absorbed.

Modern unparished areas (also termed "non-civil parish areas"), were created in 1965 in London and in 1974 elsewhere. They generally arose where former urban districts, municipal boroughs or county boroughs were abolished and where no successor parish was established. Parishes were not allowed in Greater London until the passing of the Local Government and Public Involvement in Health Act 2007 (which allows their formation in the London boroughs) and it remained entirely unparished from 1965 until Queen's Park was created in 2014.

Some cities and towns which are unparished areas in larger districts (i.e. not districts of themselves) have charter trustees to maintain a historic charter, such as city status (an example being in Bath) or simply the mayoralty of a town.

== List of unparished areas ==
Local authorities which are entirely parished are not listed. The ceremonial counties of Cornwall (apart from Wolf Rock), Dorset, Herefordshire, Isle of Wight, Northamptonshire, Northumberland, Rutland, Shropshire, and Wiltshire are entirely parished.

Ceremonial county	Local authority	Unparished area	Charter trustees	Notes
Bedfordshire	Bedford	Bedford	No	Part of modern borough which was pre-1974 Bedford Municipal Borough, less parish of Brickhill (created 2004).
Bedfordshire	Luton	Luton	No	Whole borough.
Berkshire	Reading	Reading	No	Whole borough.
Berkshire	Slough	Slough	No	Whole borough except parishes of Britwell, Colnbrook with Poyle, and Wexham Court. Unparished area equivalent to pre-1974 Slough Municipal Borough.
Berkshire	Windsor and Maidenhead	Maidenhead	No	Pre-1974 Maidenhead Municipal Borough.
Berkshire	Windsor and Maidenhead	Windsor	No	Pre-1974 New Windsor Municipal Borough.
Bristol	Bristol	Bristol	No	Whole city.
Buckinghamshire	Buckinghamshire	High Wycombe	Yes	Pre-1974 High Wycombe Municipal Borough.
Cambridgeshire	Cambridge	Cambridge	No	Whole city.
Cambridgeshire	Peterborough	Peterborough, Stanground North, Old Fletton	No	Part of modern city which covers the combined former areas of: Old Fletton Urban District (abolished 1974), less parish of Hampton Hargate and Vale (created 2010).; Peterborough Municipal Borough (abolished 1974), less parish of Bretton (created 1994).; Stanground North Civil Parish (abolished 2004).
Cheshire	Cheshire West and Chester	Chester	Yes	Part which was pre-1974 Chester County Borough.
Cheshire	Cheshire West and Chester	Burton, Ellesmere Port and Willaston	Yes	Combined pre-1974 areas of: Ellesmere Port Municipal Borough, less parish of Ince (created 1987).; Neston Urban District, less parish of Neston (created 2009). Remaining unparished area from Neston Urban District covers the Burton and Willaston area.
Cheshire	Halton	Runcorn and Widnes	No	Combined pre-1974 areas of: Runcorn Urban District, less parish of Sandymoor (created 2008).; Widnes Municipal Borough, less parish of Halebank (created 2008).
Cheshire	Warrington	Warrington	No	Part of modern borough which was pre-1974 Warrington County Borough.
Cumbria	Cumberland	Carlisle	Yes	Part of district which was pre-1974 Carlisle County Borough.
Derbyshire	Amber Valley	Riddings	No	Remaining unparished part of pre-1974 Alfreton Urban District following creation of parishes of Alfreton, Somercotes, and Swanwick in 1984.
Derbyshire	Chesterfield	Chesterfield	No	Part of modern borough which was pre-1974 Chesterfield Municipal Borough.
Derbyshire	Derby	Derby	No	Whole city.
Derbyshire	Erewash	Ilkeston	No	Pre-1974 Ilkeston Municipal Borough.
Derbyshire	Erewash	Long Eaton	No	Pre-1974 Long Eaton Urban District, less parish of Sawley (created 1999).
Derbyshire	High Peak	Buxton	No	Pre-1974 Buxton Municipal Borough.
Derbyshire	High Peak	Glossop	No	Pre-1974 Glossop Municipal Borough.
Derbyshire	South Derbyshire	Swadlincote	No	Pre-1974 Swadlincote Urban District.
Devon	Exeter	Exeter	No	Whole city.
Devon	Plymouth	Plymouth	No	Whole city.
Devon	Torbay	Torquay, Paignton, and Churston Ferrers	No	Modern borough less parish of Brixham (created 2007). Unparished area similar in extent to combined areas of the following authorities abolished in 1968 to create County Borough of Torbay: Torquay Municipal Borough.; Paignton Urban District.; Churston Ferrers Civil Parish (main part).
Devon	Torridge	Lundy	No	Ancient extra-parochial area. The Poor Law Amendment Act 1868 abolished most remaining extra-parochial areas by merging them into the neighbouring parish with the longest common boundary. Lundy avoided being added to a parish by virtue of being an island.
Durham	Darlington	Darlington	No	Part of modern borough which was pre-1974 Darlington County Borough.
Durham	County Durham	Chester-le-Street	No	Pre-1974 Chester-le-Street Urban District.
Durham	County Durham	Consett, Burnopfield and Dipton area	No	Combined pre-1974 areas of: Consett Urban District.; Stanley Urban District, less parish of Stanley (created 2008).
Durham	County Durham	Crook, Coundon and St Helen Auckland area	No	Combined pre-1974 areas of: Crook and Willington Urban District, less the parishes of Witton-le-Wear (created 1999) and Greater Willington (created 2007).; Bishop Auckland Urban District, less the parishes of Dene Valley (created 1999), West Auckland (created 2003), and Bishop Auckland (created 2007). A separate unparished area from the former Bishop Auckland Urban District at South Church does not adjoin this area.
Durham	County Durham	Durham: Old Durham / Sherburn Road area	Yes (Note: Charter trustees cover the pre-2009 Durham City Council area, which is partly parished and partly unparished)	One of four separate parts of pre-1974 Durham Municipal Borough which remain unparished following creation of City of Durham parish in 2018. The parish is defined by reference to electoral divisions rather than the unparished area; this residual unparished area being the part of the former unparished area of the city of Durham which lies in the Belmont electoral division.
Durham	County Durham	Durham: Dryburn Park area	Yes	One of four separate parts of pre-1974 Durham Municipal Borough which remain unparished following creation of City of Durham parish in 2018. The parish is defined by reference to electoral divisions rather than the unparished area; this residual unparished area being one of three separate parts of the former unparished area of the city of Durham which lies in the Framwellgate and Newton Hall electoral division.
Durham	County Durham	Durham: Dunholme Close area	Yes	One of four separate parts of pre-1974 Durham Municipal Borough which remain unparished following creation of City of Durham parish in 2018. The parish is defined by reference to electoral divisions rather than the unparished area; this residual unparished area being one of three separate parts of the former unparished area of the city of Durham which lies in the Framwellgate and Newton Hall electoral division.
Durham	County Durham	Durham: Newton Hall area	Yes	One of four separate parts of pre-1974 Durham Municipal Borough which remain unparished following creation of City of Durham parish in 2018. The parish is defined by reference to electoral divisions rather than the unparished area; this residual unparished area being one of three separate parts of the former unparished area of the city of Durham which lies in the Framwellgate and Newton Hall electoral division.
Durham	County Durham	South Church area	No	Part of the pre-1974 Bishop Auckland Urban District which remains unparished following the creation of parishes of Dene Valley, West Auckland (created 2003) and Bishop Auckland (created 2007). A larger separate unparished area from the former Bishop Auckland Urban District around Coundon and St Helen Auckland does not adjoin this area.
Durham	Hartlepool	Hartlepool	No	Part of modern borough which was pre-1974 Hartlepool County Borough, less parish of Headland (created 1999).
Durham	Stockton-on-Tees	Stockton-on-Tees	No	Part of modern borough which was pre-1968 Stockton-on-Tees Municipal Borough, which was included in Teesside County Borough 1968–1974.
Essex	Basildon	Basildon	No	Part of modern borough which was pre-1974 Basildon Urban District, less parishes of Billericay, Great Burstead and South Green, Little Burstead, Ramsden Bellhouse, and Ramsden Crays (all created 1996), Noak Bridge (created 2002), Shotgate (created 2007), Bowers Gifford and North Benfleet (created 2010), and Wickford (created 2022).
Essex	Braintree	Braintree and Bocking	No	Part of modern district which was pre-1974 Braintree and Bocking Urban District.
Essex	Brentwood	Brentwood	No	Pre-1974 borough except parishes of Herongate and Ingrave (created 2002), and West Horndon (created 2002).
Essex	Castle Point	Benfleet	No	Whole borough less parish of Canvey Island (created 2007). Unparished area equivalent to pre-1974 Benfleet Urban District.
Essex	Chelmsford	Chelmsford	No	Part of modern city which was pre-1974 Chelmsford Municipal Borough less parishes of Chelmer and Chelmsford Garden (created in 2023).
Essex	Colchester	Colchester	No	Part of modern borough which was pre-1974 Colchester Municipal Borough, less parish of Myland (created 1999) but including part of East Donyland added in 2004.
Essex	Harlow	Harlow	No	Whole district.
Essex	Southend-on-Sea	Southend-on-Sea	No	Whole city except parish of Leigh-on-Sea (created 1995).
Essex	Tendring	Clacton	No	Pre-1974 Clacton Urban District.
Essex	Thurrock	Thurrock	No	Whole borough, being pre-1974 Thurrock Urban District less small part in Basildon New Town. Thurrock Urban District had been created in 1936 as merger of Grays Thurrock Urban District, Purfleet Urban District, Tilbury Urban District, and most of the Orsett Rural District.
Gloucestershire	Cheltenham	Cheltenham	No	Part of modern borough which was pre-1974 Cheltenham Municipal Borough.
Gloucestershire	Gloucester	Gloucester	No	Whole city except parish of Quedgeley, transferred into Gloucester in 1991. Unparished area equivalent to pre-1974 Gloucester County Borough.
Hampshire	Basingstoke and Deane	Basingstoke	No	Part of modern borough which was pre-1974 Basingstoke Municipal Borough.
Hampshire	Fareham	Fareham	No	Whole borough.
Hampshire	Gosport	Gosport	No	Whole borough.
Hampshire	Havant	Havant and Waterloo	No	Whole borough (former Havant and Waterloo Urban District).
Hampshire	Portsmouth	Portsmouth	No	Whole city. (A Southsea parish was created from part of the area in 1999 but abolished in 2010.)
Hampshire	Rushmoor	Aldershot and Farnborough	No	Whole borough, being combined pre-1974 areas of: Aldershot Municipal Borough.; Farnborough Urban District.
Hampshire	Southampton	Southampton	No	Whole city.
Hampshire	Winchester	Winchester	No	Part of modern city which was pre-1974 Winchester Municipal Borough, less parish of Badger Farm (created 1985).
Hertfordshire	Broxbourne	Cheshunt and Hoddesdon	No	Whole borough, being combined pre-1974 areas of: Cheshunt Urban District.; Hoddesdon Urban District.
Hertfordshire	Dacorum	Hemel Hempstead	No	Pre-1974 Hemel Hempstead Municipal Borough.
Hertfordshire	Hertsmere	Bushey	No	Pre-1974 Bushey Urban District.
Hertfordshire	Hertsmere	Potters Bar	No	Pre-1974 Potters Bar Urban District, less parish of South Mimms (created 2008).
Hertfordshire	North Hertfordshire	Baldock, Hitchin, and Letchworth	No	Combined pre-1974 areas of: Baldock Urban District.; Hitchin Urban District.; Letchworth Urban District. (A Letchworth Garden City parish covering the area was created in 2005 but abolished 2013.)
Hertfordshire	St Albans	St Albans	No	Part of modern city and district which was pre-1974 St Albans Municipal Borough.
Hertfordshire	Stevenage	Stevenage	No	Whole borough.
Hertfordshire	Three Rivers	Maple Cross and Mill End, Rickmansworth area	No	One of two separate parts of pre-1974 Rickmansworth Urban District which remain unparished following creation of parishes of Croxley Green in 1986 and Batchworth in 2017. Batchworth parish was defined by reference to wards rather than the unparished area. This unparished area represents the part of the former Rickmansworth Urban District within the Chorleywood South and Maple Cross ward.
Hertfordshire	Three Rivers	Loudwater: Chess Hill / Loudwater Lane area	No	One of two separate parts of pre-1974 Rickmansworth Urban District which remain unparished following creation of parishes of Croxley Green in 1986 and Batchworth in 2017. Batchworth parish was defined by reference to wards rather than the unparished area. This unparished area represents the part of the former Rickmansworth Urban District within the Chorleywood North and Sarratt ward.
Hertfordshire	Watford	Watford	No	Whole borough.
Hertfordshire	Welwyn Hatfield	Welwyn Garden City	No	Pre-1974 Welwyn Garden City Urban District.
Kent	Ashford	Ashford	No	Part of modern borough which was pre-1974 Ashford Urban District, less parishes of Kennington and South Willesborough and Newtown, both created 2019.
Kent	Canterbury	Canterbury	No	Part of modern city which was pre-1974 Canterbury County Borough.
Kent	Canterbury	Herne Bay and Whitstable	No	Combined pre-1974 areas of: Herne Bay Urban District, less parish of Herne and Broomfield (created 1996).; Whitstable Urban District, less parish of Chestfield (created 1988).
Kent	Dartford	Dartford	No	Part of modern borough which was pre-1974 Dartford Municipal Borough.
Kent	Dartford	Ebbsfleet	No	Area removed from parish of Swanscombe and Greenhithe to become an unparished area in 2019.
Kent	Gravesham	Gravesend and Northfleet	No	Combined pre-1974 areas of: Gravesend Municipal Borough.; Northfleet Urban District.
Kent	Maidstone	Maidstone	No	Part of modern borough which was pre-1974 Maidstone Municipal Borough, less parish of Tovil and part added to new parish of Downswood (both created 1987).
Kent	Medway	Chatham, Gillingham, and Rochester	No	Combined pre-1974 areas of: Chatham Municipal Borough.; Gillingham Municipal Borough.; Rochester Municipal Borough.
Kent	Swale	Halfway Houses	No	Only part of pre-1974 Queenborough-in-Sheppey Municipal Borough left unparished following creation of parishes of Eastchurch, Leysdown, Queenborough, and Warden (all created 1983), Minster-on-Sea (2003), and Sheerness (2019).
Kent	Swale	Sittingbourne and Milton	No	Pre-1974 Sittingbourne and Milton Urban District.
Kent	Thanet	Margate	Yes	Pre-1974 Margate Municipal Borough, less parishes of Birchington and Westgate-on-Sea (created 2015).
Kent	Tonbridge and Malling	Tonbridge	No	Part of modern district which was pre-1974 Tonbridge Urban District.
Kent	Tunbridge Wells	Royal Tunbridge Wells	No	Part of modern borough which was pre-1974 Royal Tunbridge Wells Municipal Borough.
Lancashire	Blackburn with Darwen	Blackburn	No	Part of modern borough which was pre-1974 Blackburn County Borough.
Lancashire	Blackburn with Darwen	Hoddlesden	No	Remaining part of pre-1974 Darwen Municipal Borough left unparished following creation of Darwen parish in 2009.
Lancashire	Blackpool	Blackpool	No	Whole borough.
Lancashire	Burnley	Burnley	No	Part of modern borough which was pre-1974 Burnley County Borough.
Lancashire	Chorley	Chorley	No	Part of modern borough which was pre-1974 Chorley Municipal Borough, less parish of Astley Village (created 1991).
Lancashire	Hyndburn	Accrington, Church, Clayton-le-Moors, Great Harwood, Oswaldtwistle and Rishton	No	Whole borough except parish of Altham. Unparished area equivalent to combined pre-1974 areas of: Accrington Municipal Borough.; Church Urban District.; Clayton-le-Moors Urban District.; Great Harwood Urban District.; Oswaldtwistle Urban District.; Rishton Urban District.
Lancashire	Lancaster	Heysham	No	Remaining part of pre-1974 Morecambe and Heysham Municipal Borough left unparished following creation of parish of Morecambe in 2009. Similar in area to pre-1928 Heysham Urban District.
Lancashire	Lancaster	Lancaster	No	Part of modern city which was pre-1974 Lancaster Municipal Borough, less parish of Aldcliffe-with-Stodday (created 2017).
Lancashire	Preston	Preston and Fulwood	No	Part of modern city which covers the combined pre-1974 areas of: Fulwood Urban District.; Preston County Borough.; Less parts from both included in parish of Ingol and Tanterton (created 2012).
Lancashire	Rossendale	Bacup, Haslingden, Rawtenstall and Edenfield area	No	Whole borough except parish of Whitworth. Unparished area equivalent to combined pre-1974 areas of: Bacup Municipal Borough.; Haslingden Municipal Borough.; Rawtenstall Municipal Borough.; Edenfield part of Ramsbottom Urban District (rest went to Bury).
Lancashire	South Ribble	Leyland	No	Pre-1974 Leyland Urban District.
Lancashire	South Ribble	Walton-le-Dale	No	Pre-1974 Walton-le-Dale Urban District.
Lancashire	West Lancashire	Ormskirk	No	Pre-1974 Ormskirk Urban District, less parishes of Burscough, Lathom, and Newburgh (all created 1983), and Lathom South (created 2007).
Lancashire	West Lancashire	Skelmersdale	No	Remaining part of pre-1974 Skelmersdale and Holland Urban District left unparished following creation of parish of Up Holland in 2005.
Lancashire	Wyre	Poulton-le-Fylde and Thornton-Cleveleys	No	Combined pre-1974 areas of: Poulton-le-Fylde Urban District.; Thornton-Cleveleys Urban District.
Leicestershire	Charnwood	Loughborough	No	Pre-1974 Loughborough Municipal Borough, less part included in parish of Stonebow Village (created 2019).
Leicestershire	Harborough	Market Harborough	No	Pre-1974 Market Harborough Urban District plus part of Lubenham added in 2021.
Leicestershire	Hinckley and Bosworth	Hinckley	No	Pre-1974 Hinckley Urban District, less parishes of Burbage and Stoke Golding (both created 1986), Earl Shilton (created 1995), and Barwell (created 2007).
Leicestershire	Leicester	Leicester	No	Whole city.
Leicestershire	Melton	Melton Mowbray	No	Pre-1974 Melton Mowbray Urban District.
Leicestershire	North West Leicestershire	Coalville	No	One of two separate areas of pre-1974 Coalville Urban District which remain unparished following creation of parishes of Ellistown and Battleflat (created 2002), Hugglescote and Donington le Heath (created 2011), and Whitwick (created 2011).
Leicestershire	North West Leicestershire	Thringstone	No	One of two separate aras of pre-1974 Coalville Urban District which remain unparished following creation of parishes of Ellistown and Battleflat (created 2002), Hugglescote and Donington le Heath (created 2011), and Whitwick (created 2011).
Leicestershire	Oadby and Wigston	Oadby and Wigston	No	Whole borough, being combined pre-1974 areas of: Oadby Urban District.; Wigston Urban District.
Lincolnshire	Boston	Boston	No	Part of modern borough which was pre-1974 Boston Municipal Borough.
Lincolnshire	Lincoln	Lincoln	No	Whole city.
Lincolnshire	North East Lincolnshire	Cleethorpes	Yes	Pre-1974 Cleethorpes Municipal Borough. Contiguous with unparished area of Grimsby, but maintains separate charter trustees.
Lincolnshire	North East Lincolnshire	Grimsby	Yes	Pre-1974 Grimsby County Borough, less parish of Great Coates (created 2003). Contiguous with unparished area of Cleethorpes, but maintains separate charter trustees.
Lincolnshire	North Lincolnshire	Scunthorpe	Yes	Pre-1974 Scunthorpe Municipal Borough.
Lincolnshire	South Holland	Spalding	No	Pre-1974 Spalding Urban District.
City of London	City of London	City of London	No	Whole city.
Greater London	Barking and Dagenham	Barking and Dagenham	No	Whole London Borough, being combined pre-1965 areas of: Barking Municipal Borough (except small south-western part around Beckton which went to London Borough of Newham).; Dagenham Municipal Borough (except small northern part around Hog Hill which went to London Borough of Redbridge).
Greater London	Barnet	Barnet	No	Whole London Borough, being combined pre-1965 areas of: Barnet Urban District.; East Barnet Urban District.; Finchley Municipal Borough.; Friern Barnet Urban District.; Hendon Municipal Borough.
Greater London	Bexley	Bexley	No	Whole London Borough, being combined pre-1965 areas of: Bexley Municipal Borough.; Erith Municipal Borough.; Crayford Urban District.; Sidcup area from Chislehurst and Sidcup Urban District (Chislehurst area went to London Borough of Bromley).
Greater London	Brent	Brent	No	Whole London Borough, being combined pre-1965 areas of: Wembley Municipal Borough.; Willesden Municipal Borough.
Greater London	Bromley	Bromley	No	Whole London Borough, being combined pre-1965 areas of: Beckenham Municipal Borough.; Bromley Municipal Borough.; Orpington Urban District.; Penge Urban District.; Chislehurst area from Chislehurst and Sidcup Urban District (Sidcup area went to London Borough of Bexley).
Greater London	Camden	Camden	No	Whole London Borough, being combined pre-1965 areas of: Hampstead Metropolitan Borough.; Holborn Metropolitan Borough.; St Pancras Metropolitan Borough.
Greater London	Croydon	Croydon	No	Whole London Borough, being combined pre-1965 areas of: Croydon County Borough.; Coulsdon and Purley Urban District.
Greater London	Ealing	Ealing	No	Whole London Borough, being combined pre-1965 areas of: Acton Municipal Borough.; Ealing Municipal Borough.; Southall Municipal Borough.
Greater London	Enfield	Enfield	No	Whole London Borough, being combined pre-1965 areas of: Edmonton Municipal Borough.; Enfield Municipal Borough.; Southgate Municipal Borough.
Greater London	Greenwich	Greenwich	No	Whole London Borough, being combined pre-1965 areas of: Greenwich Metropolitan Borough.; Woolwich Metropolitan Borough (except small part north of River Thames around North Woolwich which went to London Borough of Newham).
Greater London	Hackney	Hackney	No	Whole London Borough, being combined pre-1965 areas of: Hackney Metropolitan Borough.; Shoreditch Metropolitan Borough.; Stoke Newington Metropolitan Borough.
Greater London	Hammersmith and Fulham	Hammersmith and Fulham	No	Whole London Borough, being combined pre-1965 areas of: Fulham Metropolitan Borough.; Hammersmith Metropolitan Borough.
Greater London	Haringey	Haringey	No	Whole London Borough, being combined pre-1965 areas of: Hornsey Municipal Borough.; Tottenham Municipal Borough.; Wood Green Municipal Borough.
Greater London	Harrow	Harrow	No	Whole London Borough, covering same area as pre-1965 Municipal Borough of Harrow.
Greater London	Havering	Havering	No	Whole London Borough, being combined pre-1965 areas of: Hornchurch Urban District.; Romford Municipal Borough.
Greater London	Hillingdon	Hillingdon	No	Whole London Borough, being combined pre-1965 areas of: Hayes and Harlington Urban District.; Ruislip-Northwood Urban District.; Uxbridge Municipal Borough.; Yiewsley and West Drayton Urban District.
Greater London	Hounslow	Hounslow	No	Whole London Borough, being combined pre-1965 areas of: Brentford and Chiswick Municipal Borough.; Feltham Urban District.; Heston and Isleworth Municipal Borough.
Greater London	Islington	Islington	No	Whole London Borough, being combined pre-1965 areas of: Finsbury Metropolitan Borough.; Islington Metropolitan Borough.
Greater London	Kensington and Chelsea	Kensington and Chelsea	No	Whole London Borough, being combined pre-1965 areas of: Chelsea Metropolitan Borough.; Kensington Metropolitan Borough.
Greater London	Kingston upon Thames	Kingston upon Thames	No	Whole London Borough, being combined pre-1965 areas of: Kingston-upon-Thames Municipal Borough.; Malden and Coombe Municipal Borough.; Surbiton Municipal Borough.
Greater London	Lambeth	Lambeth	No	Whole London Borough, being combined pre-1965 areas of: Lambeth Metropolitan Borough.; Clapham and Streatham area from Wandsworth Metropolitan Borough (majority of which went to London Borough of Wandsworth).
Greater London	Lewisham	Lewisham	No	Whole London Borough, being combined pre-1965 areas of: Deptford Metropolitan Borough.; Lewisham Metropolitan Borough.
Greater London	Merton	Merton	No	Whole London Borough, being combined pre-1965 areas of: Mitcham Municipal Borough.; Merton and Morden Urban District.; Wimbledon Municipal Borough.
Greater London	Newham	Newham	No	Whole London Borough, being combined pre-1965 areas of: East Ham County Borough.; West Ham County Borough.; Beckton area (part) from Barking Municipal Borough (majority of which went to London Borough of Barking and Dagenham).; North Woolwich area from Woolwich Municipal Borough (majority of which went to London Borough of Greenwich).
Greater London	Redbridge	Redbridge	No	Whole London Borough, being combined pre-1965 areas of: Ilford Municipal Borough.; Wanstead and Woodford Municipal Borough.; Hainault area (part) from Chigwell Urban District (majority of which remained in Essex).; Hog Hill area from Dagenham Municipal Borough (majority of which went to London Borough of Barking and Dagenham).
Greater London	Richmond upon Thames	Richmond upon Thames	No	Whole London Borough, being combined pre-1965 areas of: Barnes Municipal Borough.; Richmond Municipal Borough.; Twickenham Municipal Borough.
Greater London	Southwark	Southwark	No	Whole London Borough, being combined pre-1965 areas of: Bermondsey Metropolitan Borough.; Camberwell Metropolitan Borough.; Southwark Metropolitan Borough.
Greater London	Sutton	Sutton	No	Whole London Borough, being combined pre-1965 areas of: Beddington and Wallington Municipal Borough.; Carshalton Urban District.; Sutton and Cheam Municipal Borough.
Greater London	Tower Hamlets	Tower Hamlets	No	Whole London Borough, being combined pre-1965 areas of: Bethnal Green Metropolitan Borough.; Poplar Metropolitan Borough.; Stepney Metropolitan Borough.
Greater London	Waltham Forest	Waltham Forest	No	Whole London Borough, being combined pre-1965 areas of: Chingford Municipal Borough.; Leyton Municipal Borough.; Walthamstow Municipal Borough.
Greater London	Wandsworth	Wandsworth	No	Whole London Borough, being combined pre-1965 areas of: Battersea Metropolitan Borough.; Wandsworth Metropolitan Borough (except smaller eastern part around Clapham and Streatham which went to London Borough of Lambeth).
Greater London	Westminster	Westminster	No	Whole London Borough except parish of Queen's Park (created 2014). Unparished area equivalent to combined pre-1965 areas of: Marylebone Metropolitan Borough.; Paddington Metropolitan Borough, less parish of Queen's Park (created 2014).; Westminster Metropolitan Borough.
Greater Manchester	Bolton	Bolton, Farnworth, Hunger Hill, Kearsley, Little Lever, Over Hulton and South Turton	No	Whole metropolitan borough except parishes of Blackrod, Horwich, and Westhoughton. Unparished area equivalent to combined pre-1974 areas of: Bolton County Borough.; Farnworth Municipal Borough.; Kearsley Urban District.; Little Lever Urban District.; Southern part of Turton Urban District (northern part became parish of North Turton in Blackburn with Darwen).; Westhoughton Urban District, less parish of Westhoughton (created 1985).
Greater Manchester	Bury	Bury, Affetside, Prestwich, Radcliffe, Ramsbottom, Tottington and Whitefield	No	Whole metropolitan borough, being combined pre-1974 areas of: Bury County Borough.; Prestwich Municipal Borough.; Radcliffe Municipal Borough.; Ramsbottom Urban District, except northern part around Edenfield which went to Rossendale.; Tottington Urban District.; Whitefield Urban District.
Greater Manchester	Manchester	Manchester	No	Whole city except parish of Ringway, the unparished area being the pre-1974 Manchester County Borough.
Greater Manchester	Oldham	Oldham, Chadderton, Failsworth, Lees and Royton	No	Whole metropolitan borough except parishes of Saddleworth and Shaw and Crompton, the unparished area being combined pre-1974 areas of: Chadderton Urban District.; Failsworth Urban District.; Lees Urban District.; Oldham County Borough.; Royton Urban District.
Greater Manchester	Rochdale	Rochdale, Heywood, Littleborough, Middleton and Wardle	No	Whole metropolitan borough, being combined pre-1974 areas of: Heywood Municipal Borough.; Littleborough Urban District.; Middleton Municipal Borough.; Milnrow Urban District.; Rochdale County Borough.; Wardle Urban District.
Greater Manchester	Salford	Salford, Eccles, Irlam, Swinton and Pendlebury and Worsley	No	Whole city, being combined pre-1974 areas of: Eccles Municipal Borough.; Irlam Urban District.; Salford County Borough.; Swinton and Pendlebury Municipal Borough.; Worsley Urban District.
Greater Manchester	Stockport	Stockport, Bredbury and Romiley, Cheadle and Gatley, Hazel Grove and Bramhall and Marple	No	Whole metropolitan borough, being combined pre-1974 areas of: Bredbury and Romiley Urban District.; Cheadle and Gatley Urban District.; Hazel Grove and Bramhall Urban District.; Marple Urban District.; Stockport County Borough.
Greater Manchester	Tameside	Ashton-under-Lyne, Audenshaw, Denton, Droylsden, Dukinfield, Hyde, Longdendale and Stalybridge	No	Whole metropolitan borough except parish of Mossley (created 1999). Unparished area equivalent to combined pre-1974 areas of: Ashton-under-Lyne Municipal Borough.; Audenshaw Urban District.; Denton Urban District.; Droylsden Urban District.; Dukinfield Municipal Borough.; Hyde Municipal Borough.; Longdendale Urban District.; Stalybridge Municipal Borough.
Greater Manchester	Trafford	Altrincham, Bowdon, Hale, Sale, Stretford and Urmston	No	Whole metropolitan borough except parishes of Carrington, Dunham Massey, Partington, and Warburton. Unparished area equivalent to combined pre-1974 areas of: Altrincham Municipal Borough.; Bowdon Urban District.; Hale Urban District.; Sale Municipal Borough.; Stretford Municipal Borough.; Urmston Urban District.
Greater Manchester	Wigan	Wigan, Abram, Ashton-in-Makerfield, Aspull, Atherton, Billinge and Winstanley, Golborne, Hindley, Ince-in-Makerfield, Leigh, Orrell, Standish with Langtree and Tyldesley	No	Whole metropolitan borough except parishes of Haigh, Shevington, and Worthington. Unparished area equivalent to combined pre-1974 areas of: Abram Urban District.; Ashton-in-Makerfield Urban District (except part which became parish of Seneley Green and went to St Helens).; Aspull Urban District.; Atherton Urban District.; Golborne Urban District (except part which became parish of Culcheth and Glazebury and went to Warrington).; Hindley Urban District.; Ince-in-Makerfield Urban District.; Leigh Municipal Borough.; Orrell Urban District.; Standish-with-Langtree Urban District.; Tyldesley Urban District.; Wigan County Borough.; Winstanley and Higher End areas from Billinge and Winstanley Urban District (rest of which became parish of Billinge Chapel End and went to St Helens).
Merseyside	Knowsley	Huyton with Roby and Tarbock	No	Combined former areas of: Huyton with Roby Urban District (abolished 1974).; Tarbock Civil Parish (abolished 2014).
Merseyside	Knowsley	Kirkby	No	Pre-1974 Kirkby Urban District.
Merseyside	Liverpool	Liverpool	No	Whole city.
Merseyside	St Helens	St Helens, Haydock and Newton-le-Willows	No	Part of metropolitan borough covering combined pre-1974 areas of: Haydock Urban District.; Newton-le-Willows Urban District.; St Helens County Borough.
Merseyside	Sefton	Bootle, Crosby, and Litherland	No	Part of metropolitan borough covering combined pre-1974 areas of: Bootle County Borough.; Crosby Municipal Borough.; Litherland Urban District.
Merseyside	Sefton	Southport	No	Pre-1974 Southport County Borough.
Merseyside	Wirral	Wirral, Bebington, Birkenhead, Hoylake and Wallasey	No	Whole metropolitan borough, being combined pre-1974 areas of: Bebington Municipal Borough.; Birkenhead County Borough.; Hoylake Urban District.; Wirral Urban District.; Wallasey County Borough.
Norfolk	Great Yarmouth	Great Yarmouth	No	Part of modern borough which was pre-1974 Great Yarmouth County Borough.
Norfolk	Norwich	Norwich	No	Whole city.
Norfolk	King's Lynn and West Norfolk	King's Lynn	No	Part of modern borough which was pre-1974 King's Lynn Municipal Borough.
Nottinghamshire	Ashfield	Hucknall	No	Pre-1974 Hucknall Urban District.
Nottinghamshire	Ashfield	Kirkby-in-Ashfield and Sutton-in-Ashfield	No	Combined pre-1974 areas of: Kirkby in Ashfield Urban District.; Sutton in Ashfield Urban District.
Nottinghamshire	Bassetlaw	East Retford	Yes	Pre-1974 East Retford Municipal Borough.
Nottinghamshire	Bassetlaw	Worksop	Yes	Pre-1974 Worksop Municipal Borough, less parishes of Rhodesia and Shireoaks (both created 1984), and Clumber and Hardwick (created 1994).
Nottinghamshire	Broxtowe	Beeston	No	Pre-1974 Beeston and Stapleford Urban District, less parish of Stapleford (created 1987).
Nottinghamshire	Gedling	Arnold and Carlton	No	Part of borough covering combined pre-1974 areas of: Arnold Urban District; Carlton Urban District, less parish of Colwick (created 1980).
Nottinghamshire	Mansfield	Mansfield and Mansfield Woodhouse	Yes	Whole district except Warsop. Unparished area equivalent to combined pre-1974 areas of: Mansfield Municipal Borough.; Mansfield Woodhouse Urban District.
Nottinghamshire	Nottingham	Nottingham	No	Whole city.
Nottinghamshire	Rushcliffe	West Bridgford	No	Pre-1974 West Bridgford Urban District.
Oxfordshire	Oxford	Oxford	No	Whole city except four parishes of Blackbird Leys, Littlemore, Old Marston, and Risinghurst and Sandhills. Blackbird Leys was created in 1991 from part of pre-1974 Oxford County Borough, the other three parishes were transferred to Oxford from South Oxfordshire in 1991.
Somerset	Bath and North East Somerset	Bath	Yes	Part of modern district which was pre-1996 City of Bath (equivalent to pre-1974 Bath County Borough).
Staffordshire	Cannock Chase	Cannock	No	One of two areas from the pre-1974 Cannock Urban District remaining unparished following creation of parishes of Bridgtown, Cannock Wood, and Heath Hayes and Wimblebury (all created 1988), and Hednesford (created 2000). This unparished area covers the main part of the town of Cannock.
Staffordshire	Cannock Chase	Rawnsley area	No	One of two areas from the pre-1974 Cannock Urban District remaining unparished following creation of parishes of Bridgtown, Cannock Wood, and Heath Hayes and Wimblebury (all created 1988), and Hednesford (created 2000). This unparished area covers the area around Rawnsley, Hazelslade and Prospect Village.
Staffordshire	Newcastle-under-Lyme	Newcastle-under-Lyme	No	Part of modern borough which was pre-1974 Newcastle-under-Lyme Municipal Borough, less parish of Silverdale (created 2002).
Staffordshire	Stafford	Stafford	No	Part of modern borough which was pre-1974 Stafford Municipal Borough, less parish of Doxey (created 2005).
Staffordshire	Stoke-on-Trent	Stoke-on-Trent	No	Whole city.
Staffordshire	Tamworth	Tamworth	No	Whole borough.
Suffolk	Ipswich	Ipswich	No	Whole borough.
Surrey	Elmbridge	Esher and Walton and Weybridge	No	Whole borough, less parish of Claygate (created 2000). Unparished area equivalent to pre-1974 areas of: Esher Urban District, less the parish of Claygate (created 2000).; Walton and Weybridge Urban District.
Surrey	Epsom and Ewell	Epsom and Ewell	No	Whole borough, being pre-1974 Epsom and Ewell Municipal Borough.
Surrey	Guildford	Guildford	No	Part of modern borough which was pre-1974 Guildford Municipal Borough.
Surrey	Mole Valley	Dorking and Leatherhead	No	Part of district equivalent to combined pre-1974 areas of: Dorking Urban District, less parishes of Brockham and Mickleham (both created 1982).; Leatherhead Urban District.
Surrey	Reigate and Banstead	Reigate and Banstead	No	Whole borough except parishes of Horley and Salfords and Sidlow. Unparished area equivalent to pre-1974 areas of: Banstead Urban District.; Reigate Municipal Borough.
Surrey	Runnymede	Chertsey and Egham	No	Whole borough, being combined pre-1974 areas of: Chertsey Urban District.; Egham Urban District.
Surrey	Spelthorne	Staines-upon-Thames and Sunbury-on-Thames	No	Whole borough, being combined pre-1974 areas of: Staines Urban District.; Sunbury-on-Thames Urban District.
Surrey	Surrey Heath	Frimley and Camberley	No	Pre-1974 Frimley and Camberley Urban District.
Surrey	Woking	Woking	No	Whole borough.
East Sussex	Brighton and Hove	Brighton, Hove and Portslade by Sea	No	Whole city except parish of Rottingdean (created 1995). Unparished area split into two parts, east and west of Rottingdean. Larger western part covers combined pre-1974 areas of: Brighton County Borough, less parish of Rottindean (created 1995) and separate unparished area of Saltdean which lies east of Rottingdean.; Hove Municipal Borough.; Portslade-by-Sea Urban District.
East Sussex	Brighton and Hove	Saltdean	No	One of two separate areas of pre-1974 Brighton County Borough remaining unparished following creation of parish of Rottingdean in 1995.
East Sussex	Eastbourne	Eastbourne	No	Whole borough.
East Sussex	Hastings	Hastings	No	Whole borough.
West Sussex	Adur	Shoreham-by-Sea and Southwick	No	Combined pre-1974 areas of: Shoreham-by-Sea Urban District.; Southwick Urban District.
West Sussex	Crawley	Crawley	No	Whole borough.
West Sussex	Worthing	Worthing	No	Whole borough.
Tyne and Wear	Gateshead	Gateshead, Blaydon, Felling, Ryton and Whickham	No	Whole metropolitan borough except parish of Lamesley. Unparished area split into two parts, north and south of Lamesley. Larger northern part equivalent to combined pre-1974 areas of: Blaydon Urban District.; Felling Urban District.; Gateshead County Borough.; Ryton Urban District.; Whickham Urban District.
Tyne and Wear	Gateshead	Birtley	No	Pre-2006 parish of Birtley. Smaller of two unparished areas in Gateshead, separated from larger unparished area to the north by the parish of Lamesley.
Tyne and Wear	Newcastle upon Tyne	Newcastle upon Tyne, Gosforth and Newburn	No	Part of modern city which covers combined pre-1974 areas of: Gosforth Urban District.; Newburn Urban District.; Newcastle upon Tyne County Borough, less parish of Blakelaw and North Fenham (created 2001).; Moot Hall and Precincts, Newcastle upon Tyne (a small exclave of Northumberland in central Newcastle which contained Northumberland County Hall).
Tyne and Wear	North Tyneside	Earsdon, Longbenton, Tynemouth, Wallsend and Whitley Bay	No	Whole metropolitan borough, being combined pre-1974 areas of: Longbenton Urban District.; Backworth, Earsdon, and Shiremoor area from Seaton Valley Urban District (main part of which went to Blyth Valley).; Tynemouth County Borough.; Wallsend Municipal Borough.; Whitley Bay Municipal Borough (main part, less the Hartley area which went to Blyth Valley).
Tyne and Wear	South Tyneside	Boldon, Hebburn, Jarrow and South Shields	No	Whole metropolitan borough, being combined pre-1974 areas of: Boldon Urban District.; Hebburn Urban District.; Jarrow Municipal Borough.; South Shields County Borough.
Tyne and Wear	Sunderland	Sunderland, Houghton-le-Spring and Washington	No	Whole city except parishes of Burdon, Hetton, and Warden Law. The unparished area is equivalent to the pre-1974 areas of: Houghton-le-Spring Urban District.; Sunderland County Borough.; Washington Urban District plus parts removed from neighbouring parishes of Birtley, Harraton, and South Biddick which were within the designated area of Washington New Town.
Warwickshire	Nuneaton and Bedworth	Nuneaton and Bedworth	No	Whole borough, being combined pre-1974 areas of: Bedworth Urban District.; Nuneaton Municipal Borough.
Warwickshire	Rugby	Rugby	No	Part of modern borough which was pre-1974 Rugby Municipal Borough.
West Midlands	Birmingham	Birmingham	No	Whole city except parishes of New Frankley in Birmingham (created 2000 from area which had been in Bromsgrove prior to 1995) and Sutton Coldfield (created 2016). Unparished area equivalent to pre-1974 Birmingham County Borough.
West Midlands	Coventry	Coventry	No	Whole city except parishes of Allesley, Finham, and Keresley. Unparished area equivalent to pre-1974 Coventry County Borough, less parish of Finham (created 2016).
West Midlands	Dudley	Dudley, Halesowen and Stourbridge	No	Whole metropolitan borough, being combined pre-1974 areas of: Dudley County Borough (which had absorbed main parts of Brierley Hill Urban District, Coseley Urban District, and Sedgley Urban District in 1966).; Halesowen Municipal Borough.; Stourbridge Municipal Borough (which had absorbed main part of Amblecote Urban District in 1966).
West Midlands	Sandwell	Warley and West Bromwich	No	Whole metropolitan borough, being combined pre-1974 areas of: West Bromwich County Borough (which had absorbed main parts of Tipton Urban District and Wednesbury Municipal Borough in 1966).; Warley County Borough (itself created in 1966 from merger of Smethwick County Borough, Oldbury Municipal Borough, and Rowley Regis Municipal Borough).
West Midlands	Solihull	Solihull	No	Part of modern metropolitan borough which was pre-1974 Solihull County Borough.
West Midlands	Walsall	Walsall and Aldridge-Brownhills	No	Whole metropolitan borough, being combined pre-1974 areas of: Aldridge-Brownhills Urban District (itself created in 1966 from merger of Aldridge Urban District and Brownhills Urban District).; Walsall County Borough (which had absorbed Darlaston Urban District and main part of Willenhall Urban District in 1966).
West Midlands	Wolverhampton	Wolverhampton	No	Whole city, being pre-1974 Wolverhampton County Borough (which had absorbed main parts of Bilston Urban District, Tettenhall Urban District, and Wednesfield Urban District in 1966).
Worcestershire	Bromsgrove	Bromsgrove	No	One of two areas remaining unparished from pre-1974 Bromsgrove Urban District following creation of parishes of Barnt Green, Bournheath, Catshill, Finstall, and Lickey (all created 1993). (A Lickey End parish was created in 2001, but abolished 2011 to revert to being part of the unparished area.) This larger unparished area covers town of Bromsgrove, the smaller unparished area to north covers part of Rubery.
Worcestershire	Bromsgrove	Rubery area	No	Smaller of two remaining unparished areas from pre-1974 Bromsgrove Urban District, covering part of the Rubery area on the border with Birmingham.
Worcestershire	Redditch	Redditch	No	Whole borough, less parish of Feckenham (created 1983).
Worcestershire	Worcester	Worcester	No	Whole city, except parishes of St Peter the Great County and Warndon. Unparished area equivalent to pre-1974 Worcester County Borough.
East Riding of Yorkshire	Kingston upon Hull	Kingston upon Hull	No	Whole city.
North Yorkshire	Middlesbrough	Middlesbrough	No	Whole borough, except parishes of Stainton and Thornton (created 1986), and Nunthorpe (added to Middlesbrough in 1974). Unparished area created in 1974 was similar in area to former Middlesbrough County Borough which had been absorbed into Teesside County Borough in 1968.
North Yorkshire	Redcar and Cleveland	Redcar and Eston area	No	Northern part of borough, representing parts of pre-1974 Teesside County Borough that were included in Langbaurgh district in 1974. Unparished area similar in area to combined pre-1968 areas of: Eston Urban District.; Kirkleatham and Wilton areas from Guisborough Urban District.; Ormesby Civil Parish.; Redcar Municipal Borough.
North Yorkshire	York	York	No	Part of modern city which was pre-1996 City of York (equivalent to pre-1974 York County Borough).
South Yorkshire	Barnsley	Barnsley, Brierley, Cudworth, Darfield, Darton, Dearne, Dodworth, Hoyland Nether, Royston, Wombwell and Worsbrough	No	Part of the metropolitan borough which covers the combined former areas of: Barnsley County Borough (abolished 1974).; Brierley Civil Parish (abolished 2016).; Cudworth Urban District (abolished 1974).; Darfield Urban District (abolished 1974).; Darton Urban District (abolished 1974).; Dearne Urban District (abolished 1974, having been created in 1937 as a merger of Bolton upon Dearne Urban District and Thurnscoe Urban District).; Dodworth Urban District (abolished 1974).; Hoyland Nether Urban District (abolished 1974).; Royston Urban District (abolished 1974).; Wombwell Urban District (abolished 1974).; Worsbrough Urban District (abolished 1974).
South Yorkshire	Doncaster	Doncaster, Adwick le Street and Bentley with Arksey	No	Unparished part of the modern metropolitan borough is equivalent to the combined pre-1974 areas of: Adwick le Street Urban District.; Bentley with Arksey Urban District.; Doncaster County Borough.
South Yorkshire	Doncaster	Conisbrough and Mexborough	No	Combined pre-1974 areas of: Conisbrough Urban District.; Mexborough Urban District.
South Yorkshire	Rotherham	Rotherham, Rawmarsh, Swinton and Wath upon Dearne	No	Unparished part of the modern metropolitan borough is equivalent to the combined pre-1974 areas of: Rawmarsh Urban District.; Rotherham County Borough.; Swinton Urban District.; Wath upon Dearne Urban District.
South Yorkshire	Sheffield	Sheffield	No	Part of modern city which was pre-1974 Sheffield County Borough.
West Yorkshire	Bradford	Bradford and Queensbury	No	Part of modern city which was combined pre-1974 areas of: Bradford County Borough, less parishes of Clayton, Sandy Lane, and Wrose (all created 2004), and Trident (created 2009).; Queensbury part of Queensbury and Shelf Urban District (Shelf went to Calderdale).
West Yorkshire	Calderdale	Brighouse, Elland, Halifax, Shelf and Sowerby Bridge	No	Unparished part of metropolitan borough is equivalent to the combined pre-1974 areas of: Brighouse Municipal Borough.; Elland Urban District, less parish of Stainland and District (created 2017).; Halifax County Borough.; Sowerby Bridge Urban District.; Shelf part of Queensbury and Shelf Urban District (Queensbury went to Bradford).
West Yorkshire	Kirklees	Batley, Dewsbury, Heckmondwike and Spenborough	No	Combined pre-1974 areas of: Batley Municipal Borough.; Dewsbury County Borough.; Heckmondwike Urban District.; Spenborough Municipal Borough.
West Yorkshire	Kirklees	Huddersfield and Colne Valley	No	Combined pre-1974 of: Colne Valley Urban District.; Huddersfield County Borough.
West Yorkshire	Leeds	Garforth	No	Pre-1974 Garforth Urban District, less parishes of Allerton Bywater (created 1999) and Kippax (created 2004).
West Yorkshire	Leeds	Leeds, Aireborough, Ardsley East and West, Pudsey and Rothwell	No	Part of modern city which covers combined pre-1974 areas of: Aireborough Urban District (which had been created in 1937 as merger of Guiseley Urban District, Rawdon Urban District, and Yeadon Urban District), less parish of Rawdon (created 2013).; Leeds County Borough, less parishes of Shadwell (created 2002) and Alwoodley (created 2008).; Morley Municipal Borough, less parishes of Morley (created 2000), Drighlington and Gildersome (both created 2004). (Remaining unparished area from Morley borough being East Ardsley area.); Pudsey Municipal Borough.; Rothwell Urban District.
West Yorkshire	Leeds	Ledston	No	Part of modern city which covers pre-2023 area of: Ledston civil parish
West Yorkshire	Wakefield	Castleford, Pontefract, and Knottingley	No	Combined pre-1974 areas of: Castleford Municipal Borough.; Pontefract Municipal Borough.; Knottingley Urban District.
West Yorkshire	Wakefield	Wakefield, Horbury, Ossett and Stanley	No	Part of modern city which covers combined pre-1974 areas of: Horbury Urban District.; Ossett Municipal Borough.; Stanley Urban District.; Wakefield County Borough.
West Yorkshire	Wakefield	Wintersett	No	Part of modern city which covers pre-2023 area of: Wintersett civil parish

== Unparished areas in 1974 and subsequent changes ==
This is a list of unparished areas as they existed on 1 April 1974, noting changes which have happened since then to create the current geography in the table above.

Avon (County abolished in 1996 and six districts replaced by four unitary authorities: names of successor unitary authorities where different shown in brackets.)
District	Unparished area	Changes since 1974
Bath (Bath and North East Somerset)	all (former county borough of Bath)	still unparished, with charter trustees since 1996
Bristol	all (former county borough of Bristol)	still unparished
Kingswood (South Gloucestershire)	all (former urban districts of Kingswood and Mangotsfield)	became part of South Gloucestershire district in 1996. Parish of Downend and Bromley Heath created in 2003, remainder parished as Kingswood and Staple Hill and Mangotsfield in 2023
Northavon (South Gloucestershire)	none	
Wansdyke (Bath and North East Somerset)	former urban district of Keynsham	Divided into two new parishes of Keynsham and Saltford in 1991
Woodspring (North Somerset)	former borough of Weston-super-Mare	parish of Weston-super-Mare created in 2000
Bedfordshire (Four districts replaced by three unitary authorities in 2009: names of successor unitary authorities where different shown in brackets.)
District	Unparished area	Changes since 1974
Bedford	former borough of Bedford	still unparished (apart from one parish in the Brickhill area of the town established in 2004)
Luton	all (former county borough of Luton)	still unparished
Mid Bedfordshire (Central Bedfordshire)	none	
South Bedfordshire (Central Bedfordshire)	former borough of Dunstable	New parish of Dunstable formed in 1985, with remainder of unparished area transferred to existing parish of Houghton Regis.
Berkshire (Six districts became unitary authorities in 1998: names of the unitary authorities where different shown in brackets.)
District	Unparished area	Changes since 1974
Bracknell (Bracknell Forest)	none	
Newbury (West Berkshire)	former borough of Newbury	Newbury parish formed in 1997
Reading	all (former county borough of Reading)	still unparished
Slough	former borough of Slough	still unparished (a Colnbrook with Poyle parish created in territory taken from South Bucks and Spelthorne in 1995). Britwell and Wexham Court parishes were created in 1974 for the areas added to Slough from Burnham and Wexham parishes. An order to abolish these two parishes was made in 2019, but the order was quashed in court and so the two parishes continue.
Wokingham	none	
Windsor and Maidenhead	former boroughs of Maidenhead and New Windsor	still unparished
Buckinghamshire (Four districts replaced by a unitary authority in 2020, Milton Keynes became unitary in 1997.)
District	Unparished area	Changes since 1974
Aylesbury Vale (Buckinghamshire)	former borough of Aylesbury	Divided into three new parishes of Aylesbury, Coldharbour and Watermead in 2001.
Beaconsfield (Buckinghamshire)	none	
Chiltern (Buckinghamshire)	none	
Milton Keynes	former urban districts of Bletchley, Newport Pagnell and Wolverton	The entire Borough is now parished.
Wycombe (Buckinghamshire)	former borough of High Wycombe	still unparished
Cambridgeshire
District	Unparished area	Changes since 1974
Cambridge	all (former borough of Cambridge)	still unparished
East Cambridgeshire	none	
Fenland	former urban district of Whittlesey	Parished in 1981 as Whittlesey.
Huntingdon (Huntingdonshire)	none	
Peterborough	former borough of Peterborough and urban district of Old Fletton	Part of Peterborough became parish of Bretton in 1994. In 2010 a new parish of Hampton Hargate and Vale was created from part of Peterborough. In 2004 the unpopulated parish of Stanground North was abolished and its area became unparished.
South Cambridgeshire	none	
Cheshire (Six districts replaced by two unitary authorities in 2009: names of successor unitary authorities where different shown in brackets, Halton and Warrington became unitary in 1998.)
District	Unparished area	Changes since 1974
Chester (Cheshire West and Chester)	former county borough of Chester	part transferred to Great Boughton
Congleton (Cheshire East)	former borough of Congleton	Parished in 1980 as Congleton
Crewe and Nantwich (Cheshire East)	former borough of Crewe	To form a parish of Crewe in 2013
Ellesmere Port (Ellesmere Port and Neston, Cheshire West and Chester)	former borough of Ellesmere Port and urban district of Neston	Parish of Ince created 1987, parish of Neston created 2009, with Burton, Ellesmere Port and Willaston still unparished. A further part of Ellesmere Port transferred to Ince and Little Stanney,
Halton	former borough of Widnes and urban district of Runcorn	Parish of Halebank formed part of Widnes and parish of Sandymoor formed from part of Runcorn in 2008.
Macclesfield (Cheshire East)	former borough of Macclesfield and urban district of Wilmslow	Wilmslow divided into three new parishes of Handforth, Styal and Wilmslow in 2011. Macclesfield parished in 2015.
Vale Royal (Cheshire West and Chester)	none	
Warrington	former county borough of Warrington	
Cleveland (County abolished in 1996 and four districts replaced by four unitary authorities: names of successor unitary authorities where different shown in brackets.)
District	Unparished area	Changes since 1974
Hartlepool	former county borough of Hartlepool	Headland parished as in 1999.
Middlesbrough	Part of the former County Borough of Teesside	Nunthorpe remained parished due to not being in the former county borough. Stainton and Thornton had been added to Teesside County Borough in 1968 and therefore formed part of the Middlesbrough unparished area until recreated as a parish in 1986.
Langbaurgh (Redcar and Cleveland)	Part of the former Teesside County Borough, covering the pre-1968 Eston Urban District, Redcar Municipal Borough, parts of Guisborough Urban District (around Kirkleatham and Wilton) and the former parish of Ormesby from Stokesley Rural District.	Still unparished.
Stockton-on-Tees	part of the former county borough of Teesside	Thornaby-on-Tees parish created in 1995. Billingham parish created in 2007.
Cornwall (Six districts replaced by a unitary authority in 2009.)
District	Unparished area	Changes since 1974
Caradon (Cornwall)	none	
Carrick (Cornwall)	none	
Isles of Scilly	none	
Kerrier (Cornwall)	former urban district of Camborne-Redruth	Divided into eight parishes: Camborne, Carharrack, Carn Brea, Illogan, Lanner, Portreath, Redruth and St Day in 1985.
North Cornwall (Cornwall)	none	
Penwith (Cornwall)	former borough of Penzance	Parished in 1980 as Penzance
Restormel (Cornwall)	former borough of St. Austell with Fowey, urban district of Newquay	Newquay parished as two parishes of Crantock and Newquay in 1983, part of St Austell with Fowey divided into four parishes (Fowey, Mevagissey, St Blaise and Tywardreath) in 1983; remainder divided into the further four parishes of St Austell (now St Austell Town Council), Carlyon, St Austell Bay, and Pentewan Valley with effect from 1 April 2009.
Cumbria (Six districts replaced by two unitary authorities in 2023: names of successor unitary authorities where different shown in brackets.)
District	Unparished area	Changes since 1974
Allerdale (Cumberland)	former borough of Workington	Parished in 1982 as Workington
Barrow-in-Furness (Westmorland and Furness)	former county borough of Barrow-in-Furness	Parished in 2023 as Barrow
Carlisle (Cumberland)	former County Borough of Carlisle	still unparished
Copeland (Cumberland)	former borough of Whitehaven	Parished in 2015 as Whitehaven
Eden (Westmorland and Furness)	former urban district of Penrith	Parished in 2015 as Penrith
South Lakeland (Westmorland and Furness)	none	
Derbyshire
District	Unparished area	Changes since 1974
Amber Valley	former urban districts of Alfreton and Heanor	Partly parished in 1984: Alfreton divided into three parishes: Alfreton, Somercotes and Swanwick, Riddings remained unparished; Heanor divided into four parishes: Aldercar and Langley Mill, Codnor, Heanor and Loscoe and Ironville.
Bolsover	none	
Chesterfield	former borough of Chesterfield	still unparished
Derby	all (former county borough of Derby)	still unparished
Erewash	former borough of Ilkeston and urban district of Long Eaton	Part of Long Eaton parished as Sawley in 1999.
High Peak	former boroughs of Buxton and Glossop	still unparished
North East Derbyshire	none	
South Derbyshire	former urban district of Swadlincote	still unparished
West Derbyshire (Derbyshire Dales)	former urban district of Matlock	Parts of unparished area divided into six new parishes of Bonsall, Darley Dale, Matlock Bath, Northwood and Tinkersley, South Darley and Tansley in 1980. Remainder of unparished area divided into two civil parishes (Cromford and Matlock Town) in 1983.
Devon
District	Unparished area	Changes since 1974
East Devon	former urban district of Exmouth	parished in 1996 as Exmouth
Exeter	all (former county borough of Exeter)	still unparished
North Devon	none	
Plymouth	all (former county borough of Plymouth)	still unparished
South Hams	none	
Teignbridge	none	
Tiverton (Mid Devon)	none	
Torbay	All (former county borough of Torbay)	Part parished as Brixham in 2007.
Torridge	Lundy Island formerly a civil parish, now regarded as an unparished area.	
West Devon	none	
Dorset (Six districts and two existing unitaries replaced by two unitary authorities in 2019: names of successor unitary authorities where different shown in brackets.)
District	Unparished area	Changes since 1974
Bournemouth (Bournemouth, Christchurch and Poole)	all (former county borough of Bournemouth)	Holdenhurst Village created in 2013 and later Holdenhurst Village was merged to form a larger Throop and Holdenhurst which included more of the unparished area, rest parished in 2026 as Bournemouth
Christchurch (Bournemouth, Christchurch and Poole)	former borough of Christchurch	parished as Christchurch and Highcliffe and Walkford in 2019
East Dorset (Dorset)	none	
North Dorset (Dorset)	none	
Poole (Bournemouth, Christchurch and Poole)	all (former borough of Poole)	parished as Poole and Broadstone in 2026
Purbeck (Dorset)	none	
West Dorset (Dorset)	none	
Weymouth and Portland (Dorset)	former borough of Weymouth and Melcombe Regis	Parished as Weymouth in 2019.
Durham (Seven districts replaced by a unitary authority in 2009, Darlington became unitary in 1997.)
District	Unparished area	Changes since 1974
Chester-le-Street (County Durham)	former urban district of Chester-le-Street	still unparished
Darlington	former county borough of Darlington	still unparished
Durham (County Durham)	former borough of Durham and Framwelgate	Parish of City of Durham formed in 2018. Three areas remain unparished.
Derwentside (County Durham)	former urban districts of Consett and Stanley	Stanley parished in 2008. Consett and part of Stanley still unparished.
Easington (County Durham)	former urban district of Seaham	Parished in 1983 as Seaham.
Sedgefield (County Durham)	none	
Teesdale (County Durham)	none	
Wear Valley (County Durham)	former urban districts of Bishop Auckland and Crook and Willington	Part of former urban district parished Dene Valley and Witton-le-Wear parish in 1999. Part parished as Bishop Auckland in 2007, part of Crook and Willington parished as Greater Willington in 2007. Crook and part of Bishop Auckland still unparished.
East Sussex (The districts of Brighton and Hove were merged to form the unitary authority of Brighton and Hove in 1997.)
District	Unparished area	Changes since 1974
Brighton (Brighton and Hove)	all (former county borough of Brighton)	Part parished as Rottingdean in 1995.
Eastbourne	all (former county borough of Eastbourne)	still unparished
Hastings	all (former county borough of Hastings)	still unparished
Hove (Brighton and Hove)	all (former borough of Hove and urban district of Portslade-by-Sea)	still unparished
Lewes	former urban district of Seaford	Parished in 1999 as Seaford.
Rother	former borough of Bexhill	Parished in 2021 as Bexhill-on-Sea.
Wealden	none	
Essex
District	Unparished area	Changes since 1974
Basildon	all (former urban district of Basildon)	Parishes of Billericay, Great Burstead and South Green, Little Burstead, Ramsden Bellhouse and Ramsden Crays created in 1996. Parish of Noak Bridge formed in 2002. Parish of Shotgate formed in 2007. Parish of Bowers Gifford and North Benfleet formed 2010. Remainder still unparished.
Braintree	former urban districts of Braintree and Bocking and Witham	Witham divided into three new parishes of Rivenhall, Silver End and Witham in 1982. Braintree and Bocking still unparished.
Brentwood	former urban district of Brentwood	Part formed into two parishes of Herongate and Ingrave and West Horndon in 2002.
Castle Point	all (former urban districts of Benfleet and Canvey Island)	Canvey Island parish formed 2007
Chelmsford	former borough of Chelmsford	Part parished as Chelmer and Chelmsford Garden in 2023
Colchester	former borough of Colchester	Part parished as Myland in 1999. Part of the parish of East Donyland was added to the unparished area in 2004.
Epping Forest	former urban district of Chigwell	parished since 1996 - Buckhurst Hill, Chigwell, and Loughton
Harlow	all (former urban district of Harlow)	still unparished
Maldon	former urban district of Maldon	Divided into two parishes of Heybridge and Maldon in 1987.
Rochford	former urban district of Rayleigh	Part parished as Rawreth in 1994. Remainder parished as Rayleigh in 1996.
Southend-on-Sea	all (former county borough of Southend-on-Sea)	Part parished as Leigh-on-Sea in 1996. Remainder still unparished.
Tendring	former urban district of Clacton	
Thurrock	all (former urban district of Thurrock)	still unparished
Uttlesford	none	
Gloucestershire
District	Unparished area	Changes since 1974
Cotswold	none	
Cheltenham	all (former borough of Cheltenham and urban district of Charlton Kings)	The unparished area was enlarged in 1991 at the same time as four civil parishes were transferred, with altered boundaries, from Tewkesbury District. Charlton Kings was parished in 1995. The remainder (the town of Cheltenham) remains unparished. In 2018 part of the unparished area was transferred to the parishes of Charlton Kings, Leckhampton, Prestbury and Up Hatherley.
Forest of Dean	none	
Gloucester	all (former county borough of Gloucester)	Still unparished. (The parish of Quedgeley was transferred to Gloucester District in 1991.)
Stroud	former urban district of Stroud	Parished in 1990: Most to a new Stroud parish with parts to form a new parish of Cainscross and part transferred to existing parish of Rodborough.
Tewkesbury	none	
Greater Manchester
District	Unparished area	Changes since 1974
Bolton	the former County Borough of Bolton, borough of Farnworth, urban districts of Kearsley, Little Lever, South Turton and Westhoughton	Westhoughton parished in 1985. Rest and part of the former Westhoughton urban district remain unparished.
Bury	all (former County Borough of Bury, boroughs of Prestwich and Radcliffe, urban districts of Tottington, Whitefield, part Ramsbottom, Affetside part of Turton)	still unparished
Manchester	the former county borough of Manchester	still unparished
Oldham	former County Borough of Oldham, urban districts of Chadderton, Crompton, Failsworth, Lees and Royton	Crompton parish formed in April 1987 and renamed to Shaw and Crompton in July 1987. Other areas still unparished.
Rochdale	all (former County Borough of Rochdale, boroughs of Heywood and Middleton, urban districts of Littleborough, Milnrow and Wardle)	still unparished
Salford	all (former County Borough of Salford, boroughs of Eccles and Swinton and Pendlebury, urban districts of Irlam and Worsley)	still unparished
Stockport	all (former County Borough of Stockport, urban districts of Bredbury and Romiley, Cheadle and Gatley, Hazel Grove and Bramhall and Marple)	Offerton Estate parish formed in 2002, renamed to Offerton Park in 2006, and abolished in 2011.
Tameside	all (former boroughs of Ashton-under-Lyne, Dukinfield, Hyde, Mossley, Stalybridge, urban districts of Audenshaw, Denton, Droylsden and Longdendale)	Mossley parish formed in 1999 Remainder still unparished.
Trafford	former boroughs of Altrincham, Sale, Stretford, urban districts of Bowdon, Hale, Urmston	still unparished
Wigan	former County Borough of Wigan, borough of Leigh, urban districts of Abram, Aspull, Ashton-in-Makerfield (part), Atherton, Billinge and Winstanley (part), Golborne (part), Hindley, Ince-in-Makerfield, Orrell, Standish with Langtree and Tyldesley	still unparished
Hampshire
District	Unparished area	Changes since 1974
Basingstoke and Deane	former borough of Basingstoke	still unparished.
Eastleigh	former borough of Eastleigh	Part parished as Bishopstoke in 1995. Part parished as Allbrook and as Chandler's Ford in 2010. Boyatt Wood and Eastleigh Town formed in 2021.
East Hampshire	none	
Fareham	all (former urban district of Fareham)	still unparished
Gosport	all (former borough of Gosport)	still unparished
Hart	former urban district of Fleet	Divided into four parishes of Church Crookham, Elvetham Heath, Ewshot and Fleet in 2010.
Havant	all (former urban district of Havant and Waterloo)	still unparished
New Forest	former borough of Lymington	Divided into four parishes: Hordle, Lymington and Pennington, Milford-on-Sea and New Milton in 1979.
Portsmouth	all (former county borough of Portsmouth)	Southsea parish formed in 1999, parish dissolved 2010 and entire district now unparished.
Rushmoor	all (former borough of Aldershot and urban district of Farnborough)	still unparished
Southampton	all (former county borough of Southampton)	still unparished
Test Valley	former borough of Andover	Part parished as Charlton in 1984. Part parished as Enham Alamein in 2007. Remainder constituted parish of Andover in 2010.
Winchester	former borough of Winchester	Part parished as Badger Farm in 1985. Remainder still unparished.
Hereford and Worcester (County abolished in 1998 with some districts transferred to a reconstituted Worcestershire and some merged to form a unitary Herefordshire. Where unparished areas were transferred to new districts the name of the new district is shown in brackets.)
District	Unparished area	Changes since 1974
Bromsgrove	former urban district of Bromsgrove	Parts constituted as five parishes: Barnt Green, Bournheath, Catshill, Finstall and Lickey in 1993. Part parished as Lickey End in 2001. Part of the unparished area was transferred to the existing parish of Stoke Prior in 2004. The parish of Lickey End was abolished in 2011 and it and the remainder of the area remains unparished.
Hereford (Herefordshire)	all (former City of Hereford)	Hereford district abolished 1998, parished in 2000 as Hereford and Belmont Rural, remainder added to Clehonger
Leominster (Herefordshire)	none	
Malvern Hills	former urban district of Malvern	Part formed into the parishes of Malvern Wells and West Malvern in 1986. The remainder parished as Malvern in 1995.
Redditch	all (former urban district of Redditch)	Parish of Feckenham formed in 1983. Remainder still unparished.
South Herefordshire (Herefordshire)	none	
Worcester	former borough of Worcester	still unparished
Wychavon	none	
Wyre Forest	former borough of Kidderminster	Kidderminster parish formed in 2016
Hertfordshire
District	Unparished area	Changes since 1974
Broxbourne	all (former urban districts of Cheshunt and Hoddesdon)	still unparished
Dacorum	former borough of Hemel Hempstead	still unparished
East Hertfordshire	none	
Hertsmere	former urban districts of Bushey and Potters Bar	Part of former Potters Bar UD parished as South Mimms in 2008. Remainder still unparished.
North Hertfordshire	former urban districts of Baldock, Hitchin, Letchworth	Letchworth parished as Letchworth Garden City in 2005, and abolished in 2013, Baldock and Hitchin still unparished
St Albans	former borough of St Albans	still unparished
Stevenage	all (former urban district of Stevenage)	still unparished
Three Rivers	former urban district of Rickmansworth	Part parished as Croxley Green in 1986, another part parished as Batchworth in 2017, remainder still unparished.
Watford	former borough of Watford	still unparished
Welwyn Hatfield	former urban district of Welwyn Garden City	still unparished
Humberside (County abolished in 1996 and nine districts replaced by four unitary authorities: names of successor unitary authorities where different shown in brackets.)
District	Unparished area	Changes since 1974
Beverley (East Riding of Yorkshire)	former borough of Beverley and former urban district of Haltemprice	Part of Haltemprice parished as Hessle in 1986. Another part of Haltemprice parished as Cottingham and parish of Beverley formed in 1999. Remainder of Haltemprice divided into parishes of Anlaby with Anlaby Common, Kirk Ella and Willerby in 2000.
Boothferry (East Riding of Yorkshire / North Lincolnshire)	former borough of Goole	Parish formed in 1983 as Goole.
Cleethorpes (North East Lincolnshire)	former borough of Cleethorpes	still unparished
Glanford (North Lincolnshire)	none	
Grimsby (North East Lincolnshire)	all (former county borough of Grimsby)	Part parished as Great Coates in 2003. Remainder still unparished.
Holderness (East Riding of Yorkshire)	former urban district of Withernsea	Parished in 1983 as Withernsea.
Kingston upon Hull	all (former county borough of Kingston upon Hull)	still unparished
North Wolds renamed East Yorkshire (East Riding of Yorkshire)	former borough of Bridlington, former urban district of Driffield	Driffield parished in 1981, Bridlington parished in 2000
Scunthorpe (North Lincolnshire)	all (former borough of Scunthorpe)	still unparished
Isle of Wight (The two districts were abolished in 1995 and replaced by a single unitary authority.)
District	Unparished area	Changes since 1974
Medina	all (former boroughs of Newport and Ryde, urban district of Cowes)	Partly parished in 1985: Cowes and Gurnard parishes formed part of former Cowes Urban District, St Helens formed from part of former Borough of Ryde, Wootton formed from part of former Borough of Newport. Part of former Borough of Ryde parished as Seaview in 1989. East Cowes parished in 1998. Part of remainder of former Borough of Ryde divided into two parishes of Fishbourne and Havenstreet and Ashey in 2006. Remainder of unparished area divided into parishes of Newport, Northwood, Ryde and Whippingham in 2008.
South Wight	former urban district of Sandown-Shanklin	Divided into three parishes of Lake, Sandown and Shanklin in 1984.
Kent (In 1998 the districts of Gillingham and Rochester-upon-Medway were merged to form a new Medway unitary authority.)
District	Unparished area	Changes since 1974
Ashford	former urban district of Ashford	parishes of Kennington and South Willesborough and Newtown formed in 2019, remainder still unparished
Canterbury	former county borough of Canterbury and urban districts of Herne Bay and Whitstable	Part of Herne Bay parished as Herne & Broomfield and part of Whitstable as Chestfield in 1988. Remainder still unparished.
Dartford	former borough of Dartford	still unparished
Dover	former boroughs of Deal and Dover	Part of Dover parished as River in 1987. Dover parished in 1996 Former Borough of Deal divided into Deal and Walmer parishes.
Gillingham (Medway)	all (former borough of Gillingham)	still unparished
Gravesham	former borough of Gravesend and urban district of Northfleet	still unparished
Maidstone	former borough of Maidstone	Part parished as Tovil, with small part forming part of new parish of Downswood in 1987. Remainder still unparished.
Medway: renamed City of Rochester-upon-Medway (Medway)	former boroughs of Chatham, Rochester	still unparished
Sevenoaks	none	
Shepway (Folkestone and Hythe)	former borough of Folkestone	Folkestone parished in 2004
Swale	former borough of Queenborough-in-Sheppey and urban district of Sittingbourne and Milton	Queenborough parished in 1983 Minster-on-Sea parished in 2003 Leysdown, Eastchurch and Sheerness parishes also have been created but Halfway Houses and Sittingbourne and Milton remain unparished
Thanet	former boroughs of Margate and Ramsgate	Ramsgate parished in 2009 Birchington and parts of Manston were covered by the former Borough of Margate and are now parished, further part of former Borough of Margate parished as Westgate in 2015.
Tonbridge and Malling	former urban district of Tonbridge	
Tunbridge Wells	former borough of Royal Tunbridge Wells	
Lancashire
District	Unparished area	Changes since 1974
Blackburn (Blackburn with Darwen)	former county borough of Blackburn, borough of Darwen	Darwen is a parish since 2009, the Hoddlesden part of Darwen borough remains unparished
Blackpool	all (former county borough of Blackpool)	
Burnley	former county borough of Burnley, urban district of Padiham	Padiham is a parish since 2002
Chorley	former borough of Chorley	part parished as Astley Village in 1991.
Fylde	former borough of Lytham St. Anne's	St Anne's on the Sea was created in 2005, Lytham was parished in April 2025.
Hyndburn	former borough of Accrington, urban districts of Church, Clayton-le-Moors, Great Harwood, Oswaldtwistle and Rishton	
Lancaster	former borough of Lancaster and Morecambe and Heysham	Morecambe parished in 2009 parish of Aldcliffe-with-Stodday formed in 2017
Pendle	former boroughs of Colne and Nelson, urban districts of Barnoldswick, Barrowford, Brierfield, Earby, Trawden	entirely parished, parishes of Barnoldswick, Barrowford, Bracewell and Brogden (merger of two parishes and unparished area) and Trawden Forest formed in 1987, Brierfield, Earby, Kelbrook and Sough (formerly part of Earby) and Laneshaw Bridge (formerly part of Colne) in 1992, parishes of Colne and Nelson formed in 2008
Preston	former County Borough of Preston, urban district of Fulwood	Ingol and Tanterton is a parish since 2012
Ribble Valley	none	
Rossendale	former boroughs of Bacup, Haslingden, Rawtenstall, urban district of Ramsbottom (part)	
South Ribble	former urban districts of Leyland and Walton-le-Dale	
West Lancashire	former urban districts of Ormskirk and Skelmersdale and Holland	Burscough, Lathom, Newburgh and Up Holland are parishes since 1983; Lathom South is a parish since 2007.
Wyre	former borough of Fleetwood, urban districts of Poulton-le-Fylde and Thornton Cleveleys	Fleetwood is a parish since 2009
Leicestershire
District	Unparished area	Changes since 1974
Blaby	none	
Charnwood	former borough of Loughborough	part of the unparished area transferred to Cotes in 2019, part of Woodhouse was transferred to the unparished area part became part of the new parish of Stonebow Village
Charnwood	former urban district of Shepshed	parished as Shepshed
Harborough	former urban district of Market Harborough	still unparished
Hinckley and Bosworth	former urban district of Hinckley	partly (Burbage, Earl Shilton, Stoke Golding), core Hinckley still unparished
Leicester	all (former county borough of Leicester)	still unparished
Melton	former urban district of Melton Mowbray	still unparished
North West Leicestershire	former urban district of Coalville	Ellistown and Battleflat created from part of former Coalville UD, Whitwick created in 2011, otherwise remains unparished
Oadby and Wigston	all (former urban districts of Oadby and Wigston)	still unparished
Rutland	none	
Lincolnshire
District	Unparished area	Changes since 1974
Boston	former borough of Boston	
East Lindsey	none	
Lincoln	all (former county borough of Lincoln)	
North Kesteven	none	
South Holland	former urban district of Spalding	
South Kesteven	former borough of Grantham	parish of Grantham formed in 2024
West Lindsey	former urban district of Gainsborough	parish of Gainsborough formed in 1992
Merseyside
District	Unparished area	Changes since 1974
Knowsley	former urban districts of Huyton with Roby, Kirkby and Prescot	Parish of Prescot formed in 1983, parish of Tarbock abolished in 2014.
Liverpool	all (former county borough of Liverpool)	still unparished
St Helens	former county borough of St Helens, urban districts of Haydock and Newton-le-Willows	
Sefton	former county boroughs of Bootle and Southport, borough of Crosby, urban districts of Formby and Litherland	Hightown created from part of former Crosby borough in 2000, and Formby parished in 2004.
Wirral	all (former county boroughs of Birkenhead and Wallasey, borough of Bebington, urban districts of Hoylake and Wirral)	still unparished
Norfolk
District	Unparished area	Changes since 1974
Breckland	none	
Broadland	none	
Great Yarmouth	former county borough of Great Yarmouth	
North Norfolk	none	
Norwich	all (former county borough of Norwich)	
South Norfolk	none	
West Norfolk (King's Lynn and West Norfolk)	former borough of King's Lynn	
North Yorkshire
District	Unparished area	Changes since 1974
Craven	none	
Hambleton	none	
Harrogate	former municipal borough of Harrogate	Parish of Pannal and Burn Bridge formed 2016, rest parished in 2025
Richmondshire	none	
Ryedale	none	
Scarborough	former municipal borough of Scarborough	Eastfield parish created in 1999, rest of former borough parished in 2025.
Selby	none	
York	all (former county borough of York)	added parishes in Ryedale, Selby and Harrogate districts in 1996, original area still unparished
Northamptonshire (Seven districts replaced by two unitary authorities in 2021: names of successor unitary authorities where different shown in brackets.)
District	Unparished area	Changes since 1974
Corby (North Northamptonshire)	former urban district of Corby	Parished as Corby in 2021.
Daventry (West Northamptonshire)	former borough of Daventry	parished as Daventry in 2003
East Northamptonshire (North Northamptonshire)	former urban district of Rushden	parished as Rushden
Kettering (North Northamptonshire)	former borough of Kettering	part parished as Barton Seagrave in 2001, remainder parished as Kettering Town in 2021.
Northampton (West Northamptonshire)	former county borough of Northampton	parished in 2020 as Far Cotton and Delapre, Kingsthorpe and Northampton
South Northamptonshire (West Northamptonshire)	none	
Wellingborough (North Northamptonshire)	former urban district of Wellingborough	parished as Wellingborough
Northumberland (Six districts replaced by a unitary authority in 2009.)
District	Unparished area	Changes since 1974
Alnwick	none	
Berwick-upon-Tweed	former borough of Berwick-upon-Tweed	parished as Berwick-upon-Tweed in 2008
Blyth Valley	all (former borough of Blyth, part of Whitley Bay, part of urban district of Seaton Valley)	parishes of Blyth and Seaton Valley formed in 2009
Castle Morpeth	former borough of Morpeth	parished as Morpeth in 1984
Tynedale	none	
Wansbeck	all (former urban districts of Ashington, Bedlingtonshire and Newbiggin-by-the-Sea)	parishes of Ashington, Newbiggin by the Sea, North Bedlington (now Choppington), East Bedlington and West Bedlington formed in 2009
Nottinghamshire
District	Unparished area	Changes since 1974
Ashfield	former urban districts of Hucknall, Kirkby in Ashfield and Sutton in Ashfield	still unparished
Bassetlaw	former boroughs of East Retford and Worksop	Civil parishes of Clumber and Hardwick, Rhodesia and Shireoaks created. East Retford and the remainder of Worksop remain unparished.
Broxtowe	former urban district of Beeston and Stapleford	Stapleford parished in 1987; Beeston, Chilwell, Toton, Attenborough and Bramcote remain unparished
Gedling	former urban districts of Arnold and Carlton	Civil parish of Colwick created. Arnold and the remainder of Carlton remain unparished.
Mansfield	former borough of Mansfield and urban district of Mansfield Woodhouse	still unparished
Newark (Newark and Sherwood)	former borough of Newark	Civil parish of Newark created (1980).
Nottingham	all (former county borough of Nottingham)	still unparished
Rushcliffe	former urban district of West Bridgford	still unparished
Oxfordshire
District	Unparished area	Changes since 1974
Cherwell	former borough of Banbury	parished in 2000 as Banbury
Oxford	all (former county borough of Oxford)	majority still unparished: four parishes formed: Blackbird Leys (1990), Littlemore, Old Marston, Risinghurst and Sandhills
South Oxfordshire	none	
Vale of White Horse	none	
West Oxfordshire	none	
Shropshire (Five districts replaced by a unitary authority in 2009: names of successor unitary authorities where different shown in brackets, Telford and Wrekin became unitary in 1998.)
Pre-2009 District	Unparished area	Changes since 1974
Bridgnorth (Shropshire)	none	
North Shropshire (Shropshire)	none	
Oswestry (Shropshire)	none	
Shrewsbury and Atcham (Shropshire)	former borough of Shrewsbury	parished in 2008 as Shrewsbury
South Shropshire (Shropshire)	none	
Wrekin (Telford and Wrekin)	former urban districts of Dawley, Oakengates and Wellington	now entirely parished
Somerset (Four districts replaced by a unitary authority in 2009.)
District	Unparished area	Changes since 1974
Mendip	none	
Sedgemoor	former borough of Bridgwater	parished in 2003 as Bridgwater
Taunton Deane (Somerset West and Taunton)	former borough of Taunton	parish of Taunton created in 2023
West Somerset (Somerset West and Taunton)	former urban district of Minehead	parish of Minehead created in 1986
Yeovil (South Somerset)	former borough of Yeovil	parish of Yeovil created in 1982
South Yorkshire
District	Unparished area	Changes since 1974
Barnsley	former county borough of Barnsley, urban districts of Cudworth, Darfield, Darton, Dearne, Dodworth, Hoyland Nether, Royston, Wombwell and Worsborough	Brierley parish abolished in 2016
Doncaster	former county borough of Doncaster, urban districts of Adwick le Street, Bentley with Arksey, Conisbrough and Mexborough	
Rotherham	former county borough of Rotherham, urban districts of Maltby, Rawmarsh, Swinton and Wath upon Dearne	Maltby parished 2000
Sheffield	former county borough of Sheffield	still unparished
Staffordshire
District	Unparished area	Changes since 1974
Cannock Chase	former urban districts of Cannock and Rugeley	Rugeley and Hednesford now parished, Rawnsley part of Cannock still unparished
East Staffordshire	former county borough of Burton upon Trent	2003, to various parishes
Lichfield	former borough of Lichfield	parished in 1980 as Lichfield
Newcastle-under-Lyme	former borough of Newcastle-under-Lyme	
South Staffordshire	none	
Stafford	former borough of Stafford	
Staffordshire Moorlands	none	
Stoke-on-Trent	all (former county borough of Stoke-on-Trent)	
Tamworth	all (former borough of Tamworth)	
Suffolk
District	Unparished area	Changes since 1974
Babergh	none	
Ipswich	all (former county borough of Ipswich)	still unparished
Mid Suffolk	none	
Forest Heath (West Suffolk)	former urban district of Newmarket	parished in 1999 as Newmarket and Exning
St Edmundsbury (West Suffolk)	former borough of Bury St Edmunds and urban district of Haverhill	Hardwick abolished in 1988 and became unparished Haverhill parished in 1989, Bury St Edmunds (also covering the former Hardwick parish) parished in 2003
Suffolk Coastal (East Suffolk)	none	
Waveney (East Suffolk)	former borough of Lowestoft	parishes of Lowestoft and Oulton Broad formed in 2017
Surrey
District	Unparished area	Changes since 1974
Elmbridge	all (former urban districts of Esher and Walton and Weybridge)	one parish (Claygate) created in 2000
Epsom and Ewell	all (former borough of Epsom and Ewell)	
Guildford	former borough of Guildford	
Mole Valley	former urban districts of Dorking and Leatherhead	
Reigate and Banstead	former borough of Reigate and urban district of Banstead	
Runnymede	all (former urban districts of Chertsey and Egham)	still unparished
Spelthorne	all (former urban districts of Staines and Sunbury)	still unparished
Surrey Heath	former urban district of Frimley and Camberley	still unparished
Tandridge	former urban district of Caterham and Warlingham	entirely parished in 2000
Waverley	former urban district of Farnham	parished as Farnham
Woking	all (former urban district of Woking)	Byfleet parish created in 1989 and abolished 2010
Tyne and Wear
District	Unparished area	Changes since 1974
Gateshead	former county borough of Gateshead, urban districts of Blaydon, Felling, Ryton and Whickham	still unparished. parish of Birtley became unparished in 2006
Newcastle upon Tyne	former county borough of Newcastle upon Tyne, urban districts of Gosforth and Newburn	a Blakelaw and North Fenham parish set up in 2001, rest remains unparished
North Tyneside	all (former county borough of Tynemouth, boroughs of Wallsend and Whitley Bay (part), urban districts of Longbenton, Seaton Valley (part))	still unparished
South Tyneside	all (former county borough of South Shields, borough of Jarrow, urban districts of Boldon and Hebburn)	still unparished
Sunderland	former County Borough of Sunderland, urban districts of Houghton-le-Spring and Washington	still unparished
Warwickshire
District	Unparished area	Changes since 1974
North Warwickshire	none	
Nuneaton (Nuneaton and Bedworth)	all (former borough of Nuneaton, urban district of Bedworth)	
Rugby	former borough of Rugby	
Stratford-on-Avon	none	
Warwick	former borough of Royal Leamington Spa	2002
West Midlands
District	Unparished area	Changes since 1974
Birmingham	all (former county borough of Birmingham and borough of Sutton Coldfield)	New Frankley in Birmingham parish created in 2000 from land prior to 1995 in Bromsgrove district, Sutton Coldfield parish formed in 2016
Coventry	former county borough of Coventry	parish of Finham formed in 2016
Dudley	all (former county borough of Dudley and boroughs of Halesowen and Stourbridge	still unparished
Sandwell	all (former county boroughs of West Bromwich and Warley)	still unparished
Solihull	former county borough of Solihull	part of the unparished area transferred to Hampton in Arden in 2019
Walsall	all (former county borough of Walsall and urban district of Aldridge-Brownhills)	
Wolverhampton	all (former county borough of Wolverhampton)	still unparished
West Sussex
District	Unparished area	Changes since 1974
Adur	former urban districts of Shoreham-by-Sea and Southwick	still unparished
Arun	former urban districts of Bognor Regis and Littlehampton	both parished as Bognor Regis and Littlehampton
Chichester	none	
Crawley	all (former urban district of Crawley)	
Horsham	former urban district of Horsham	part transferred to new parish of North Horsham (created 1987). rest parished as Horsham in 2026
Mid Sussex	former urban district of Cuckfield	Cuckfield parished
Worthing	all (former borough of Worthing)	still unparished
West Yorkshire
District	Unparished area	Changes since 1974
Bradford	former county borough of Bradford, borough of Keighley, urban districts of Baildon, Bingley and Shipley, Queensbury and Shelf (part)	Keighley parished in 2002, various parts of former county borough parished in 2004 as Clayton, Sandy Lane, Wilsden and Wrose. Trident parish also created from part of Former county borough in 2009. Parishes of Baildon and Harden formed in 2007. Bingley and Shipley now parished.
Calderdale	former county borough of Halifax, borough of Brighouse, urban districts of Elland and Sowerby Bridge, Queensbury and Shelf (part)	part parished as Stainland and District in 2018, rest still unparished
Kirklees	former county boroughs of Dewsbury and Huddersfield, boroughs of Batley and Spenborough, urban districts of Colne Valley, Heckmondwike and Mirfield	Mirfield parish created 1988, rest still unparished
Leeds	former county borough of Leeds, boroughs of Morley and Pudsey, urban districts of Aireborough, Garforth, Horsforth, Rothwell and former parish of Ledston	various parishes created. Morley parish does not include some areas that had been in the pre-1974 borough Parishes of Allerton Bywater and Horsforth formed in 1999. Parish of Rawdon formed in 2012 from part of Aireborough. Ledston parish abolished
Wakefield	former county borough of Wakefield, boroughs of Castleford, Ossett and Pontefract, urban districts of Horbury, Knottingley, Stanley and former parish of Wintersett	Wintersett parish abolished in 2023
Wiltshire (Four districts replaced by a unitary authority in 2009, Swindon became unitary in 1997.)
District	Unparished area	Changes since 1974
Kennet (Wiltshire)	none	
North Wiltshire (Wiltshire)	none	
Salisbury (Wiltshire)	former borough of Salisbury (New Sarum)	parished in 2009 as Salisbury
Thamesdown (Swindon)	former borough of Swindon	parished with effect from 1 April 2017
West Wiltshire (Wiltshire)	none	

== See also ==
- Extra-parochial area
- Unincorporated area in other countries
