= Little Waltham =

Village in Essex, England

Coordinates: 51.8000°N 0.4833°E

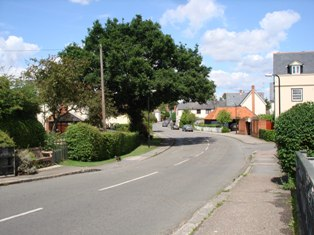
- Village centre

- Location within Essex
- Population: 1,950 (Parish, 2021)
- OS grid reference: TL7012
- Shire county: Essex
- Region: East
- Country: England
- Sovereign state: United Kingdom
- Post town: CHELMSFORD
- Postcode district: CM3
- Dialling code: 01245
- Police: Essex
- Fire: Essex
- Ambulance: East of England
- UK Parliament: North West Essex

Little Waltham is a village and civil parish in the Chelmsford district of Essex, England, lying 3 miles (5 km) north of the centre of Chelmsford itself. At the 2021 census the parish had a population of 1,950. Since that census the parish has ceded some territory to the new parish of Chelmsford Garden.

It is adjacent to the village of Great Waltham. The Domesday Book refers to the two villages as Waltham, consisting of several manors. The site of an Iron Age village was excavated before upgrading the main road north between the current villages.

The village straddles the River Chelmer. Its main street has a number of old houses near the bridge, notably a rare Essex example of a Wealden hall house, now divided into three cottages. A footpath leads south alongside the river to a nature reserve. The countryside is under continued threat from housing and road development.

== Amenities ==
The parish church, St Mary the Virgin, is dedicated to St Martin of Tours, and has a Norman south door with a window above. Its East window features local landmarks shown at the foot of the cross. There is also a United Reformed Church in The Street.

There is a pub in the centre of the village, The White Hart. The village has a doctor's surgery in Brook Hill, with a pharmacy on site.

There are two main halls in the village, Tufnell Hall and the Memorial Hall. Tufnell Hall is home to the Little Waltham Sports and Social Club, which hosts the village football team as well as badminton. Tufnell Hall has a main hall which is available for hire for functions, plus a separate bar area open to members and visitors. The Memorial Hall is used by the Little Waltham Preschool and is also used as the polling station for elections. The United Reformed Church also has a smaller hall which is primarily used for church functions plus Hillside Playcare.

== Sport ==
The village currently has two football clubs, Waltham United and The Rodings & Waltham. The former, nicknamed "The Tigers" are a Sunday League Team who have two teams in the Chelmsford Sunday Leage Setup. The Rodings & Waltham team are a Saturday club who play their football in the Essex & Suffolk Border League. Both clubs play their home games at Little Waltham Sports and Social Club.

A short-lived greyhound racing track was opened in the spring of 1930 on the main Braintree-Chelmsford Road. The racing on Friday evenings was independent (not affiliated to the sports governing body the National Greyhound Racing Club) and was known as a flapping track, which was the nickname given to independent tracks. The grass track held races over 550 yards races and had a covered stand with refreshments available on site. The four-acre site near Ash Tree Corner was put up for sale in February 1931; meetings after this were organised by the Waltham Greyhound and Whippet Club. Equipment from the track at New Writtle Street Stadium was installed here in March 1936.

== Education ==
Most Primary School age children in Little Waltham attend either Little Waltham Church of England Primary School, with some attending Great Waltham Church of England Primary School nearby. High School age children typically attend Chelmer Valley High School in nearby Broomfield. There are also two preschools in Little Waltham for 2- to 5-year-olds; Little Waltham Preschool at the Memorial Hall, and Hillside at the U.R.C.
