= Cudworth Urban District =

History of the West Riding of Yorkshire, England

Coordinates: 53.484°N 1.226°W

Cudworth
- Urban district
- Area
- 1,746 acres (707 ha)
- Population
  - 1911: 6,824
  - 1931: 9377
  - 1961: 9045
- History
  - Created: 1 April 1900
  - Abolished: 31 March 1974
  - Succeeded by: Metropolitan Borough of Barnsley
- Contained within
  - County Council: West Riding
- Map of boundary as of 1971

Cudworth was an urban district in the West Riding of Yorkshire, England, between 1900 and 1974. It encompassed the towns of Cudworth and Upper Cudworth.

== History ==
Local government for the area began with the establishment of Barnsley Rural Sanitary District in 1875, which was abolished in 1894 with the introduction of the new system of rural and urban districts. Cudworth was initially a parish within the Barnsley Rural District, but the new district very quickly began to lose territory as the rapid population expansion due to the opening of the deep mine collieries created the need for the urban district councils to act as the first tier of the local authority. Cudworth sat within Barnsley RD for only six years until 1900 at which point the Cudworth Urban District was created.

Cudworth Urban District Council was a second tier local authority under the West Riding County Council. Cudworth UDC was responsible for a great many changes within its boundaries including the development of a number of housing estates, including the Newtown and Birkwood estates and the much later Crown estate. In order to build the Newtown Estate it was necessary in 1922 to demolish the old Manor House which previously stood on the site occupied by the houses on Lunn Road bearing the inscription commemorating the new estate.

Cudworth UD was abolished under the Local Government Act 1972, becoming part of the new Metropolitan Borough of Barnsley by a merger with the County Borough of Barnsley, Darfield, Darton, Dearne, Dodworth, Hoyland Nether, Penistone, Royston, Wombwell and Worsbrough urban districts, along with Penistone Rural District, part of Hemsworth Rural District and part of Wortley Rural District, all in the West Riding of Yorkshire. No successor parish was created.

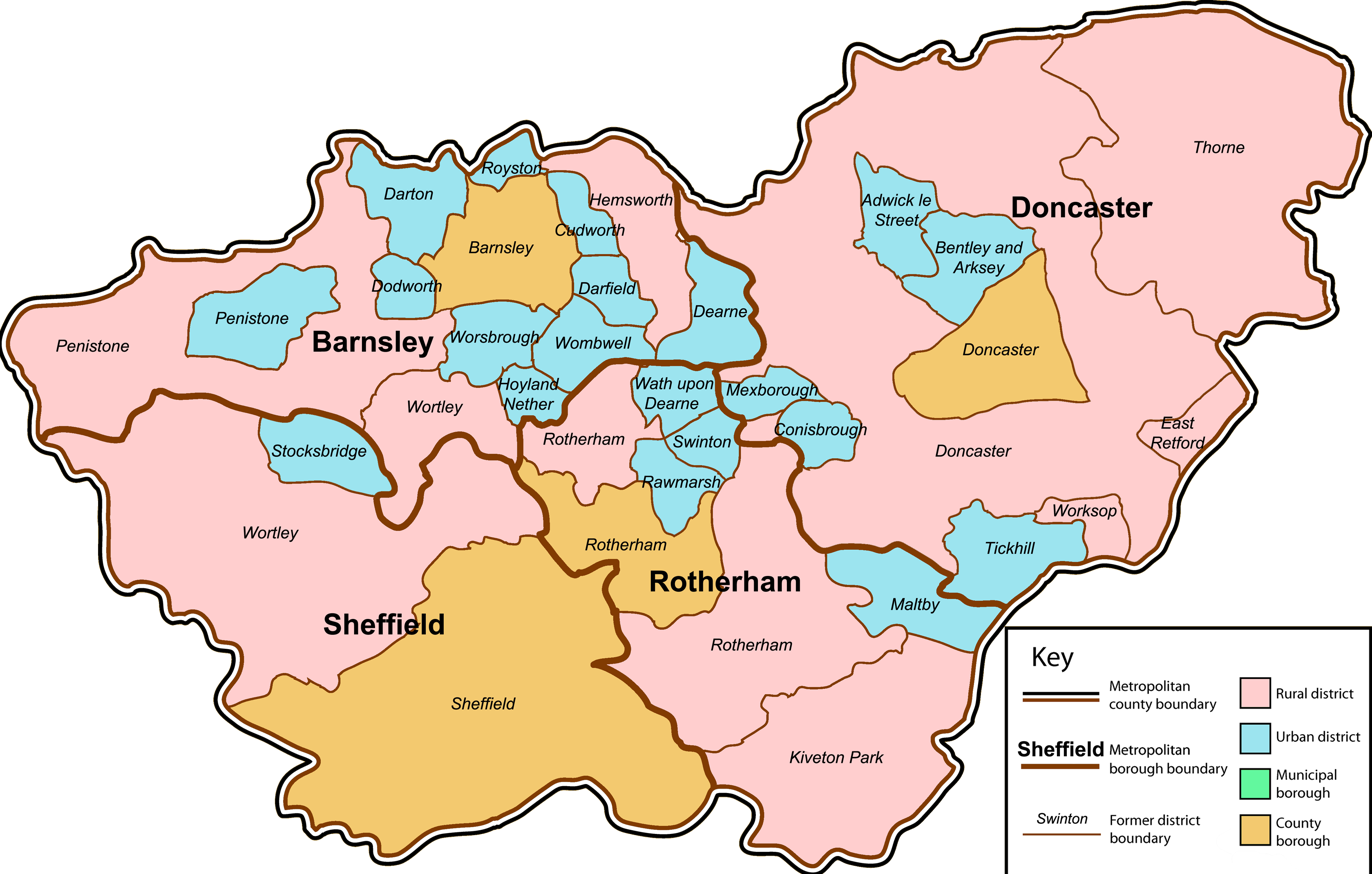
The surrounding pre-1974 districts which now make up South Yorkshire
