= Little Lever Urban District =

Former local government area in the UK

Coordinates: 53.5632°N 2.3704°W

- Area
  - 1911: 808 acres (3.3 km^{2})
  - 1971: 808 acres (3.3 km^{2})
- Population
  - 1891: 5,168
  - 1971: 9,146
- History
  - Created: 1872
  - Abolished: 1974
  - Succeeded by: Metropolitan Borough of Bolton
- Status: Local board (1872–1895); Urban district (1895–1974)

Little Lever was, from 1872 to 1974, a local government district centred on the large village of Little Lever in the administrative county of Lancashire, England.

== History ==
Little Lever was a township and chapelry in the civil and ecclesiastical parish of Bolton le Moors in the Salford Hundred of Lancashire. The township became part of the Bolton Poor Law Union on 1 February 1837 which took responsibility for funding the Poor Law within that Union area. In 1866, Little Lever was given the status of a civil parish.

In 1872, a local board of health was adopted for the civil parish of Little Lever. After the Public Health Act 1875 was passed by Parliament in that year, Little Lever Local Board of Health assumed extra duties as an urban sanitary district, although the Local Board's title did not change.

Following the implementation of the Local Government Act 1894, Little Lever Local Board was replaced by an elected urban district council. Little Lever Urban District Council had five electoral wards: Central, Church, Ladyshore, Stopes, and West, each represented by three councillors.

Under the Local Government Act 1972, Little Lever Urban District was abolished on 1 April 1974 and its former area became an unparished area in the Metropolitan Borough of Bolton in Greater Manchester.
