= Offerton Park =

Coordinates: 53.395°N 2.124°W

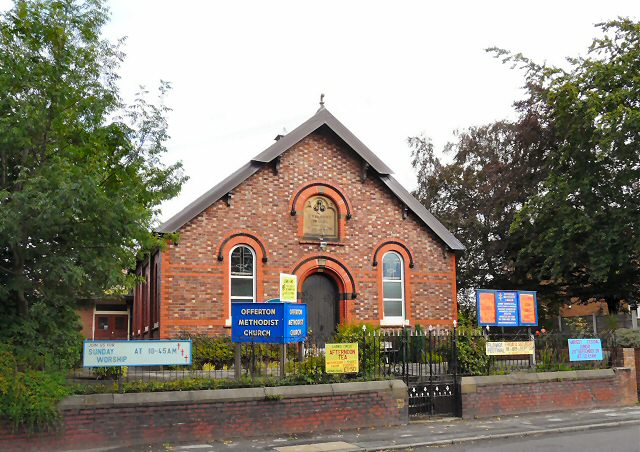
- Offerton Methodist Church

- Location within Greater Manchester
- Population: 3,762 (2001 census)
- OS grid reference: SJ917887
- Metropolitan borough: Stockport
- Metropolitan county: Greater Manchester
- Region: North West
- Country: England
- Sovereign state: United Kingdom
- Post town: STOCKPORT
- Postcode district: SK2
- Dialling code: 0161
- Police: Greater Manchester
- Fire: Greater Manchester
- Ambulance: North West
- UK Parliament: Hazel Grove

Offerton Park is an estate and former civil parish in the Metropolitan Borough of Stockport, Greater Manchester, England, south-east of Stockport town centre. The parish boundaries excluded the area of Offerton Green further to the east. At the 2001 census, it had a population of 3,762.

== Creation ==
The parish of Offerton Estate was created in 2001 from part of an unparished area. In 2006, the parish changed its name to Offerton Park.

== Abolition ==
In April 2010 Stockport Metropolitan Borough Council received two petitions from residents of the parish calling for its abolition. Under the Local Government and Public Involvement in Health Act 2007 the council was obliged to carry out a community governance review. Consultation showed that about 75% of the area's population favoured abolition, and in a poll held in July 2010 votes chose to abolish the parish council by 275 votes to 139. Stockport Council duly made an order abolishing the parish with effect from 31 March 2011.

The parish council initiated a judicial review, with the High Court ruling in September 2011 that the borough council had acted unlawfully as fewer than 17% of electors had voted so that it could be claimed that "the majority of residents held no strong view either way..." and that there was no way to know whether "the public generally, as opposed to a section of it, wished to see the parish council, or the parish abolished."

The order abolishing the parish was therefore quashed, and Stockport Council was required to re-establish the parish council, with elections held on 8 December 2011. All ten seats on the parish council were won by the "No More Parish No More Bills" Group, who were pledged to abolish the parish.

The High Court ruling was subsequently overturned at the Court of Appeal in 2012, and Stockport Council's order abolishing the parish and its council with effect from 31 March 2011 was therefore reinstated.
