= Badger Farm =

Suburb and parish of Winchester, Hampshire, England

Coordinates: 51.048790°N 1.336447°W

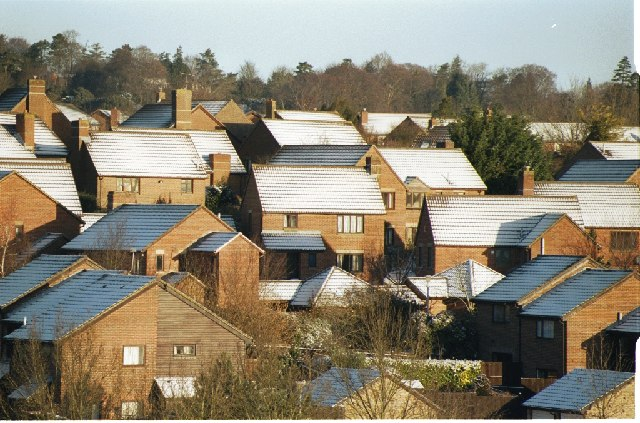
- Badger Farm roofscape

- Location within Hampshire
- OS grid reference: SU4661027925
- District: City of Winchester
- Shire county: Hampshire
- Region: South East
- Country: England
- Sovereign state: United Kingdom
- Post town: Winchester
- Postcode district: SO22
- Dialling code: 01962
- Police: Hampshire and Isle of Wight
- Fire: Hampshire and Isle of Wight
- Ambulance: South Central
- UK Parliament: Winchester

Badger Farm is a suburb to the south of the city of Winchester, in the centre of the English county of Hampshire, England. It is also a civil parish in the local government district of the City of Winchester.

The area was developed in the 1970s and 1980s, and became a parish in 1985. The development of Badger Farm was the subject of the revised Badger Farm Development brief, 1978, produced by Winchester City Council. This laid down the standards for roads, open spaces and housing. Before the development began, the Badger Farm development area was split between two parishes and two city wards. According to the 2021 census, Badger Farm had a population of 2,463.

The parish is named after William Badger, who was once a tenant farmer on the site. John O'Loughlin was owner of the land. It is located next to the other parishes of Stanmore and Oliver's Battery, alongside other areas in the city.
