= Esher Urban District =

Former local government area in the UK

Coordinates: 51.3691°N 0.365°W

Esher Esher Urban District
- Area
  - 1961: 14,850 acres (60.1 km^{2})
- Population
  - 1939: 44,439
  - 1961: 60,610
- History
  - Created: 1933
  - Abolished: 1974
  - Succeeded by: Elmbridge
- Status: Urban district
- Government: Esher Urban District Council

Esher Urban District was an urban district in Surrey, England, created by merging two urban districts and adding two parishes to the south-west. It existed from 1933 to 1974 and was governed by the elected Esher Urban District Council which shared local government functions with Surrey County Council. Its main building was the large town hall in Esher.

== Creation ==
It was created following the Local Government Act 1929 as part of a county review order from:

- East and West Molesey Urban District
- Esher and the Dittons Urban District
- From Epsom Rural District the civil parishes of Cobham and Stoke d'Abernon
- Very small parts of Surbiton Urban District (15 acres) and Walton and Weybridge Urban District (3 acres)

The district had eight wards, electing 33 councillors to Esher Urban District Council.

== Abolition ==
The district was within the Metropolitan Police District and part of the review area of the Royal Commission on Local Government in Greater London. It was proposed by the commission that Esher should form, with Walton and Weybridge, a borough in Greater London. However, neither district went on to be included in Greater London as created by the London Government Act 1963.

In 1970 there was an exchange of River Thames island territory with the London Borough of Richmond upon Thames in Greater London when Thames Ditton Island was transferred from Richmond upon Thames and Platts Eyot was transferred the other way. Both islands were previously connected to the river bank by bridges on the opposite side of the river to their respective counties.

The urban district was abolished on 1 April 1974 and became, with Walton and Weybridge, Elmbridge.
