= Bournheath =

Village in Worcestershire, England

Coordinates: 52.365118°N 2.080386°W

- Location within Worcestershire
- Population: 454
- OS grid reference: SO946741
  - London: 103 miles (166 km)
- Civil parish: Bournheath
- District: Bromsgrove
- Shire county: Worcestershire
- Region: West Midlands
- Country: England
- Sovereign state: United Kingdom
- Post town: BROMSGROVE
- Postcode district: B61
- Dialling code: 01527
- Police: West Mercia
- Fire: Hereford and Worcester
- Ambulance: West Midlands

Bournheath is a village and civil parish in the Bromsgrove District of Worcestershire, England, about three miles north of Bromsgrove. According to the 2001 census it had a population of 454.

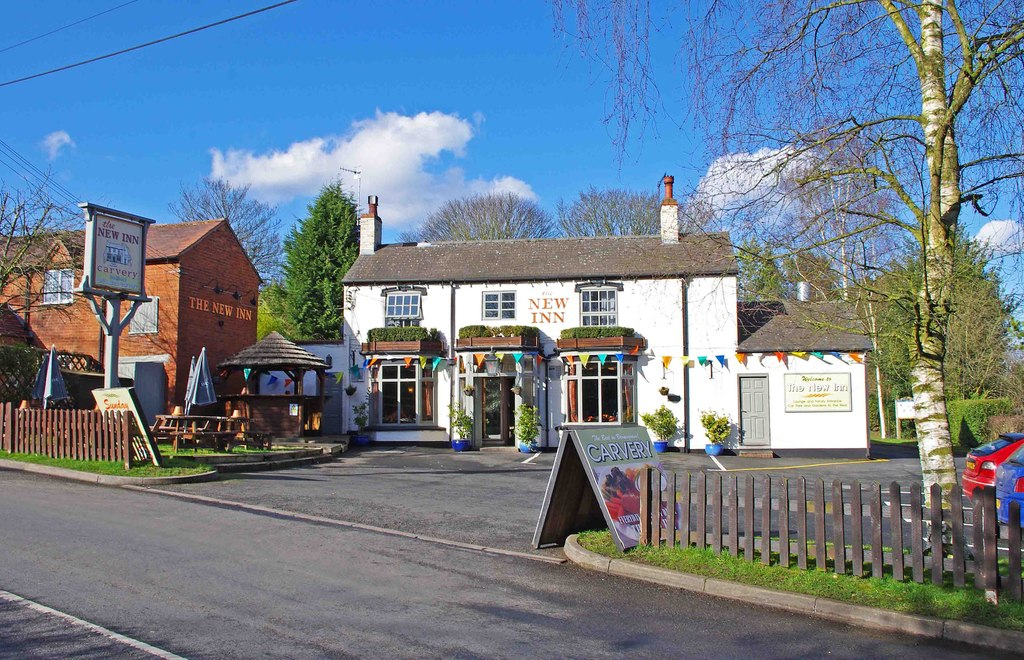
The New Inn

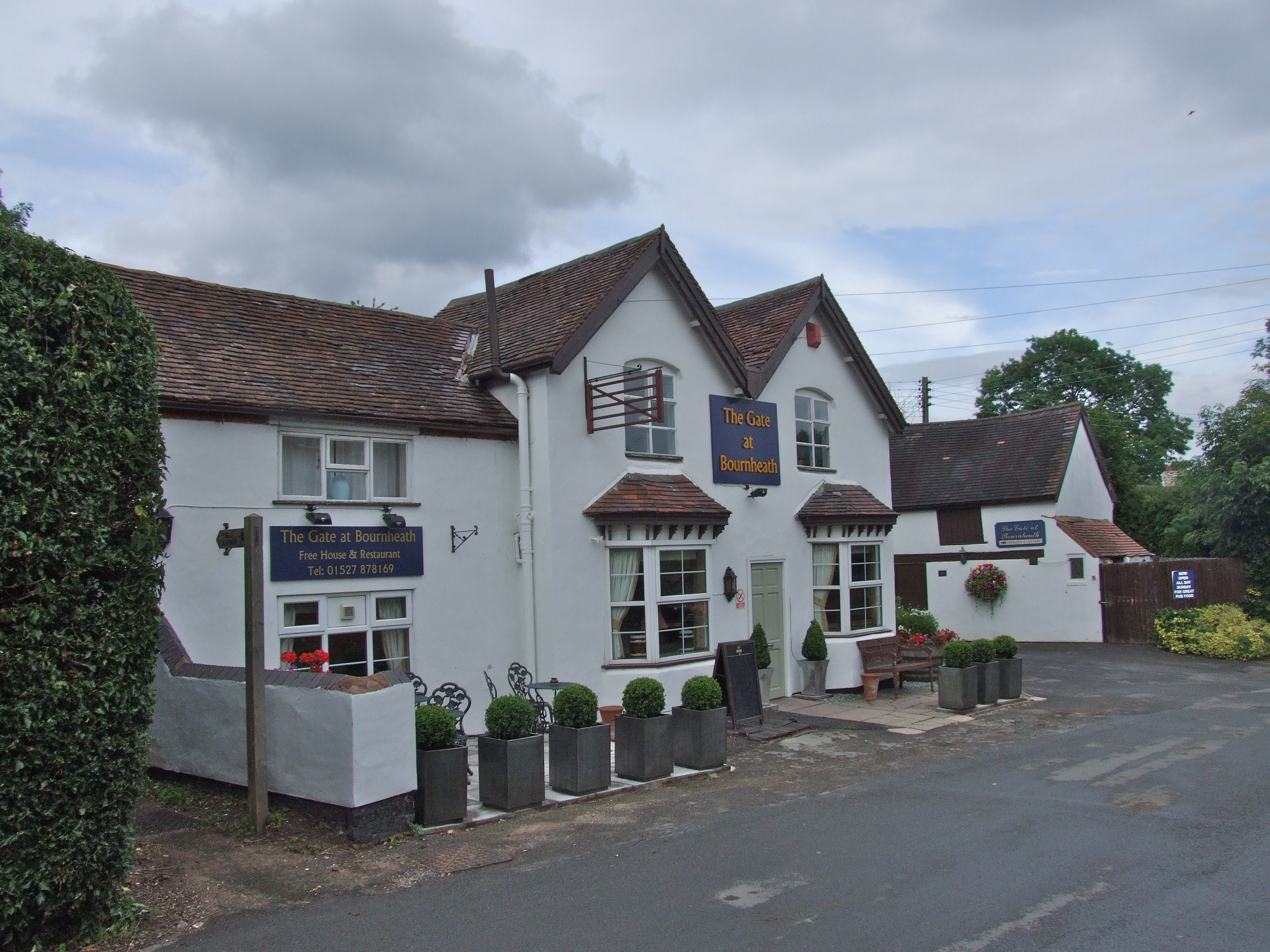
The Gate

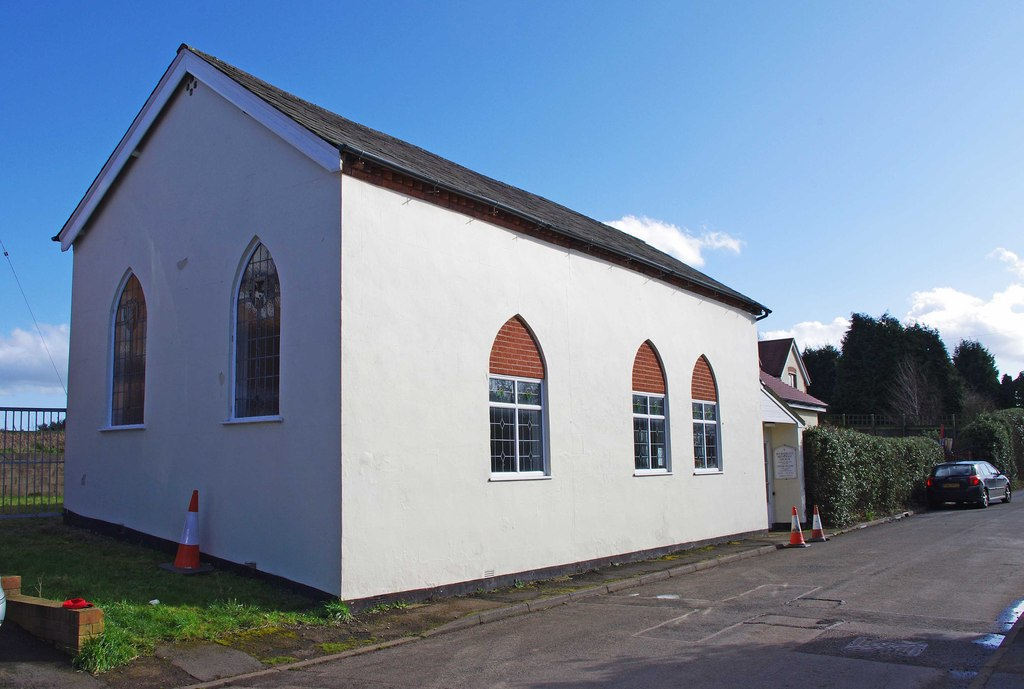
Bournheath Methodist Church

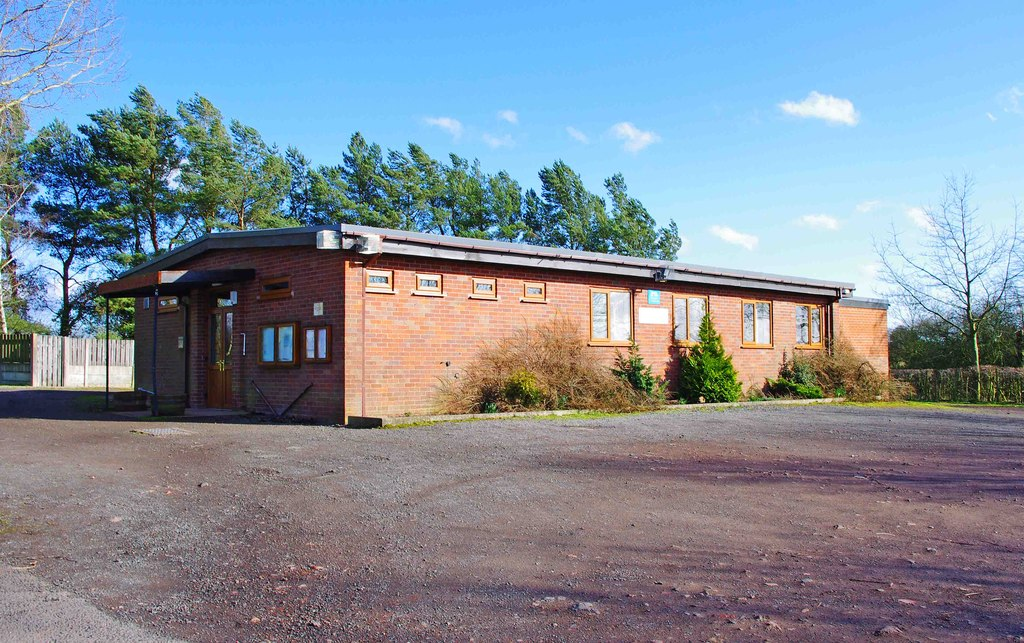
Bournheath Village Hall

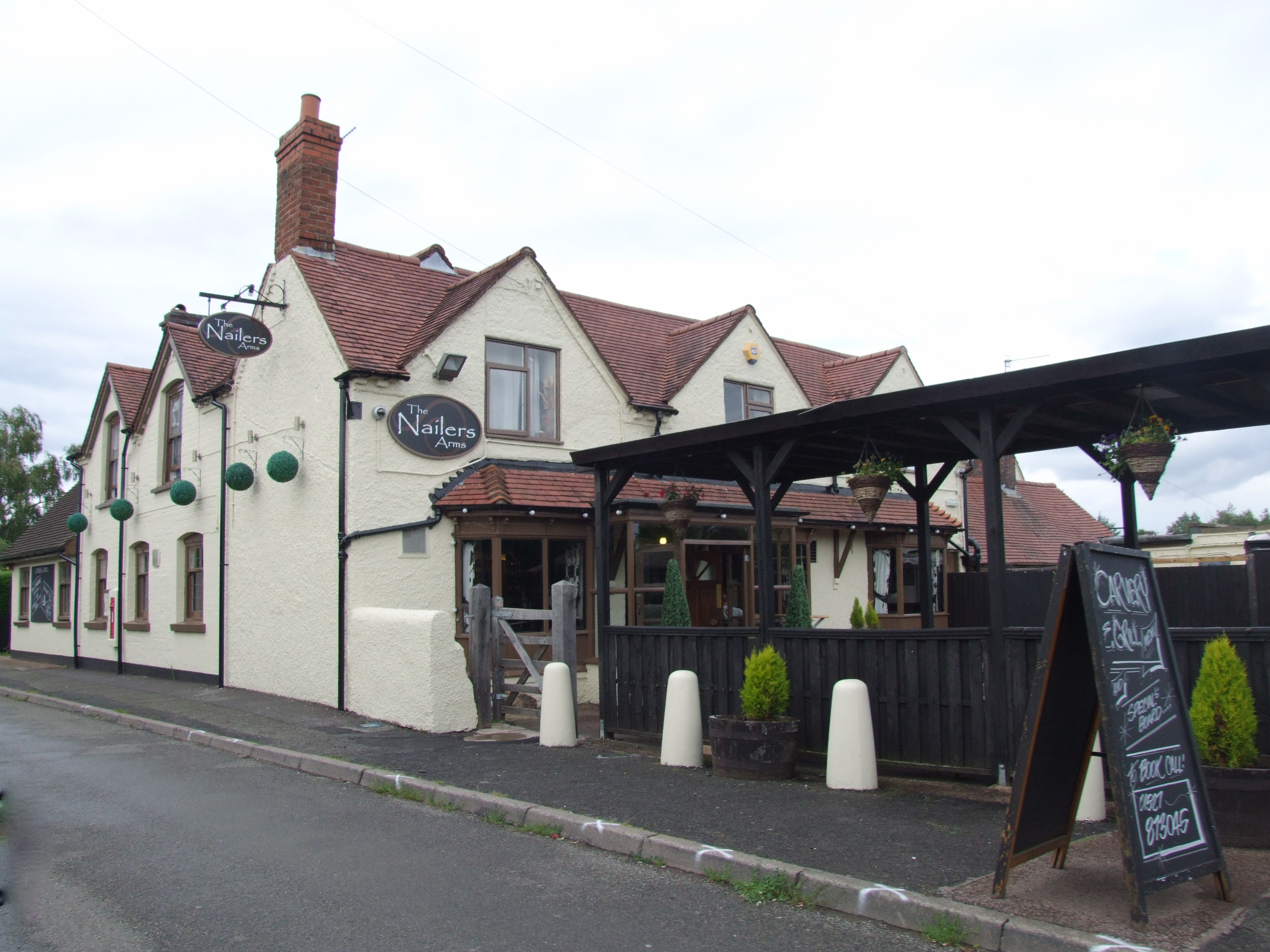
The Nailers Arms
