= Chelmsford Garden =

Civil parish in Essex, England

Coordinates: 51.760°N 0.499°E

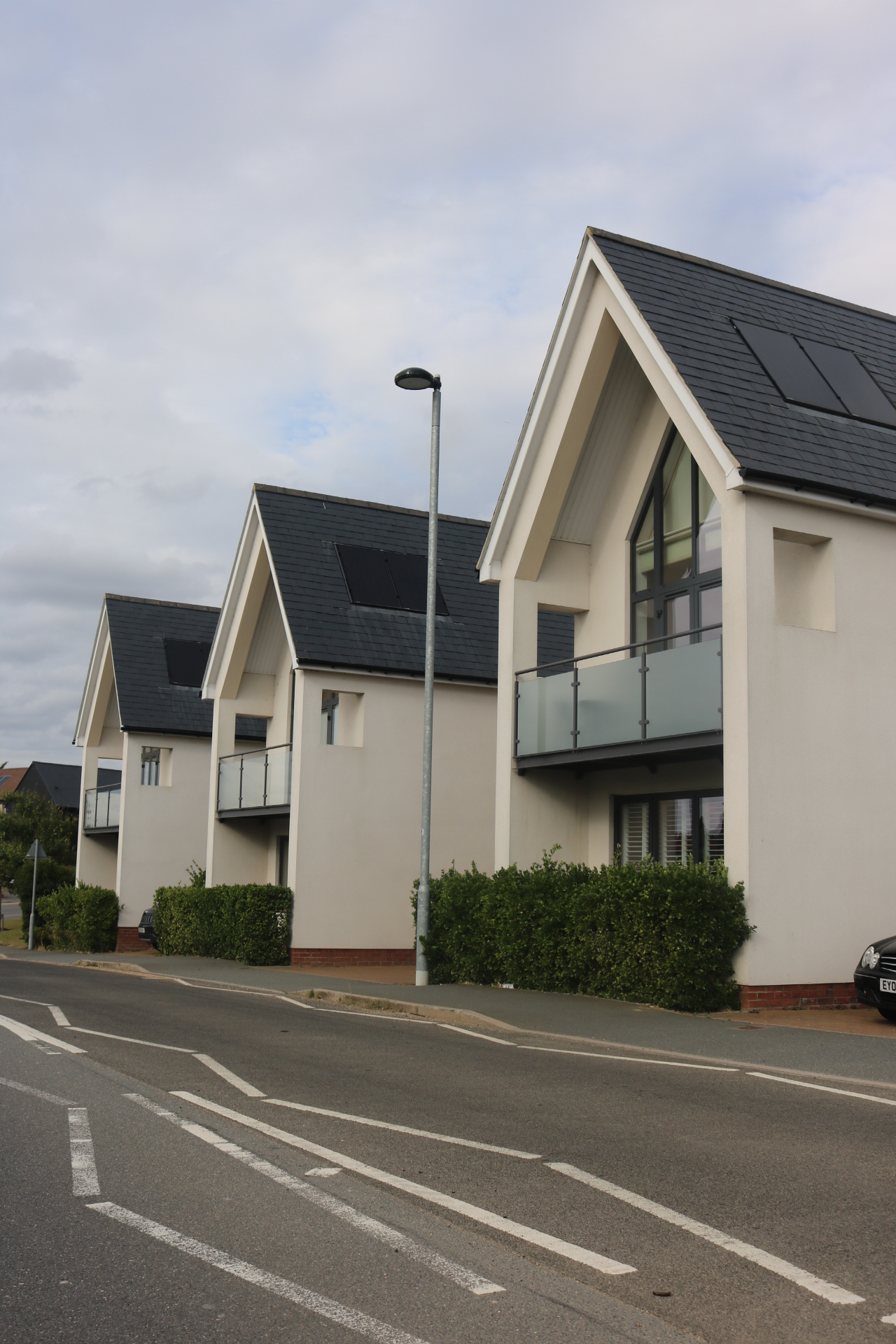
- Houses on Albatross Way

- Location within Essex
- Civil parish: Chelmsford Garden
- District: Chelmsford
- Shire county: Essex
- Region: East
- Country: England
- Sovereign state: United Kingdom
- Post town: CHELMSFORD
- Postcode district: CM1, CM3

Chelmsford Garden is a civil parish in the Chelmsford district of Essex, England. The parish was created in 2023 to cover growing suburbs on the north-east side of the city of Chelmsford, including the Beaulieu and Channels developments.

== History ==
An area north of Chelmsford was allocated for major development in the Chelmsford Core Strategy, adopted in 2008. A subsequent North Chelmsford Area Action Plan was adopted in 2011, outlining more detailed proposals for new communities both to the north-west and north-east of Chelmsford.

One of the new neighbourhoods to the north-east was given the name Beaulieu and is being developed by a joint venture of Countryside Properties and L&Q. Beaulieu's neighbourhood centre includes a community centre, health centre and other facilities.

To the north of Beaulieu is the Channels development, on the site of the former Channels Golf Club. It was developed in parcels by a number of different developers.

Beaulieu Park railway station opened in October 2025 to serve the area. Although named after one of the main developments in the parish of Chelmsford Garden, it actually lies just over the boundary in the neighbouring parish of Boreham.

== Governance ==
There are three tiers of local government covering Chelmsford Garden, at parish (community), district, and county level: Chelmsford Garden Community Council, Chelmsford City Council, and Essex County Council. The community council is based at the Beaulieu Community Centre at 17 Centenary Way.

The area historically straddled the four parishes of Boreham, Broomfield, Little Waltham, and Springfield. In 2023 a new civil parish called Chelmsford Garden was created, covering the new neighbourhoods to the north-east of the city. The council for the new parish was given the style of "community council" (rather than the default "parish council"), such that the council's name is Chelmsford Garden Community Council.
