= Municipal Borough of Chesterfield =

Former local government area in the UK

Coordinates: 53°14′N 1°25′W

Chesterfield
- Municipal Borough of Chesterfield shown within Derbyshire in 1970.
- Area
  - 1911: 2,643 acres (10.70 km^{2})
  - 1961: 8,472 acres (34.28 km^{2})
- Population
  - 1911: 37,406
  - 1961: 67,858
- History
  - Created: 1835
  - Abolished: 1974
  - Succeeded by: Chesterfield
- Status: Municipal Borough
- Government: Chesterfield Borough Council

Chesterfield was a municipal borough in Derbyshire, England from 1835 to 1974. It was formed under the Municipal Corporations Act 1835 from the Ancient borough of Chesterfield.

In 1974 under the Local Government Act 1972 the borough was abolished and combined with the Staveley Urban District and the Brimington civil parish of Chesterfield Rural District to form the new Chesterfield borough.
