= Walton and Weybridge Urban District =

Former local government area in the UK

Coordinates: 51°23′N 0°25′W

Walton and Weybridge
- Area
  - 1951: 9,052 acres (36.63 km^{2})
  - 1971: 9,049 acres (36.62 km^{2})
- Population
  - 1931: 25,658
  - 1961: 45,510
  - 1971: 51,146
- Density
  - 1961: 5.1/acre
- History
  - Preceded by: Walton on Thames Urban District; Weybridge Urban District
  - Created: 1933
  - Abolished: 1974
  - Succeeded by: Elmbridge
- Status: Urban district
- Government
  - HQ: Town Hall (demolished), New Zealand Avenue, Walton-on-Thames
  - Motto: Dum Defluant Amnes (Until the rivers cease to flow)
- Subdivisions
  - Type: Civil Parishes
  - Units: Walton-on-Thames Civil Parish; Weybridge Civil Parish

Walton and Weybridge Urban District was a local government district in Surrey, England, from 1933 to 1974.

== Boundaries and background ==
The district was formed by a County Review Order in 1933 by the merger of Walton-on-Thames and Weybridge Urban Districts. These in turn were the main civil (secular) successors to the medieval parishes of the same names which continued to have a very minor Civil Parish counterparts until 1974.

The year 1894 saw the mass creation of multi-function districts across the country. Thus the two Urban Districts mentioned were constituted and as was quite common, on approximately the medieval era parish boundaries. As Walton-on-Thames was by far the larger authority in population and area its offices were chosen in 1933 as those for the combined Urban District.

== Areas also included within boundaries ==
Before 1894 but in the 19th century two lesser ecclesiastical parishes, hence villages, had been legally recognised in what was the very large parish of Walton on Thames: Hersham and Oatlands. A minority, 660 acres (1.03 mi^{2}), of Byfleet was transferred from Chertsey Rural District to Walton and Weybridge Urban District on its creation in 1933.

== Successor ==
The district was abolished in 1974 by the Local Government Act 1972 as one of two contributing areas to the borough of Elmbridge, the other being larger Esher Urban District to the east, which had absorbed one other 1894-constituted urban district (East and West Molesey UD) and two village parishes (Cobham and Stoke D'Abernon) from Epsom Rural District during its currency. The successor area resurrected the approximate boundaries of the Hundred of Elmbridge, which being a hundred ceased in relevance before the 19th century.

== Demography ==
This area's population grew through a mixture of new suburban and urban homes steeply from the latter 19th century to the latter 20th century. Population density in 1961 of 5.1/acre compared to densities of 4.1/acre in Esher Urban District and 13.4/acre in the Municipal Borough of Surbiton further east.
