= Blakelaw and North Fenham =

Civil parish in Tyne and Wear, England

Coordinates: 54.992°N 1.663°W

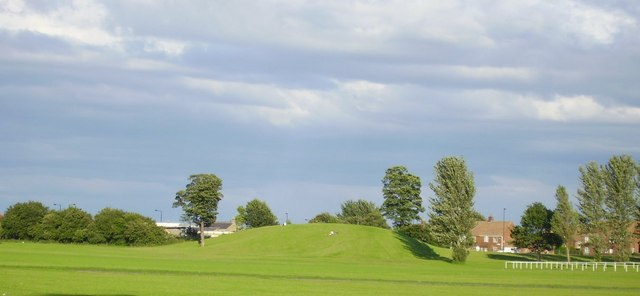
- Blakelaw Sports Field

- Location within Tyne and Wear
- Population: 6,452 (2011)
- OS grid reference: NZ2166
- Civil parish: Blakelaw and North Fenham
- Metropolitan borough: Newcastle upon Tyne
- Metropolitan county: Tyne and Wear
- Region: North East
- Country: England
- Sovereign state: United Kingdom
- Post town: NEWCASTLE UPON TYNE
- Postcode district: NE5
- Dialling code: 0191
- Police: Northumbria
- Fire: Tyne and Wear
- Ambulance: North East
- UK Parliament: Newcastle upon Tyne Central

Blakelaw and North Fenham is a civil parish in the City of Newcastle upon Tyne in Tyne and Wear, England. It is north west of the city centre, and is entirely surrounded by the unparished area of Newcastle upon Tyne. It covers the areas of Blakelaw, Cowgate and North Fenham, and has a population of 6,468, decreasing slightly to 6,452 at the 2011 Census.
