= Stonebow Village =

Civil parish in Leicestershire, England

Coordinates: 52.777°N 1.265°W

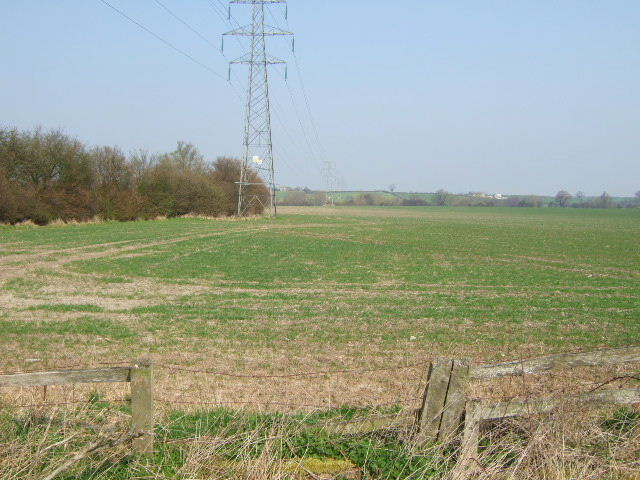

- Location within Leicestershire
- Population: 9 (2021 census)
- Civil parish: Stonebow Village
- District: Charnwood
- Shire county: Leicestershire
- Region: East Midlands
- Country: England
- Sovereign state: United Kingdom
- Police: Leicestershire
- Fire: Leicestershire
- Ambulance: East Midlands

Stonebow Village is a civil parish in Borough of Charnwood, Leicestershire, England. In 2021 the parish had a population of 9.

The parish was created on 1 April 2019, from parts of the parishes of Shepshed and Hathern and part of the unparished area of Loughborough. It is bordered to the west by the parish of Shepshed (the M1 motorway forming the boundary), to the north by Hathern, and to the east and south by Loughborough.

The Garendon Park Development, also known as the West of Loughborough Sustainable Urban Extension, is a proposed development of 3,200 houses, with associated shopping facilities, schools, sporting facilities and employment areas, in the parish. It received outline planning permission in July 2018, and as of 2024 is being marketed by its developers under the name Garendon Country Park.

As of October 2024 there are 13 listed buildings (the Triumphal Arch at grade I, the Temple of Venus at grade II* and 11 at grade I), one listed park and garden (Garendon at grade II), and one scheduled monument (the remains of the Cistercian Garendon Abbey) in the parish. All are within Garendon Park, the grounds of the former Garendon Hall.

The highest point in the parish is Bellevue Hill at 68 m (223 ft), in the north, which has been described as "offer[ing] stunning panoramic views of the surrounding countryside".

Stonebow Primary School, despite its name, is not in the parish of Stonebow Village but is in an adjacent unparished area of Loughborough.
