= Dene Valley =

Civil parish in County Durham, England

Coordinates: 54.65°N 1.6517°W

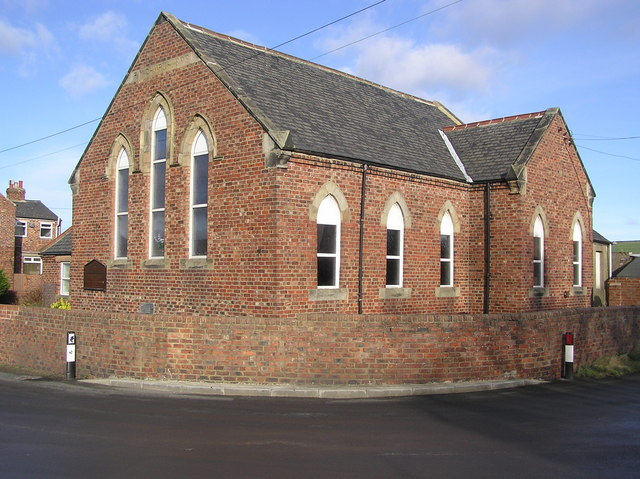

- Location within County Durham
- Population: 2,478 (2011)
- Civil parish: Dene Valley
- Unitary authority: County Durham
- Ceremonial county: County Durham
- Region: North East
- Country: England
- Sovereign state: United Kingdom
- Post town: Bishop Auckland
- Postcode district: DL 14
- Police: Durham
- Fire: County Durham and Darlington
- Ambulance: North East
- UK Parliament: Bishop Auckland

Dene Valley is a civil parish in County Durham, England. It had a population of 2,478 at the 2011 Census.
