= Orrell Urban District =

Former local government area in the UK

Coordinates: 53°32′N 2°43′W

- Area
  - 1894: 1,617 acres (6.54 km^{2})
  - 1974: 1,615 acres (6.53 km^{2})
- Population
  - 1911: 6,318
  - 1971: 12,075
- History
  - Created: 1894
  - Abolished: 1974
  - Succeeded by: Metropolitan Borough of Wigan
- Status: Urban district

Orrell Urban District was, from 1894 to 1974, a local government district in the administrative county of Lancashire, England. Its boundaries were centred on Orrell, but also included parts of Upholland.

The district covered a significant area to the west of the County Borough of Wigan.

The Urban District was created by the Local Government Act 1894. In 1974 Orrell Urban District was abolished by the Local Government Act 1972 and most its former territories transferred to Greater Manchester to form part of the Metropolitan Borough of Wigan (the rest being transferred to West Lancashire).
