= Sittingbourne and Milton Urban District =

Former urban district of Kent, England

Coordinates: 51°21′00″N 0°43′57″E

Sittingbourne and Milton
- Urban District
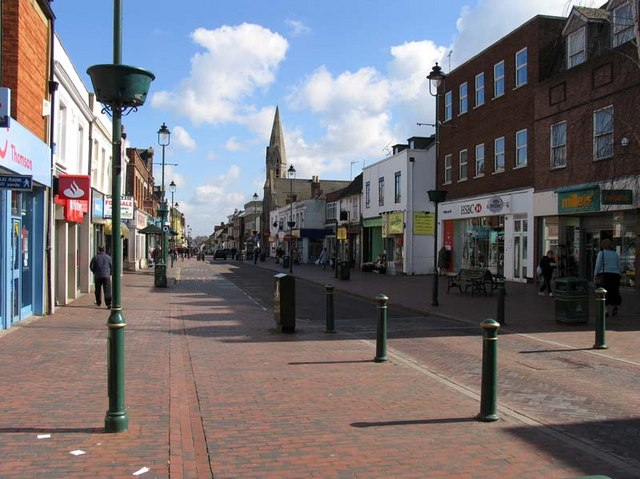
- Population
  - 1961: 23,623
- History
  - Created: 1930
  - Abolished: 31 March 1974
  - Succeeded by: Swale
- Contained within
  - County: Kent

Sittingbourne and Milton was an urban district in Kent, England, consisting of the settlements of Sittingbourne and Milton Regis. It was abolished in 1974 under the Local Government Act 1972, and made part of the Swale district.
