= Ramsbottom Urban District =

Former local government area in the UK

Coordinates: 53°40′N 2°20′W

- History
  - Created: 1894
  - Abolished: 1974
  - Succeeded by: Metropolitan Borough of Bury and Rossendale Borough
- Status: Urban district

Ramsbottom Urban District was, from 1894 to 1974, a local government district of the administrative county of Lancashire, England. Its area was coterminate with Ramsbottom, spanning an area of the Rossendale Valley north of the County Borough of Bury.

The Urban District was created by the Local Government Act 1894, and abolished by the Local Government Act 1972; in 1974 the Central, East, South and West wards of the district joined the Metropolitan Borough of Bury, the North and Walmersley cum Shuttleworth wards to the Borough of Rossendale.
