= Wintersett =

Village and civil parish in West Yorkshire, England

Coordinates: 53.636751°N 1.422331°W

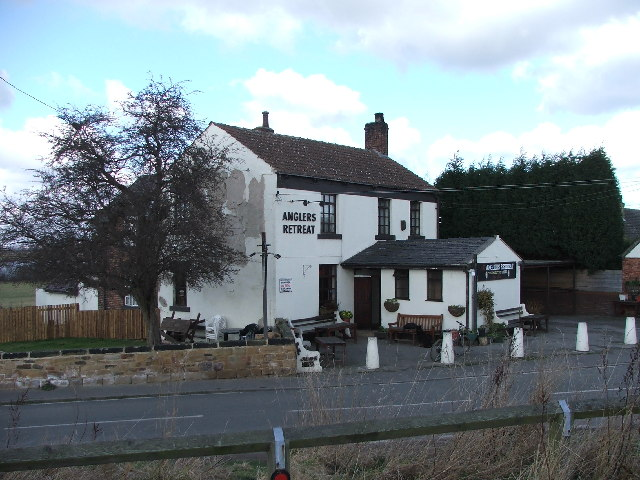
- The Anglers Retreat, Wintersett

- Location within West Yorkshire
- Population: 50 (2001 census)
- Metropolitan borough: City of Wakefield
- Metropolitan county: West Yorkshire
- Region: Yorkshire and the Humber
- Country: England
- Sovereign state: United Kingdom
- Post town: WAKEFIELD
- Postcode district: WF4
- Dialling code: 01924
- Police: West Yorkshire
- Fire: West Yorkshire
- Ambulance: Yorkshire
- UK Parliament: Hemsworth

Wintersett is a hamlet in the Wakefield district, in West Yorkshire, England. At the 2001 census the population of the parish was 50. Until 1974 it formed part of Wakefield Rural District in the West Riding of Yorkshire. It gives its name to the nearby Wintersett Reservoir.

In 2013 "Wintersett Lakes Caravan site" opened at the rear of The Anglers Retreat public house, offering electric hookup standings at a location near to Anglers Country Park.

Wintersett was formerly a township in the parish of Wragby. In 1866 Wintersett became a separate civil parish, and on 1 April 2023 the parish was abolished.
