= Finstall =

Coordinates: 52.329543°N 2.029252°W

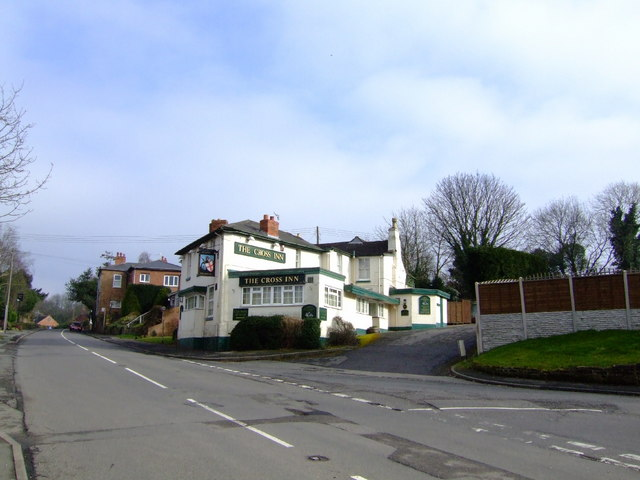

- Location within Worcestershire
- Population: 663
- Civil parish: Finstall
- District: Bromsgrove
- Shire county: Worcestershire
- Region: West Midlands
- Country: England
- Sovereign state: United Kingdom
- Post town: BROMSGROVE
- Postcode district: B60
- Dialling code: 01527

Finstall is a village and civil parish in the Bromsgrove District of Worcestershire, England, with a population of 663.

Finstall Park, the home ground of Bromsgrove RFC, can be found in the village along with Bromsgrove Cricket, Tennis and Hockey Clubs, as well as their corresponding sporting facilities and club houses. It has one pub, The Cross Inn.
