= County Borough of Barnsley =

Administrative division of Yorkshire, England until 1974

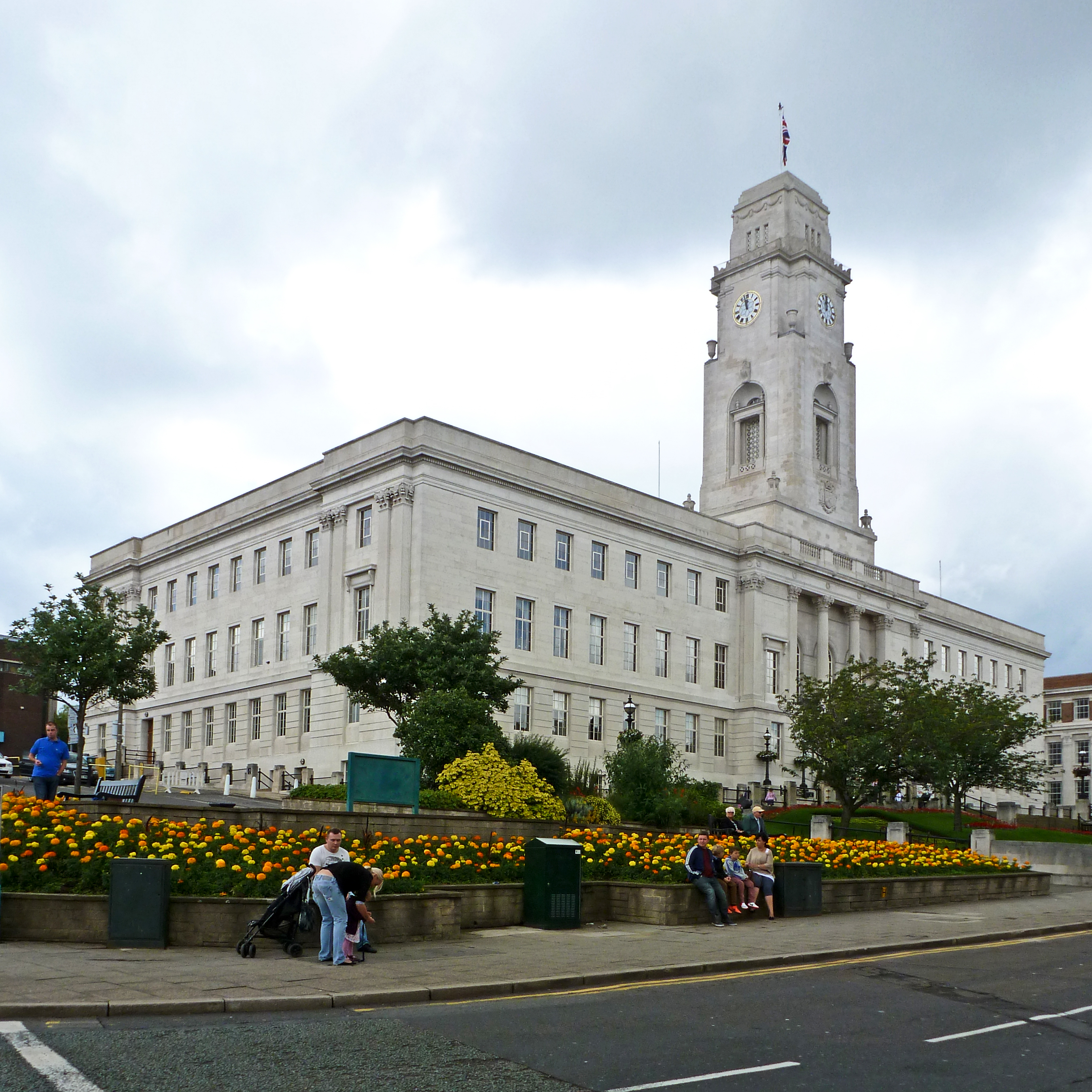
- Barnsley Town Hall
- Area
  - 1911: 2,385 acres (965 ha)
  - 1931: 6,036 acres (2,443 ha)
  - 1961: 7,817 acres (3,163 ha)
- Population
  - 1911: 50,614
  - 1931: 71,522
  - 1961: 74,704
- Density
  - 1911: 21/acre
  - 1931: 12/acre
  - 1961: 10/acre
- History
  - Created: 1869
  - Abolished: 1974
  - Succeeded by: Metropolitan Borough of Barnsley
- Status: Municipal borough (1869–1913); County borough (1913–1974)
  - HQ: Barnsley
- Map of boundary as of 1971

The County Borough of Barnsley, and its predecessor, the Municipal Borough of Barnsley, was a local government district in the West Riding of Yorkshire, England, from 1869 to 1974.

Barnsley became a municipal borough in 1869, and a county borough in 1913, making it administratively independent of the West Riding County Council. The borough's boundaries were extended to absorb Ardsley and Monk Bretton in 1921 and Carlton in 1938.

Barnsley Town Hall was opened on 14 December 1933 as the seat of local government. The Classical Portland stone building was designed by Sir Arnold Thornely and is Grade II listed.

The borough was abolished under the Local Government Act 1972, and created the centre of the new Metropolitan Borough of Barnsley by a merger with Cudworth, Darfield, Darton, Dearne, Dodworth, Hoyland Nether, Penistone, Royston, Wombwell and Worsborough urban districts, along with Penistone Rural District, part of Hemsworth Rural District and part of Wortley Rural District, all in the West Riding of Yorkshire.

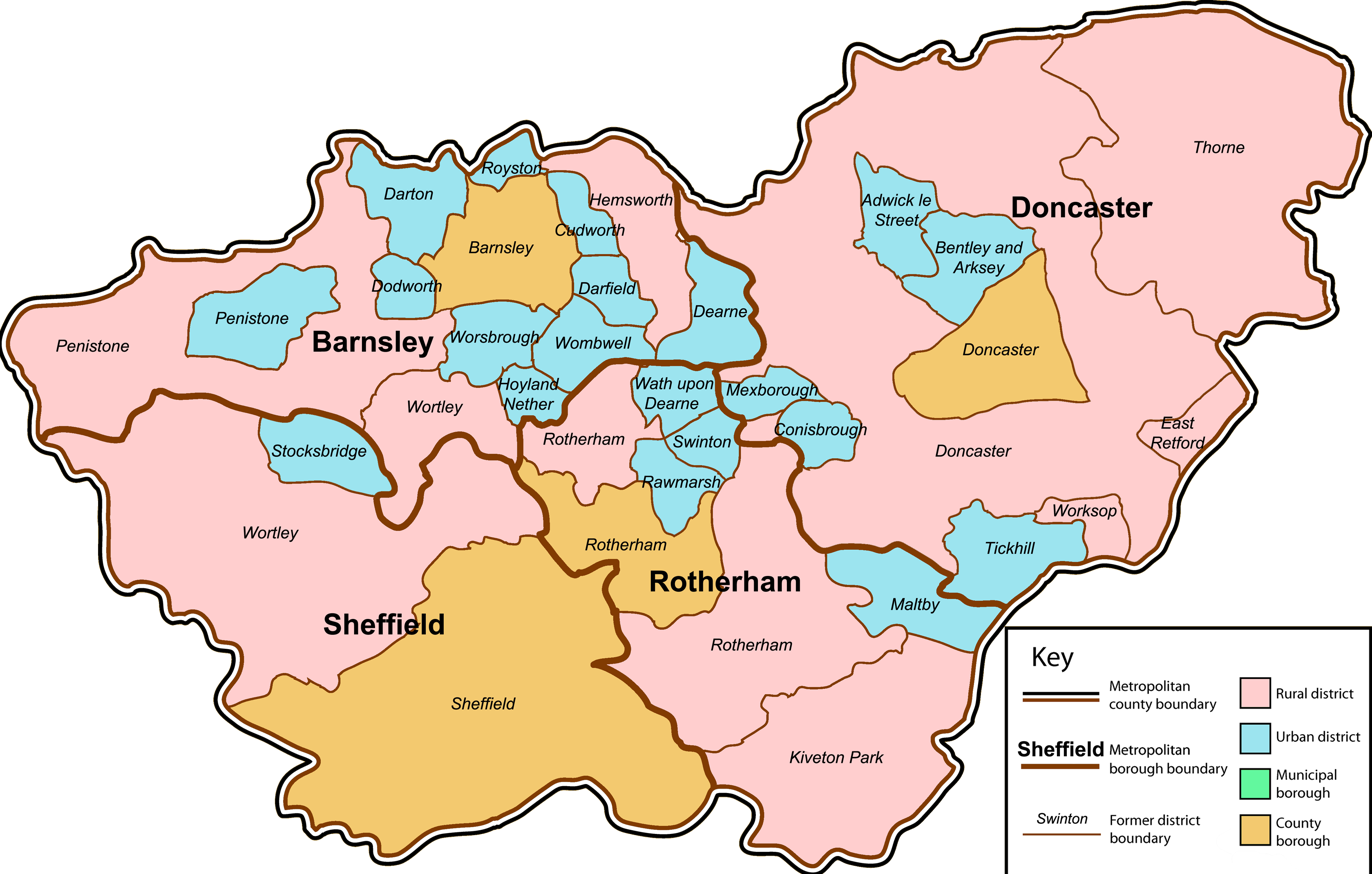
The surrounding pre-1974 districts which now make up South Yorkshire
