= List of urban districts formed in England and Wales 1894–95 =

Urban districts were a form of local government in England and Wales between 1894 and 1974, typically used for smaller and medium sized towns. They were created on 31 December 1894 under the Local Government Act 1894 (56 & 57 Vict. c. 73). The vast majority of urban districts formed at that time were created by renaming the pre-existing urban sanitary districts, such as local board districts or improvement commissioners districts. Only a minority of the urban districts created in 1894 were for places that had not previously had urban forms of local government.

Other, usually larger, towns and cities were governed as municipal boroughs.
Note for table: 'UD' stands for Urban District, 'RD' stands for Rural District, 'MB' stands for Municipal Borough, 'Met. B' stands for Metropolitan Borough and 'CB' stands for County Borough.

== 1894 ==
Initially 753 urban districts were created under the Local Government Act 1894 (56 & 57 Vict. c. 73). Of these, 692 had previously been local board districts or local government districts, and 30 had been improvement commissioners districts. (Note: This list published in 1894 appears to show the position part way through 1893. It lists 239 municipal boroughs, 30 improvement act districts (excluding Folkestone, which was anomalously both a borough and an improvement act district) and 696 local government districts. There were a small number of changes during 1893 and 1894 after this list was compiled and before the major changes brought about by the 1894 Act: Brighouse and Whitehaven were elevated from local government districts to boroughs, the local government districts of Howdon, Leckhampton and Rastrick were abolished, and new local government districts were created for Alsager, Buckfastleigh, Cockington, Woking and Woodbridge. As such, there were 241 municipal boroughs, 30 improvement act districts and 696 local government districts immediately prior to the 1894 Act coming into force.) When the 1894 Act came into force on 31 December 1894 an additional 31 urban districts were created for areas which had not previously been urban sanitary districts, whilst four urban sanitary districts were abolished at the same time (two absorbed into larger urban neighbours, two downgraded to rural areas) and so did not become urban districts. (Note: The 31 newly created urban districts were Bromyard, Brumby and Frodingham, Buckhurst Hill, Carnforth, Chertsey, Chingford, Crewkerne, Erdington, Finedon, Frimley, Golborne, Greenford, Hoddesdon, Irlam, Leatherhead, Ledbury, Machynlleth, Nailsworth, Perry Barr, South Shoebury, Sunbury, Urmston, Walton-on-Thames, Warblington, Wealdstone, Weetslade, Wembley, Weybridge, Whitstable, Wigston Magna, and Worsley. The four local government districts that did not become urban districts were Bisley (transferred to Stroud Rural District), South Cave and Wallingfen (split between Beverley Rural District and Howden Rural District), Austonley (absorbed into Holmfirth UD) and Cumberworth (merged with Denby to form Denby and Cumberworth).)

=== Abolished before 1974 ===
Urban District	County	Abolished	Successor(s)
Leighton Buzzard UD	Bedfordshire	1965	Leighton-Linslade UD
Aylesbury UD	Buckinghamshire	1917	Aylesbury MB
Slough UD	Buckinghamshire	1938	Slough MB
Chesterton UD	Cambridgeshire	1912	absorbed by Cambridge MB
Llanelly UD	Carmarthenshire	1913	Llanelly MB
Altrincham UD	Cheshire	1937	Altrincham MB
Bromborough UD	Cheshire	1922	Bebington and Bromborough UD
Buglawton UD	Cheshire	1936	absorbed by Congleton MB and Macclesfield RD
Dukinfield UD	Cheshire	1899	Dukinfield MB
Higher Bebington UD	Cheshire	1922	Bebington and Bromborough UD
Hollingworth UD	Cheshire	1936	absorbed by Longdendale UD
Hoole UD	Cheshire	1954	absorbed by Chester CB and Chester RD
Lower Bebington UD	Cheshire	1922	Bebington and Bromborough UD
Sale UD	Cheshire	1935	Sale MB
Tarporley UD	Cheshire	1936	absorbed by Northwich RD
Wallasey UD	Cheshire	1910	Wallasey MB
Yeardsley cum Whaley UD	Cheshire	1936	absorbed by Whaley Bridge UD, Derbyshire and Disley RD
Camborne UD	Cornwall	1934	Camborne-Redruth UD
Hayle UD	Cornwall	1934	absorbed by West Penwith RD
Ludgvan UD	Cornwall	1934	absorbed by West Penwith RD
Madron UD	Cornwall	1934	absorbed by Penzance MB and West Penwith RD
Padstow UD	Cornwall	1968	Wadebridge and Padstow RD
Paul UD	Cornwall	1934	absorbed by Penzance MB and West Penwith RD
Phillack UD	Cornwall	1934	absorbed by West Penwith RD
Redruth UD	Cornwall	1934	Camborne-Redruth UD
St Austell UD	Cornwall	1968	St Austell with Fowey MB
Benfieldside UD	County Durham	1937	absorbed by Consett UD
Leadgate UD	County Durham	1937	absorbed by Consett UD and Stanley UD
Southwick on Wear UD	County Durham	1928	absorbed by Sunderland CB
Stanhope UD	County Durham	1937	absorbed by Weardale RD
Willington UD	County Durham	1937	Crook and Willington UD
Arlecdon and Frizington UD	Cumberland	1934	Ennerdale RD
Aspatria UD	Cumberland	1934	absorbed by Cockermouth RD and Wigton RD
Cleator Moor UD	Cumberland	1934	Ennerdale RD
Egremont UD	Cumberland	1934	Ennerdale RD
Harrington UD	Cumberland	1934	absorbed by Ennerdale RD and Workington MB
Holme Cultram UD	Cumberland	1934	absorbed by Wigton RD
Millom UD	Cumberland	1934	Millom RD
Wigton UD	Cumberland	1934	absorbed by Wigton RD
Colwyn Bay and Colwyn UD (1894-1926), Colwyn Bay UD (1926–34)	Denbighshire	1934	Colwyn Bay MB
Abergele and Pensarn UD	Denbighshire	1935	Abergele UD
Alvaston and Boulton UD	Derbyshire	1934	absorbed by Shardlow RD
Baslow and Bubnell UD	Derbyshire	1934	absorbed by Bakewell RD
Bonsall UD	Derbyshire	1935	Matlock UD
Brampton and Walton UD	Derbyshire	1935	absorbed by Chesterfield RD
Buxton UD	Derbyshire	1917	Buxton MB
Fairfield UD	Derbyshire	1917	Buxton MB
Heage UD	Derbyshire	1934	absorbed by Ripley UD
Matlock Bath and Scarthin Nick UD	Derbyshire	1924	The Matlocks UD
Newbold and Dunston UD	Derbyshire	1911	Whittington and Newbold UD
North Darley UD	Derbyshire	1934	absorbed by Matlock UD
South Darley UD	Derbyshire	1934	absorbed by Matlock UD
Whittington UD	Derbyshire	1911	Whittington and Newbold UD
Bampton UD	Devon	1935	absorbed by Tiverton RD
Cockington UD	Devon	1900	absorbed by Newton Abbot RD
Compton Gifford UD	Devon	1896	absorbed by Plympton St Mary RD
East Stonehouse UD	Devon	1914	absorbed by Plymouth CB
Ivybridge UD	Devon	1935	absorbed by Plympton St Mary RD
Lower Brixham UD (1894–95), Brixham UD (1895-1968)	Devon	1968	Torbay CB
Paignton UD	Devon	1968	Torbay CB
St Mary Church UD	Devon	1900	absorbed by Torquay MB
St Thomas the Apostle UD	Devon	1900	absorbed by Exeter CB
Branksome UD	Dorset	1905	absorbed by Poole MB
Bridlington UD	East Riding of Yorkshire	1899	Bridlington MB
Cottingham UD	East Riding of Yorkshire	1935	Haltemprice UD, absorbed by Beverley RD and Kingston upon Hull CB
Pocklington UD	East Riding of Yorkshire	1935	absorbed by Pocklington RD
Battle UD	East Sussex	1934	absorbed by Battle RD
Bexhill UD	East Sussex	1902	Bexhill MB
Haywards Heath UD	East Sussex	1934	absorbed by Cuckfield UD
Hove UD	East Sussex	1898	Hove MB
Uckfield UD	East Sussex	1934	absorbed by Uckfield RD
Barking Town UD	Essex	1931	Barking MB
Buckhurst Hill UD	Essex	1933	Chigwell UD
Chingford UD	Essex	1938	Chingford MB
East Ham UD	Essex	1904	East Ham MB
Grays Thurrock UD	Essex	1936	Thurrock UD
Ilford UD	Essex	1926	Ilford MB
Leyton UD	Essex	1926	Leyton MB
Romford UD	Essex	1937	Romford MB
Shoeburyness UD, South Shoebury (1894–1895)	Essex	1933	absorbed by Southend on Sea CB
Walthamstow UD	Essex	1929	Walthamstow MB
Walton-on-the-Naze UD	Essex	1934	Frinton and Walton UD
Wanstead UD	Essex	1934	Wanstead and Woodford UD
Woodford UD	Essex	1934	Wanstead and Woodford UD
Barry UD	Glamorgan	1938	Barry MB
Briton Ferry UD	Glamorgan	1922	absorbed by Neath MB
Margam UD	Glamorgan	1921	Port Talbot MB
Merthyr Tydfil UD	Glamorgan	1905	Merthyr Tydfil MB
Oystermouth UD	Glamorgan	1918	absorbed by Swansea CB
Rhondda UD, Ystradyfodwg UD (1894–1897)	Glamorgan	1955	Rhondda MB
Awre UD	Gloucestershire	1935	absorbed by East Dean RD and West Dean RD
Coleford UD	Gloucestershire	1935	absorbed by West Dean RD
Horfield UD	Gloucestershire	1904	absorbed by Bristol CB
Newnham UD	Gloucestershire	1935	absorbed by Gloucester RD
Stapleton UD	Gloucestershire	1898	absorbed by Bristol CB
Stow on the Wold UD	Gloucestershire	1935	North Cotswold RD
St George UD	Gloucestershire	1898	absorbed by Bristol CB
Tetbury UD	Gloucestershire	1935	absorbed by Tetbury RD
Westbury on Severn UD	Gloucestershire	1935	absorbed by Gloucester RD
Aldershot UD	Hampshire	1922	Aldershot MB
Eastleigh UD (1894–99), Eastleigh and Bishopstoke UD (1899-1932), Eastleigh UD (1932–36)	Hampshire	1936	Eastleigh MB
Gosport and Alverstoke UD	Hampshire	1922	Gosport MB
Shirley and Freemantle UD	Hampshire	1895	absorbed by Southampton CB
Warblington UD	Hampshire	1932	absorbed by Havant and Waterloo UD and Petersfield RD
Bromyard UD	Herefordshire	1968	absorbed by Bromyard RD
Ledbury UD	Herefordshire	1968	absorbed by Ledbury RD
Barnet UD	Hertfordshire	1965	Barnet
East Barnet Valley UD (1894-1935), East Barnet UD (1935–65)	Hertfordshire	1965	Barnet
Watford UD	Hertfordshire	1922	Watford MB
East Cowes UD	Isle of Wight	1933	absorbed by Cowes UD
Sandown UD	Isle of Wight	1933	Sandown-Shanklin UD
Shanklin UD	Isle of Wight	1933	Sandown-Shanklin UD
St Helens UD	Isle of Wight	1933	absorbed by Ryde MB
Beckenham UD	Kent	1935	Beckenham MB
Bexley UD	Kent	1937	Bexley MB
Bromley UD	Kent	1903	Bromley MB
Dartford UD	Kent	1933	Dartford MB
Erith UD	Kent	1938	Erith MB
Gillingham UD	Kent	1903	Gillingham MB
Milton next Sittingbourne UD (1894-1907), Milton Regis UD (1907–30)	Kent	1930	Sittingbourne and Milton UD
Sandgate UD	Kent	1934	absorbed by Folkestone MB and Hythe MB
Sheerness UD	Kent	1968	absorbed by Queenborough-in-Sheppey MB
Sittingbourne UD	Kent	1930	Sittingbourne and Milton UD
Walmer UD	Kent	1935	absorbed by Deal MB
Wrotham UD	Kent	1934	absorbed by Dartford RD and Malling RD
Allerton UD	Lancashire	1913	absorbed by Liverpool CB
Astley Bridge UD	Lancashire	1898	absorbed by Bolton CB
Birkdale UD	Lancashire	1912	absorbed by Southport CB
Castleton by Rochdale UD	Lancashire	1900	absorbed by Rochdale CB
Childwall UD	Lancashire	1913	absorbed by Liverpool CB
Colne UD	Lancashire	1895	Colne MB
Croston UD	Lancashire	1934	absorbed by Chorley RD
Farnworth UD	Lancashire	1939	Farnworth MB
Fleetwood UD	Lancashire	1933	Fleetwood MB
Garston UD	Lancashire	1902	absorbed by Liverpool CB
Gorton UD	Lancashire	1909	absorbed by Manchester CB
Great Crosby UD	Lancashire	1937	Crosby MB
Heaton Norris UD	Lancashire	1913	absorbed by Stockport CB
Hurst UD	Lancashire	1927	absorbed by Ashton under Lyne MB
Lathom and Burscough UD	Lancashire	1931	absorbed by Ormskirk UD
Leigh UD	Lancashire	1899	Leigh MB
Levenshulme UD	Lancashire	1909	absorbed by Manchester CB
Little Crosby UD	Lancashire	1932	absorbed by Great Crosby UD
Little Hulton UD	Lancashire	1933	absorbed by Worsley UD
Little Woolton UD	Lancashire	1913	absorbed by Liverpool CB
Lytham UD	Lancashire	1922	Lytham St Annes MB
Morecambe UD	Lancashire	1902	Morecambe MB
Moss Side UD	Lancashire	1904	absorbed by Manchester CB
Much Woolton UD	Lancashire	1913	absorbed by Liverpool CB
Norden UD	Lancashire	1933	absorbed by Heywood MB and Rochdale CB
Pemberton UD	Lancashire	1904	absorbed by Wigan CB
Prestwich UD	Lancashire	1939	Prestwich MB
Radcliffe UD	Lancashire	1935	Radcliffe MB
Reddish UD	Lancashire	1901	absorbed by Stockport CB
Stretford UD	Lancashire	1933	Stretford MB
St Annes on the Sea UD	Lancashire	1922	Lytham St Annes MB
Swinton and Pendlebury UD	Lancashire	1934	Swinton and Pendlebury MB
Toxteth Park UD	Lancashire	1895	absorbed by Liverpool CB
Upholland UD	Lancashire	1968	Skelmersdale and Holland UD
Walton on the Hill UD	Lancashire	1895	absorbed by Liverpool CB
Waterloo with Seaforth UD	Lancashire	1937	Crosby MB
Wavertree UD	Lancashire	1895	absorbed by Liverpool CB
West Derby UD	Lancashire	1895	absorbed by Liverpool CB
Withington UD	Lancashire	1904	absorbed by Manchester CB
Quorndon UD	Leicestershire	1935	absorbed by Loughborough MB
Thurmaston UD	Leicestershire	1935	absorbed by Leicester CB
Holbeach UD	Lincolnshire, Parts of Holland	1932	absorbed by East Elloe RD
Long Sutton UD	Lincolnshire, Parts of Holland	1932	absorbed by East Elloe RD
Sutton Bridge UD	Lincolnshire, Parts of Holland	1932	absorbed by East Elloe RD
Ruskington UD	Lincolnshire, Parts of Kesteven	1931	absorbed by East Kesteven RD
Broughton UD	Lincolnshire, Parts of Lindsey	1923	absorbed by Glanford Brigg RD
Brumby and Frodingham UD	Lincolnshire, Parts of Lindsey	1919	absorbed by Scunthorpe UD
Cleethorpe with Thrunscoe (1894-1916), Cleethorpes UD (1916–36)	Lincolnshire, Parts of Lindsey	1936	Cleethorpes MB
Crowle UD	Lincolnshire, Parts of Lindsey	1936	absorbed by Isle of Axholme RD
Roxby cum Risby UD	Lincolnshire, Parts of Lindsey	1936	absorbed by Glanford Brigg RD
Scunthorpe UD (1894-1919), Scunthorpe and Frodingham UD (1919–36)	Lincolnshire, Parts of Lindsey	1936	Scunthorpe MB
Winterton UD	Lincolnshire, Parts of Lindsey	1936	absorbed by Glanford Brigg RD
Acton UD	Middlesex	1921	Acton MB
Brentford UD	Middlesex	1927	Brentford and Chiswick UD
Chiswick UD	Middlesex	1927	Brentford and Chiswick UD
Ealing UD	Middlesex	1901	Ealing MB
Edmonton UD	Middlesex	1937	Edmonton MB
Enfield UD	Middlesex	1955	Enfield MB
Finchley UD	Middlesex	1933	Finchley MB
Friern Barnet UD	Middlesex	1965	Barnet
Greenford UD	Middlesex	1926	absorbed by Ealing MB
Hampton UD	Middlesex	1937	absorbed by Twickenham MB
Hampton Wick UD	Middlesex	1937	absorbed by Twickenham MB
Hanwell UD	Middlesex	1926	absorbed by Ealing MB
Harrow on the Hill UD (1894-1934), Harrow UD (1934–54)	Middlesex	1954	Harrow MB
Hendon UD	Middlesex	1932	Hendon MB
Heston and Isleworth UD	Middlesex	1932	Heston and Isleworth MB
Hornsey UD	Middlesex	1903	Hornsey MB
South Hornsey UD	Middlesex	1900	Islington Met. B, Stoke Newington Met. B
Southall Norwood UD	Middlesex	1936	Southall MB
Southgate UD	Middlesex	1933	Southgate MB
Teddington UD	Middlesex	1937	absorbed by Twickenham MB
Tottenham UD	Middlesex	1934	Tottenham MB
Twickenham UD	Middlesex	1926	Twickenham MB
Uxbridge UD	Middlesex	1955	Uxbridge MB
Wealdstone UD	Middlesex	1934	absorbed by Harrow UD
Wembley UD	Middlesex	1937	Wembley MB
Willesden UD	Middlesex	1933	Willesden MB
Wood Green UD	Middlesex	1933	Wood Green MB
Abergavenny UD	Monmouthshire	1899	Abergavenny MB
Abersychan UD	Monmouthshire	1935	Abercarn UD, absorbed by Pontypool UD
Llanfrechfa Upper UD	Monmouthshire	1935	Cwmbran UD
Llantarnam UD	Monmouthshire	1935	Cwmbran UD, absorbed by Caerleon UD
Panteg UD	Monmouthshire	1935	absorbed by Pontypool UD
Walsoken UD	Norfolk	1934	absorbed by Wisbech RD and Wisbech MB
Eston UD	North Riding of Yorkshire	1968	Teesside CB, absorbed by Guisborough UD
Hinderwell UD	North Riding of Yorkshire	1932	absorbed by Whitby RD
Kirkleatham UD	North Riding of Yorkshire	1899	absorbed by Redcar UD
Kirklington cum Upsland UD	North Riding of Yorkshire	1934	absorbed by Bedale RD
Masham UD	North Riding of Yorkshire	1934	Masham RD
Ormesby UD	North Riding of Yorkshire	1913	absorbed by Middlesbrough CB and Middlesbrough RD
Redcar UD	North Riding of Yorkshire	1921	Redcar MB
Saltburn by the Sea UD	North Riding of Yorkshire	1932	Saltburn and Marske-by-the-Sea UD
South Bank in Normanby UD	North Riding of Yorkshire	1915	absorbed by Eston UD
Finedon UD	Northamptonshire	1935	absorbed by Wellingborough UD
Hardingstone UD	Northamptonshire	1896	Far Cotton UD and St James UD
Kettering UD	Northamptonshire	1938	Kettering MB
Kingsthorpe UD	Northamptonshire	1900	absorbed by Northampton CB
Benwell and Fenham UD	Northumberland	1904	absorbed by Newcastle upon Tyne CB
Cowpen UD	Northumberland	1907	absorbed by Blyth UD
Cramlington UD	Northumberland	1935	Seaton Valley UD
Seghill UD	Northumberland	1935	Seaton Valley UD
South Blyth UD (1894-1900), Blyth UD (1900-1922)	Northumberland	1922	Blyth MB
Walker UD	Northumberland	1904	absorbed by Newcastle upon Tyne CB
Wallsend UD	Northumberland	1901	Wallsend MB
Weetslade UD	Northumberland	1935	absorbed by Longbenton UD
Whitley and Monkseaton UD (1894-1944), Whitley Bay UD (1944–54)	Northumberland	1954	Whitley Bay MB
Willington Quay UD	Northumberland	1910	absorbed by Wallsend MB
Beeston UD	Nottinghamshire	1935	Beeston and Stapleford UD
Hucknall under Huthwaite UD (1894-1907), Huthwaite UD (1907–35)	Nottinghamshire	1935	absorbed by Sutton in Ashfield UD
Worksop UD	Nottinghamshire	1931	Worksop MB
Caversham UD	Oxfordshire	1911	absorbed by Reading CB
Wheatley UD	Oxfordshire	1932	Bullingdon RD
Ellesmere UD	Shropshire	1967	North Shropshire RD
Whitchurch and Dodington UD (1894–95), Whitchurch UD (1895-1967)	Shropshire	1967	North Shropshire RD
Midsomer Norton UD	Somerset	1933	Norton-Radstock UD, absorbed by Clutton RD and Shepton Mallet RD
Radstock UD	Somerset	1933	Norton-Radstock UD
Weston-super-Mare UD	Somerset	1937	Weston-super-Mare MB
Wiveliscombe UD	Somerset	1933	absorbed by Wellington RD
Audley UD	Staffordshire	1932	absorbed by Newcastle-under-Lyme MB, Newcastle-under-Lyme RD and Kidsgrove UD
Bilston UD	Staffordshire	1933	Bilston MB
Brierley Hill UD	Staffordshire	1966	absorbed by Dudley CB, Seisdon RD, Stourbridge MB and Warley CB
Brownhills UD	Staffordshire	1966	Aldridge-Brownhills UD, absorbed by Cannock UD and Lichfield RD
Coseley UD	Staffordshire	1966	absorbed by Dudley CB, Walsall CB, West Bromwich CB and Wolverhampton CB
Darlaston UD	Staffordshire	1966	absorbed by Walsall CB and Wolverhampton CB
Fenton UD	Staffordshire	1910	absorbed by Stoke on Trent CB
Handsworth UD	Staffordshire	1911	absorbed by Birmingham CB
Perry Barr UD	Staffordshire	1928	absorbed by Birmingham CB, Sutton Coldfield MB and West Bromwich CB
Quarry Bank UD	Staffordshire	1934	absorbed by Brierley Hill UD
Rowley Regis UD	Staffordshire	1933	Rowley Regis MB
Sedgley UD	Staffordshire	1966	absorbed by Dudley CB, Seisdon RD and Wolverhampton CB
Short Heath UD	Staffordshire	1934	absorbed by Willenhall UD
Smallthorne UD	Staffordshire	1922	absorbed by Stoke on Trent CB
Smethwick UD	Staffordshire	1899	Smethwick MB
Tettenhall UD	Staffordshire	1966	absorbed by Seisdon RD and Wolverhampton CB
Tipton UD	Staffordshire	1938	Tipton MB
Tunstall UD	Staffordshire	1910	absorbed by Stoke on Trent CB
Wednesfield UD	Staffordshire	1966	absorbed by Cannock RD, Walsall CB and Wolverhampton CB
Wednesfield Heath UD, Heath Town UD	Staffordshire	1927	absorbed by Wolverhampton CB
Willenhall UD	Staffordshire	1966	absorbed by Cannock RD, Walsall CB and Wolverhampton CB
Barnes UD	Surrey	1932	Barnes MB
Carshalton UD	Surrey	1965	Sutton
East Molesey UD (1894–95), East and West Molesey UD (1895-1933)	Surrey	1933	absorbed by Esher UD
Epsom UD (1894-1934), Epsom and Ewell UD (1934–37)	Surrey	1937	Epsom and Ewell MB
Ham UD	Surrey	1933	absorbed by Kingston-upon-Thames MB and Richmond MB
New Malden UD (1894–95), The Maldens and Coombe UD (1895-1936), Malden and Coombe UD (1936)	Surrey	1936	Malden and Coombe MB
Surbiton UD	Surrey	1936	Surbiton MB
Sutton UD (1894-1928), Sutton and Cheam UD (1928–74)	Surrey	1934	Sutton and Cheam MB
Walton upon Thames UD	Surrey	1933	Walton and Weybridge UD
Weybridge UD	Surrey	1933	Walton and Weybridge UD
Wimbledon UD	Surrey	1905	Wimbledon MB
Aston Manor UD	Warwickshire	1903	Aston Manor MB
Bulkington UD	Warwickshire	1932	absorbed by Rugby RD
Erdington UD	Warwickshire	1911	absorbed by Birmingham CB
Nuneaton and Chilvers Coton UD	Warwickshire	1907	Nuneaton MB
Rugby UD	Warwickshire	1932	Rugby MB
Altofts UD	West Riding of Yorkshire	1938	absorbed by Normanton UD
Ardsley UD	West Riding of Yorkshire	1921	absorbed by Barnsley CB
Barkisland UD	West Riding of Yorkshire	1937	Ripponden UD
Bingley Outer UD	West Riding of Yorkshire	1898	absorbed by Bingley UD
Birkenshaw UD	West Riding of Yorkshire	1937	absorbed by Spenborough UD
Birstall UD	West Riding of Yorkshire	1937	absorbed by Batley MB
Burley in Wharfedale UD	West Riding of Yorkshire	1937	absorbed by Ilkley UD
Calverley UD	West Riding of Yorkshire	1937	absorbed by Pudsey MB
Castleford UD	West Riding of Yorkshire	1955	Castleford MB
Clayton UD	West Riding of Yorkshire	1930	absorbed by Bradford CB
Clayton West UD	West Riding of Yorkshire	1938	Denby Dale UD
Cleckheaton UD	West Riding of Yorkshire	1915	Spenborough UD
Denby and Cumberworth UD	West Riding of Yorkshire	1938	Denby Dale UD
Drighlington UD	West Riding of Yorkshire	1937	absorbed by Morley MB
Eccleshill UD	West Riding of Yorkshire	1899	absorbed by Bradford CB
Emley UD	West Riding of Yorkshire	1938	Denby Dale UD
Farnley Tyas UD	West Riding of Yorkshire	1925	Thurstonland and Farnley Tyas UD
Farsley UD	West Riding of Yorkshire	1937	absorbed by Pudsey MB
Flockton UD	West Riding of Yorkshire	1938	absorbed by Kirkburton UD
Fulstone UD	West Riding of Yorkshire	1895	New Mill UD
Gildersome UD	West Riding of Yorkshire	1937	absorbed by Morley MB
Golcar UD	West Riding of Yorkshire	1937	Colne Valley UD, absorbed by Huddersfield CB
Gomersal UD	West Riding of Yorkshire	1915	Spenborough UD
Goole UD	West Riding of Yorkshire	1933	Goole MB
Greasborough UD	West Riding of Yorkshire	1936	absorbed by Rawmarsh UD, Rotherham CB and Rotherham RD
Greetland UD	West Riding of Yorkshire	1937	absorbed by Elland UD
Guiseley UD	West Riding of Yorkshire	1937	absorbed by Aireborough UD and Ilkley UD
Gunthwaite and Ingbirchworth UD	West Riding of Yorkshire	1938	absorbed by Penistone RD
Handsworth UD	West Riding of Yorkshire	1921	absorbed by Sheffield CB
Haworth UD	West Riding of Yorkshire	1938	absorbed by Keighley MB
Hebden Bridge UD	West Riding of Yorkshire	1937	Hebden Royd UD
Hepworth UD	West Riding of Yorkshire	1895	New Mill UD
Hipperholme UD	West Riding of Yorkshire	1937	absorbed by Brighouse MB
Holme UD	West Riding of Yorkshire	1938	absorbed by Holmfirth UD and Penistone RD
Honley UD	West Riding of Yorkshire	1938	absorbed by Holmfirth UD
Hoyland Swaine UD	West Riding of Yorkshire	1938	absorbed by Penistone UD
Hunsworth UD	West Riding of Yorkshire	1937	absorbed by Spenborough UD
Idle UD	West Riding of Yorkshire	1899	absorbed by Bradford CB
Kirkheaton UD	West Riding of Yorkshire	1938	absorbed by Huddersfield CB and Kirkburton UD
Lepton UD	West Riding of Yorkshire	1938	absorbed by Huddersfield CB and Kirkburton UD
Linthwaite UD	West Riding of Yorkshire	1937	Colne Valley UD, absorbed by Huddersfield CB
Liversedge UD	West Riding of Yorkshire	1915	Spenborough UD
Luddenden Foot UD	West Riding of Yorkshire	1937	Sowerby Bridge UD
Marsden UD	West Riding of Yorkshire	1937	Colne Valley UD
Methley UD	West Riding of Yorkshire	1937	absorbed by Castleford UD and Rothwell UD
Midgley UD	West Riding of Yorkshire	1939	Sowerby Bridge UD and Hepton RD
Monk Bretton UD	West Riding of Yorkshire	1921	absorbed by Barnsley CB
Mytholmroyd UD	West Riding of Yorkshire	1937	Hebden Royd UD
Netherthong UD	West Riding of Yorkshire	1912	absorbed by Holmfirth UD
North Bierley UD	West Riding of Yorkshire	1899	absorbed by Bradford CB
Northowram UD	West Riding of Yorkshire	1900	absorbed by Halifax CB
Oakworth UD	West Riding of Yorkshire	1938	absorbed by Keighley MB
Oxenhope UD	West Riding of Yorkshire	1938	absorbed by Keighley MB
Pudsey UD	West Riding of Yorkshire	1900	Pudsey MB
Queensbury UD	West Riding of Yorkshire	1937	Queensbury and Shelf UD
Quickmere Middle Division UD	West Riding of Yorkshire	1895	Springhead UD
Ravensthorpe UD	West Riding of Yorkshire	1910	absorbed by Dewsbury MB
Rawdon UD	West Riding of Yorkshire	1937	Aireborough UD, absorbed by Bradford CB and Horsforth UD
Rishworth UD	West Riding of Yorkshire	1937	Ripponden UD
Sandal Magna UD	West Riding of Yorkshire	1909	absorbed by Wakefield MB
Scammonden UD	West Riding of Yorkshire	1937	Colne Valley UD
Scholes UD	West Riding of Yorkshire	1895	New Mill UD
Shelf UD	West Riding of Yorkshire	1937	Queensbury and Shelf UD
Shelley UD	West Riding of Yorkshire	1938	absorbed by Kirkburton UD
Shepley UD	West Riding of Yorkshire	1938	absorbed by Kirkburton UD
Skelmanthorpe UD	West Riding of Yorkshire	1938	Denby Dale UD
Slaithwaite UD	West Riding of Yorkshire	1937	Colne Valley UD
Soothill Nether UD	West Riding of Yorkshire	1910	absorbed by Dewsbury MB
Soothill Upper UD	West Riding of Yorkshire	1910	absorbed by Batley MB and Dewsbury MB
South Crosland UD	West Riding of Yorkshire	1938	absorbed by Huddersfield CB, Holmfirth UD and Meltham UD
Southowram UD	West Riding of Yorkshire	1937	absorbed by Brighouse MB and Elland UD
Sowerby Bridge UD	West Riding of Yorkshire	1926	absorbed by Sowerby UD
Sowerby UD	West Riding of Yorkshire	1937	Ripponden UD and Sowerby Bridge UD
Soyland UD	West Riding of Yorkshire	1937	Ripponden UD
Stainland UD	West Riding of Yorkshire	1937	absorbed by Elland UD and Huddersfield CB
Thornhill UD	West Riding of Yorkshire	1910	absorbed by Dewsbury MB
Thornton UD	West Riding of Yorkshire	1899	absorbed by Bradford CB
Thurlstone UD	West Riding of Yorkshire	1938	absorbed by Penistone UD and Penistone RD
Thurstonland UD	West Riding of Yorkshire	1925	Thurstonland and Farnley Tyas UD
Todmorden UD	West Riding of Yorkshire	1896	Todmorden MB
Tong UD	West Riding of Yorkshire	1899	absorbed by Bradford CB
Upper Mill UD	West Riding of Yorkshire	1900	Saddleworth UD
Warley UD	West Riding of Yorkshire	1900	absorbed by Halifax CB
Whitley Upper UD	West Riding of Yorkshire	1938	absorbed by Kirkburton UD
Whitwood UD	West Riding of Yorkshire	1938	absorbed by Castleford UD and Rothwell UD
Wilsden UD	West Riding of Yorkshire	1898	absorbed by Bingley UD
Yeadon UD	West Riding of Yorkshire	1937	Aireborough UD, absorbed by Bradford CB
Ambleside UD	Westmorland	1935	Lakes UD
Bowness-on-Windermere UD	Westmorland	1905	absorbed by Windermere UD
Grasmere UD	Westmorland	1935	Lakes UD
Kirkby Lonsdale UD	Westmorland	1935	absorbed by South Westmorland RD
Old Swindon UD	Wiltshire	1900	Swindon MB
Swindon New Town UD	Wiltshire	1900	Swindon MB
Bromsgrove Country UD (1894–96), North Bromsgrove UD (1896-1933)	Worcestershire	1933	absorbed by Bromsgrove UD and Bromsgrove RD
Great Malvern UD	Worcestershire	1898	Malvern UD
Malvern Link UD	Worcestershire	1898	Malvern UD
Oldbury UD	Worcestershire	1935	Oldbury MB
Stourbridge UD	Worcestershire	1914	Stourbridge MB

=== Abolished in 1974 ===
Urban District	County	Successor(s)
Holyhead UD	Anglesey	Anglesey - Ynys Môn
Llangefni UD	Anglesey	Anglesey - Ynys Môn
Menai Bridge UD	Anglesey	Anglesey - Ynys Môn
Ampthill UD	Bedfordshire	Mid Bedfordshire
Biggleswade UD	Bedfordshire	Mid Bedfordshire
Wantage UD	Berkshire	Vale of White Horse
Brynmawr UD	Brecknockshire	Blaenau Gwent
Builth Wells UD	Brecknockshire	Brecknock
Hay UD	Brecknockshire	Brecknock
Beaconsfield UD	Buckinghamshire	Beaconsfield
Chesham UD	Buckinghamshire	Chiltern
Eton UD	Buckinghamshire	Windsor and Maidenhead
Bethesda UD	Caernarfonshire	Arfon
Criccieth UD	Caernarfonshire	Dwyfor
Llandudno UD, Llandudno cum Eglwys Rhos UD	Caernarfonshire	Aberconwy
Llanfairfechan UD	Caernarfonshire	Aberconwy
Penmaenmawr UD	Caernarfonshire	Aberconwy
Ynyscynhaiarn UD (1894-1915), Porthmadog UD (1915–74)	Caernarfonshire	Dwyfor
Llandeilo UD	Carmarthenshire	Dinefwr
Aberayron UD (1894-1966), Aberaeron UD (1966–74)	Cardiganshire	Ceredigion
New Quay UD	Cardiganshire	Ceredigion
Alderley Edge UD	Cheshire	Macclesfield
Alsager UD	Cheshire	Congleton
Bollington UD	Cheshire	Macclesfield
Bowdon UD	Cheshire	Trafford
Bredbury and Romiley UD	Cheshire	Stockport
Cheadle and Gatley UD	Cheshire	Stockport
West Kirby and Hoylake UD (1894–97), Hoylake and West Kirby UD (1897-1933), Hoylake UD (1933–74)	Cheshire	Wirral
Lymm UD	Cheshire	Warrington
Marple UD	Cheshire	Stockport
Middlewich UD	Cheshire	Congleton
Mottram in Longdendale UD (1894-1936), Longdendale UD (1936–74)	Cheshire	Tameside
Nantwich UD	Cheshire	Crewe and Nantwich
Neston and Parkgate UD (1894-1933), Neston UD (1933–74)	Cheshire	Ellesmere Port
Northwich UD	Cheshire	Vale Royal
Runcorn UD	Cheshire	Halton
Sandbach UD	Cheshire	Congleton
Wilmslow UD	Cheshire	Macclesfield
Winsford UD	Cheshire	Vale Royal
Newquay UD	Cornwall	Restormel
Barnard Castle UD	County Durham	Teesdale
Bishop Auckland UD	County Durham	Wear Valley
Blaydon UD	County Durham	Gateshead
Brandon and Byshottles UD	County Durham	Durham
Consett UD	County Durham	Derwentside
Felling UD	County Durham	Gateshead
Hebburn UD	County Durham	South Tyneside
Houghton-le-Spring UD	County Durham	Sunderland
Ryton UD	County Durham	Gateshead
Seaham Harbour UD (1894-1937), Seaham UD (1937–74)	County Durham	Easington
Shildon UD	County Durham	Sedgefield
Spennymoor UD	County Durham	Sedgefield
Stanley UD	County Durham	Derwentside
Tow Law UD	County Durham	Wear Valley
Whickham UD	County Durham	Gateshead
Cockermouth UD	Cumberland	Allerdale
Keswick UD	Cumberland	Allerdale
Maryport UD	Cumberland	Allerdale
Penrith UD	Cumberland	Eden
Llangollen UD	Denbighshire	Glyndŵr
Alfreton UD	Derbyshire	Amber Valley
Ashbourne UD	Derbyshire	West Derbyshire
Bakewell UD	Derbyshire	West Derbyshire
Belper UD	Derbyshire	Amber Valley
Bolsover UD	Derbyshire	Bolsover
Clay Cross UD	Derbyshire	North East Derbyshire
Dronfield UD	Derbyshire	North East Derbyshire
Heanor UD	Derbyshire	Amber Valley
Long Eaton UD	Derbyshire	Erewash
Matlock UD (1894-1924), The Matlocks UD (1924–34), Matlock UD (1934–74)	Derbyshire	West Derbyshire
New Mills UD	Derbyshire	High Peak
Ripley UD	Derbyshire	Amber Valley
Swadlincote UD	Derbyshire	South Derbyshire
Wirksworth UD	Derbyshire	West Derbyshire
Buckfastleigh UD	Devon	Teignbridge
Budleigh Salterton UD	Devon	East Devon
Crediton UD	Devon	Tiverton
Dawlish UD	Devon	Teignbridge
Exmouth UD	Devon	East Devon
Ilfracombe UD	Devon	North Devon
Kingsbridge UD	Devon	South Hams
Lynton UD	Devon	North Devon
Newton Abbot UD	Devon	Teignbridge
Northam UD	Devon	Torridge
Ottery St Mary UD	Devon	East Devon
Salcombe UD	Devon	South Hams
Seaton UD	Devon	East Devon
Sidmouth UD	Devon	East Devon
Teignmouth UD	Devon	Teignbridge
Portland UD	Dorset	Weymouth and Portland
Sherborne UD	Dorset	West Dorset
Swanage UD	Dorset	Purbeck
Wimborne Minster UD	Dorset	Wimborne
Filey UD	East Riding of Yorkshire	Scarborough
Great Driffield UD (1894-1935), Driffield UD (1935–74)	East Riding of Yorkshire	North Wolds
Hornsea UD	East Riding of Yorkshire	Holderness
Norton UD	East Riding of Yorkshire	Ryedale
Felixstowe UD	East Suffolk	Suffolk Coastal
Stowmarket UD	East Suffolk	Mid Suffolk
Woodbridge UD	East Suffolk	Suffolk Coastal
Burgess Hill UD	East Sussex	Mid Sussex
Cuckfield UD	East Sussex	Mid Sussex
East Grinstead UD	East Sussex	Mid Sussex
Newhaven UD	East Sussex	Lewes
Seaford UD	East Sussex	Lewes
Braintree UD (1894-1934), Braintree and Bocking UD (1934–74)	Essex	Braintree
Clacton UD	Essex	Tendring
Halstead UD	Essex	Braintree
Waltham Holy Cross UD	Essex	Epping Forest
Witham UD	Essex	Braintree
Holywell UD	Flintshire	Delyn
Mold UD	Flintshire	Delyn
Rhyl UD	Flintshire	Rhuddlan
Aberdare UD	Glamorgan	Cynon Valley
Bridgend UD	Glamorgan	Ogwr
Caerphilly UD	Glamorgan	Rhymney Valley, Taff-Ely
Glyncorwg UD (1894-1955), Glyncorrwg UD (1955–74)	Glamorgan	Afan
Maesteg UD	Glamorgan	Ogwr
Mountain Ash UD	Glamorgan	Cynon Valley
Ogmore and Garw UD	Glamorgan	Ogwr
Penarth UD	Glamorgan	Vale of Glamorgan
Pontypridd UD	Glamorgan	Taff-Ely
Porthcawl UD	Glamorgan	Ogwr
Charlton Kings UD	Gloucestershire	Cheltenham
Cirencester UD	Gloucestershire	Cotswold
Kingswood UD	Gloucestershire	Kingswood
Nailsworth UD	Gloucestershire	Stroud
Stroud UD	Gloucestershire	Stroud
Alton UD	Hampshire	East Hampshire
Fareham UD	Hampshire	Fareham
Havant UD (1894-1932), Havant and Waterloo UD (1932–74)	Hampshire	Havant
Petersfield UD	Hampshire	East Hampshire
Kington UD	Herefordshire	Leominster
Ross UD (1894-1931), Ross-on-Wye UD (1931–74)	Herefordshire	South Herefordshire
Baldock UD	Hertfordshire	North Hertfordshire
Bishop's Stortford UD	Hertfordshire	East Hertfordshire
Cheshunt UD	Hertfordshire	Broxbourne
Hitchin UD	Hertfordshire	North Hertfordshire
Hoddesdon UD	Hertfordshire	Broxbourne
Stevenage UD	Hertfordshire	Stevenage
Tring UD	Hertfordshire	Dacorum
Ware UD	Hertfordshire	East Hertfordshire
Ramsey UD	Huntingdonshire (1894-1965), Huntingdon and Peterborough (1965–74)	Huntingdon
St Neots UD	Huntingdonshire (1894-1965), Huntingdon and Peterborough (1965–74)	Huntingdon
Chatteris UD	Isle of Ely (1894-1965), Cambridgeshire and Isle of Ely (1965–74)	Fenland
Ely UD	Isle of Ely (1894-1965), Cambridgeshire and Isle of Ely (1965–74)	East Cambridgeshire
March UD	Isle of Ely (1894-1965), Cambridgeshire and Isle of Ely (1965–74)	Fenland
Whittlesey UD	Isle of Ely (1894-1965), Cambridgeshire and Isle of Ely (1965–74)	Fenland
Cowes UD	Isle of Wight	Medina
Ventnor UD	Isle of Wight	South Wight
Ashford UD	Kent	Ashford
Broadstairs and St Peter's UD	Kent	Thanet
Herne Bay UD	Kent	Canterbury
Northfleet UD	Kent	Gravesham
Sevenoaks UD	Kent	Sevenoaks
Southborough UD	Kent	Tunbridge Wells
Tonbridge UD	Kent	Tonbridge and Malling
Whitstable UD	Kent	Canterbury
Abram UD	Lancashire	Wigan
Adlington UD	Lancashire	Chorley
Ashton-in-Makerfield UD	Lancashire	Wigan, St Helens
Aspull UD	Lancashire	Wigan
Atherton UD	Lancashire	Wigan
Audenshaw UD	Lancashire	Tameside
Barrowford UD	Lancashire	Pendle
Billinge UD (1894-1927), Billinge and Winstanley UD (1927–74)	Lancashire	Wigan, St Helens
Blackrod UD	Lancashire	Bolton
Brierfield UD	Lancashire	Pendle
Carnforth UD	Lancashire	Lancaster
Chadderton UD	Lancashire	Oldham
Church UD	Lancashire	Hyndburn
Clayton-le-Moors UD	Lancashire	Hyndburn
Crompton UD	Lancashire	Oldham
Dalton-in-Furness UD	Lancashire	Barrow-in-Furness
Denton UD	Lancashire	Tameside
Droylsden UD	Lancashire	Tameside
Failsworth UD	Lancashire	Oldham
Fulwood UD	Lancashire	Preston
Golborne UD	Lancashire	Warrington, Wigan
Grange UD	Lancashire	South Lakeland
Great Harwood UD	Lancashire	Hyndburn
Haydock UD	Lancashire	St Helens
Hindley UD	Lancashire	Wigan
Horwich UD	Lancashire	Bolton
Huyton-with-Roby UD	Lancashire	Knowsley
Ince-in-Makerfield UD	Lancashire	Wigan
Irlam UD	Lancashire	Salford
Kearsley UD	Lancashire	Bolton
Kirkham UD	Lancashire	Fylde
Lees UD	Lancashire	Oldham
Leyland UD	Lancashire	South Ribble
Litherland UD	Lancashire	Sefton
Little Lever UD	Lancashire	Bolton
Littleborough UD	Lancashire	Rochdale
Longridge UD	Lancashire	Ribble Valley
Milnrow UD	Lancashire	Rochdale
Newton in Makerfield (1894-1939), Newton-le-Willows UD (1939–74)	Lancashire	St Helens
Ormskirk UD	Lancashire	West Lancashire
Orrell UD	Lancashire	Wigan
Oswaldtwistle UD	Lancashire	Hyndburn
Padiham and Hapton UD (1894–96), Padiham UD (1896-1974)	Lancashire	Burnley
Prescot UD	Lancashire	Knowsley
Rainford UD	Lancashire	St Helens
Ramsbottom UD	Lancashire	Rossendale, Bury
Rishton UD	Lancashire	Hyndburn
Royton UD	Lancashire	Oldham
Skelmersdale UD (1894-1968), Skelmersdale and Holland UD (1968–74)	Lancashire	West Lancashire
Standish-with-Langtree UD	Lancashire	Wigan
Trawden UD	Lancashire	Pendle
Turton UD	Lancashire	Bolton, Blackburn
Tyldesley with Shakerley UD (1894-1933), Tyldesley UD (1933–74)	Lancashire	Wigan
Ulverston UD	Lancashire	South Lakeland
Urmston UD	Lancashire	Trafford
Walton-le-Dale UD	Lancashire	South Ribble
Wardle UD	Lancashire	Rochdale
Westhoughton UD	Lancashire	Bolton
Whitefield UD	Lancashire	Bury
Whitworth UD	Lancashire	Rossendale
Withnell UD	Lancashire	Chorley
Worsley UD	Lancashire	Salford
Ashby de la Zouch UD	Leicestershire	North West Leicestershire
Ashby Woulds UD	Leicestershire	North West Leicestershire
Coalville UD	Leicestershire	North West Leicestershire
Hinckley UD	Leicestershire	Hinckley and Bosworth
Market Harborough UD	Leicestershire	Harborough
Melton Mowbray UD	Leicestershire	Melton
Shepshed UD	Leicestershire	Charnwood
Wigston Magna UD (1894-1930), Wigston UD (1930–74)	Leicestershire	Oadby and Wigston
Spalding UD	Lincolnshire, Parts of Holland	South Holland
Sleaford UD	Lincolnshire, Parts of Kesteven	North Kesteven
Barton-upon-Humber UD	Lincolnshire, Parts of Lindsey	Glanford
Brigg UD	Lincolnshire, Parts of Lindsey	Glanford
Gainsborough UD	Lincolnshire, Parts of Lindsey	West Lindsey
Horncastle UD	Lincolnshire, Parts of Lindsey	East Lindsey
Market Rasen UD	Lincolnshire, Parts of Lindsey	West Lindsey
Skegness UD	Lincolnshire, Parts of Lindsey	East Lindsey
Bala UD	Merionethshire	Meirionnydd
Barmouth UD	Merionethshire	Meirionnydd
Dolgellau UD	Merionethshire	Meirionnydd
Ffestiniog UD	Merionethshire	Meirionnydd
Towyn UD (1894-1967), Tywyn UD (1967–74)	Merionethshire	Meirionnydd
Staines UD	Middlesex (1894-1965), Surrey (1965–74)	Spelthorne
Sunbury-on-Thames UD	Middlesex (1894-1965), Surrey (1965–74)	Spelthorne
Abercarn UD	Monmouthshire	Islwyn
Abertillery UD	Monmouthshire	Blaenau Gwent
Bedwellty UD	Monmouthshire	Islwyn, Rhymney Valley
Blaenavon UD	Monmouthshire	Torfaen
Caerleon UD	Monmouthshire	Newport
Chepstow UD	Monmouthshire	Monmouth
Ebbw Vale UD	Monmouthshire	Blaenau Gwent
Nantyglo and Blaina UD	Monmouthshire	Blaenau Gwent
Pontypool UD	Monmouthshire	Torfaen
Rhymney UD	Monmouthshire	Rhymney Valley
Risca UD	Monmouthshire	Islwyn
Tredegar UD	Monmouthshire	Blaenau Gwent
Usk UD	Monmouthshire	Monmouth
Machynlleth UD	Montgomeryshire	Montgomery
Newtown and Llanllwchaiarn UD	Montgomeryshire	Montgomery
Cromer UD	Norfolk	North Norfolk
Diss UD	Norfolk	South Norfolk
Downham Market UD	Norfolk	West Norfolk
East Dereham UD	Norfolk	Breckland
Hunstanton UD (1894–96), New Hunstanton UD (1896-1954), Hunstanton UD (1954–74)	Norfolk	West Norfolk
North Walsham UD	Norfolk	North Norfolk
Swaffham UD	Norfolk	Breckland
Wells UD (1894-1955), Wells-next-the-Sea UD (1955–74)	Norfolk	North Norfolk
Guisborough UD	North Riding of Yorkshire	Langbaurgh
Loftus UD	North Riding of Yorkshire	Langbaurgh
Malton UD	North Riding of Yorkshire	Ryedale
Northallerton UD	North Riding of Yorkshire	Hambleton
Pickering UD	North Riding of Yorkshire	Ryedale
Skelton and Brotton UD	North Riding of Yorkshire	Langbaurgh
Whitby UD	North Riding of Yorkshire	Scarborough
Desborough UD	Northamptonshire	Kettering
Oundle UD	Northamptonshire	East Northamptonshire
Rothwell UD	Northamptonshire	Kettering
Rushden UD	Northamptonshire	East Northamptonshire
Wellingborough UD	Northamptonshire	Wellingborough
Alnwick and Canongate UD (1894–96), Alnwick UD (1896-1974)	Northumberland	Alnwick
Amble UD	Northumberland	Alnwick
Bedlingtonshire UD	Northumberland	Wansbeck
Hexham UD	Northumberland	Tynedale
Newbiggin-by-the-Sea UD	Northumberland	Wansbeck
Newburn UD	Northumberland	Newcastle upon Tyne
South Gosforth UD (1894–95), Gosforth UD (1895-1974)	Northumberland	Newcastle upon Tyne
Arnold UD	Nottinghamshire	Gedling
Carlton UD	Nottinghamshire	Gedling
Hucknall Torkard UD (1894-1916), Hucknall UD (1916–74)	Nottinghamshire	Ashfield
Mansfield Woodhouse UD	Nottinghamshire	Mansfield
Sutton in Ashfield UD	Nottinghamshire	Ashfield
Warsop UD	Nottinghamshire	Mansfield
West Bridgford UD	Nottinghamshire	Rushcliffe
Bicester UD	Oxfordshire	Cherwell
Thame UD	Oxfordshire	South Oxfordshire
Witney UD	Oxfordshire	West Oxfordshire
Milford Haven UD	Pembrokeshire	Preseli
Knighton UD	Radnorshire	Radnor
Llandrindod Wells UD	Radnorshire	Radnor
Presteigne UD	Radnorshire	Radnor
Dawley UD	Shropshire	The Wrekin
Newport UD	Shropshire	The Wrekin
Wellington UD	Shropshire	The Wrekin
Burnham UD (1894-1917), Burnham-on-Sea UD (1917–74)	Somerset	Sedgemoor
Clevedon UD	Somerset	Woodspring
Crewkerne UD	Somerset	Yeovil
Frome UD	Somerset	Mendip
Minehead UD	Somerset	West Somerset
Portishead UD	Somerset	Woodspring
Shepton Mallet UD	Somerset	Mendip
Street UD	Somerset	Mendip
Wellington UD	Somerset	Taunton Deane
Biddulph UD	Staffordshire	Staffordshire Moorlands
Cannock UD	Staffordshire	Cannock Chase
Kidsgrove UD	Staffordshire	Newcastle-under-Lyme
Leek UD	Staffordshire	Staffordshire Moorlands
Rugeley UD	Staffordshire	Cannock Chase
Stone UD	Staffordshire	Stafford
Chertsey UD	Surrey	Runnymede
Dorking UD	Surrey	Mole Valley
Farnham UD	Surrey	Waverley
Frimley UD (1894-1929), Frimley and Camberley UD (1929–74)	Surrey	Surrey Heath
Leatherhead UD	Surrey	Mole Valley
Woking UD	Surrey	Woking
Kenilworth UD	Warwickshire	Warwick
Baildon UD	West Riding of Yorkshire	Bradford
Barnoldswick UD	West Riding of Yorkshire	Pendle
Bingley UD	West Riding of Yorkshire	Bradford
Darton UD	West Riding of Yorkshire	Barnsley
Denholme UD	West Riding of Yorkshire	Bradford
Dodworth UD	West Riding of Yorkshire	Barnsley
Elland UD	West Riding of Yorkshire	Calderdale
Featherstone UD	West Riding of Yorkshire	Wakefield
Heckmondwike UD	West Riding of Yorkshire	Kirklees
Holmfirth UD	West Riding of Yorkshire	Kirklees
Horbury UD	West Riding of Yorkshire	Wakefield
Horsforth UD	West Riding of Yorkshire	Leeds
Hoyland Nether UD	West Riding of Yorkshire	Barnsley
Ilkley UD	West Riding of Yorkshire	Bradford
Kirkburton UD	West Riding of Yorkshire	Kirklees
Knaresborough and Tentergate UD (1894–95), Knaresborough UD (1895-1974)	West Riding of Yorkshire	Harrogate
Knottingley UD	West Riding of Yorkshire	Wakefield
Meltham UD	West Riding of Yorkshire	Kirklees
Mexborough UD	West Riding of Yorkshire	Doncaster
Mirfield UD	West Riding of Yorkshire	Kirklees
Normanton UD	West Riding of Yorkshire	Wakefield
Otley UD	West Riding of Yorkshire	Leeds
Penistone UD	West Riding of Yorkshire	Barnsley
Rawmarsh UD	West Riding of Yorkshire	Rotherham
Rothwell UD	West Riding of Yorkshire	Leeds
Selby UD	West Riding of Yorkshire	Selby
Shipley UD	West Riding of Yorkshire	Bradford
Silsden UD	West Riding of Yorkshire	Bradford
Skipton UD	West Riding of Yorkshire	Craven
Stocksbridge UD	West Riding of Yorkshire	Sheffield
Swinton UD	West Riding of Yorkshire	Rotherham
Tickhill UD	West Riding of Yorkshire	Doncaster
Wath upon Dearne UD	West Riding of Yorkshire	Rotherham
Wombwell UD	West Riding of Yorkshire	Barnsley
Worsborough UD (1894-1956), Worsbrough UD (1956–74)	West Riding of Yorkshire	Barnsley
Hadleigh UD	West Suffolk	Babergh
Haverhill UD	West Suffolk	St Edmundsbury
Newmarket UD	West Suffolk	Forest Heath
Bognor UD (1894-1929), Bognor Regis UD (1929–74)	West Sussex	Arun
Horsham UD	West Sussex	Horsham
Littlehampton UD	West Sussex	Arun
New Shoreham UD (1894-1910), Shoreham-by-Sea UD (1910–74)	West Sussex	Adur
Windermere UD	Westmorland	South Lakeland
Bradford-on-Avon UD	Wiltshire	West Wiltshire
Melksham UD	Wiltshire	West Wiltshire
Trowbridge UD	Wiltshire	West Wiltshire
Warminster UD	Wiltshire	West Wiltshire
Bromsgrove Town UD (1894–96), Bromsgrove UD (1896-1974)	Worcestershire	Bromsgrove
Redditch UD	Worcestershire	Redditch
Stourport UD (1894-1934), Stourport-on-Severn UD (1934–74)	Worcestershire	Wyre Forest

== 1895 ==
There were 13 urban districts formed in 1895, however 10 districts were abolished meaning there was only a net increase of three to 756.

Urban District	County	Abolished	Successor(s)
Fenny Stratford UD (1895-1911), Bletchley UD (1911–74)	Buckinghamshire	1974	Milton Keynes
Ashton upon Mersey UD	Cheshire	1930	absorbed by Sale UD
Knutsford UD	Cheshire	1974	Macclesfield
Hetton UD	County Durham	1974	Sunderland
Tanfield UD	County Durham	1937	absorbed by Chester-le-Street RD, Consett UD and Stanley UD
Leiston-cum-Sizewell UD	East Suffolk	1974	Suffolk Coastal
Pokesdown UD	Hampshire	1901	absorbed by Bournemouth CB
Mallwyd UD	Merionethshire	1934	absorbed by Dolgellau RD
Esher and the Dittons UD (1895-1933), Esher UD (1933–74)	Surrey	1974	Elmbridge
Ardsley East and West UD	West Riding of Yorkshire	1937	absorbed by Stanley UD and Morley MB
Balby with Hexthorpe UD	West Riding of Yorkshire	1914	absorbed by Doncaster MB
New Mill UD	West Riding of Yorkshire	1938	absorbed by Holmfirth UD and Penistone RD
Springhead UD	West Riding of Yorkshire	1937	absorbed by Saddleworth UD
