= 1973 City of Bradford Metropolitan District Council election =

The first elections to the newly created City of Bradford Metropolitan District Council in West Yorkshire, England were held on 10 May 1973, with the entirety of the 93 seat council - three seats for each of the 31 wards - up for vote. The Local Government Act 1972 stipulated that the elected members were to shadow and eventually take over from the predecessor corporation on 1 April 1974. The order in which the councillors were elected dictated their term serving, with third-place candidates serving two years and up for re-election in 1975, second-placed three years expiring in 1976 and 1st-placed five years until 1978.

As well as replacing the County Borough of Bradford, the new council included:

- Municipal Borough of Keighley
- Baildon Urban District
- Bingley Urban District
- Denholme Urban District
- Ilkley Urban District
- Queensbury and Shelf Urban District (part)
- Shipley Urban District
- Silsden Urban District
- Skipton Rural District (part)

The election resulted in the Conservatives gaining control.

== Election result ==
Bradford local election result 1973
Party	Seats	Gains	Losses	Net gain/loss	Seats %	Votes %	Votes	+/−
Conservative	53	0	0	0	57.0	42.8	52,999	N/A
Labour	31	0	0	0	33.3	36.7	45,477	N/A
Liberal	9	0	0	0	9.7	12.4	15,426	N/A
British Campaign to Stop Immigration	0	0	0	0	0.0	5.1	6,363	N/A
Independent	0	0	0	0	0.0	2.3	2,900	N/A
Ind. Conservative	0	0	0	0	0.0	0.3	328	N/A
Communist	0	0	0	0	0.0	0.3	326	N/A
Social Credit	0	0	0	0	0.0	0.1	102	N/A

This result had the following consequences for the total number of seats on the Council after the elections:

Party	New council
Conservatives	53
Labour	31
Liberals	9
Total	93
Working majority	13

== Ward results ==
Allerton
Party	Candidate	Votes	%	±%
Conservative	G. Ripley	1,989	38.9	N/A
Conservative	N. Walker	1,958		
Conservative	A. Pollard	1,944		
Liberal	E. Evans	1,406	27.5	N/A
Labour	R. Hallam	1,314	25.7	N/A
Labour	J. Ruscoe	1,247		
Labour	H. Purton	1,246		
Liberal	A. Roberts	1,211		
Liberal	A. McCallum	1,187		
British Campaign to Stop Immigration	R. Hemmingway	400	7.8	N/A
British Campaign to Stop Immigration	M. Noble	321		
British Campaign to Stop Immigration	J. Holden	316		
Majority		583	11.4	N/A
Turnout		5,109		N/A
Conservative win (new seat)				
Conservative win (new seat)				
Conservative win (new seat)				

Baildon
Party	Candidate	Votes	%	±%
Conservative	A. Lightowler	2,602	40.6	N/A
Conservative	D. Moore	2,423		
Liberal	F. Atkinson	2,338	36.5	N/A
Conservative	O. Merser	2,215		
Liberal	J. Bywell	2,028		
Liberal	M. Greenwood	1,939		
Labour	J. Lambert	1,468	22.9	N/A
Labour	B. Prince	1,417		
Labour	G. Tiplady	1,351		
Majority		264	4.1	N/A
Turnout		6,408		N/A
Conservative win (new seat)				
Conservative win (new seat)				
Liberal win (new seat)				

Bingley #25 (Denholme, Cullingworth, Bingley South & Wilsden)
Party	Candidate	Votes	%	±%
Conservative	E. Hall	2,616	70.1	N/A
Conservative	M. Nelson	2,531		
Conservative	C. James	2,527		
Labour	J. Lough	1,115	29.9	N/A
Labour	J. Tatham	1,107		
Labour	M. Priestley	1,071		
Majority		1,501	40.2	N/A
Turnout		3,731		N/A
Conservative win (new seat)				
Conservative win (new seat)				
Conservative win (new seat)				

Bingley #26 (Bingley Central, East, North & West)
Party	Candidate	Votes	%	±%
Conservative	A. Chapman	2,937	60.8	N/A
Conservative	M. Carter	2,884		
Conservative	T. Shaw	2,884		
Labour	D. Mytom	1,896	39.2	N/A
Labour	H. Rankin	1,620		
Labour	P. Wall	1,162		
Majority		1,041	21.5	N/A
Turnout		4,833		N/A
Conservative win (new seat)				
Conservative win (new seat)				
Conservative win (new seat)				

Bolton
Party	Candidate	Votes	%	±%
Liberal	J. Rogers	1,236	34.2	N/A
Liberal	F. Sugden	1,209		
Conservative	T. Hall	1,198	33.2	N/A
Liberal	D. Wright	1,182		
Conservative	J. Cook	1,166		
Conservative	S. Dalgleish	1,158		
Labour	E. Brown	851	23.5	N/A
Labour	W. Bramhall	812		
Labour	A. Swindlehurst	787		
Ind. Conservative	H. Sissling	328	9.1	N/A
Majority		38	1.0	N/A
Turnout		3,613		N/A
Liberal win (new seat)				
Liberal win (new seat)				
Conservative win (new seat)				

Bowling
Party	Candidate	Votes	%	±%
Labour	A. Brown	1,164	59.4	N/A
Labour	G. Moody	1,162		
Labour	D. Coughlin	1,136		
Conservative	B. Thresh	794	40.5	N/A
Conservative	W. Stenhouse	792		
Conservative	E. Woodhead	755		
Majority		370	18.9	N/A
Turnout		1,958		N/A
Labour win (new seat)				
Labour win (new seat)				
Labour win (new seat)				

Bradford Moor
Party	Candidate	Votes	%	±%
Labour	W. Johnson	1,546	43.0	N/A
Labour	J. McKenna	1,399		
Labour	M. Thornton	1,344		
Conservative	J. Ambler	1,232	34.3	N/A
Conservative	J. Rees	1,176		
Conservative	K. Warrilow	1,125		
British Campaign to Stop Immigration	G. Lupton	688	19.1	N/A
British Campaign to Stop Immigration	O. Noble	622		
British Campaign to Stop Immigration	D. Regan	601		
Communist	W. Speck	129	3.6	N/A
Majority		314	8.7	N/A
Turnout		3,595		N/A
Labour win (new seat)				
Labour win (new seat)				
Labour win (new seat)				

Clayton, Ambler Thorn & Queensbury
Party	Candidate	Votes	%	±%
Conservative	R. Goodwin	3,007	52.9	N/A
Conservative	J. Hirst	2,749		
Conservative	A. Ormoncroyd	2,686		
Labour	C. Smith	1,941	34.2	N/A
Labour	M. Hallam	1,641		
Labour	K. Ryalis	1,537		
British Campaign to Stop Immigration	S. Merrick	734	12.9	N/A
British Campaign to Stop Immigration	A. Parkes	666		
Majority		1,066	18.8	N/A
Turnout		5,682		N/A
Conservative win (new seat)				
Conservative win (new seat)				
Conservative win (new seat)				

Eccleshill
Party	Candidate	Votes	%	±%
Liberal	M. Thackray	1,382	36.3	N/A
Liberal	N. Todd	1,299		
Liberal	W. Sheffield	1,186		
Conservative	N. Hudson	1,148	30.2	N/A
Conservative	W. Smith	1,138		
Conservative	B. Moore	1,107		
Labour	E. Birkhead	1,041	27.4	N/A
Labour	L. Dunne	1,019		
Labour	P. Bowe	1,012		
Independent	C. Holland	231	6.1	N/A
Majority		234	6.1	N/A
Turnout		3,802		N/A
Liberal win (new seat)				
Liberal win (new seat)				
Liberal win (new seat)				

Great Horton
Party	Candidate	Votes	%	±%
Conservative	A. Dennison	1,892	45.4	N/A
Conservative	J. Horsfail	1,891		
Conservative	E. Johnson	1,890		
Labour	A. Hardman	1,683	40.4	N/A
Labour	C. Richardson	1,607		
Labour	S. Bennett	1,546		
British Campaign to Stop Immigration	J. Merrick	588	14.1	N/A
British Campaign to Stop Immigration	A. Charlesworth	432		
British Campaign to Stop Immigration	M. Lupton	405		
Majority		209	5.0	N/A
Turnout		4,163		N/A
Conservative win (new seat)				
Conservative win (new seat)				
Conservative win (new seat)				

Heaton
Party	Candidate	Votes	%	±%
Conservative	J. King	1,970	48.7	N/A
Conservative	H. Lee	1,949		
Conservative	L. Hamer	1,926		
Labour	J. McElroy	882	21.8	N/A
Labour	J. Bower	861		
Labour	B. Wright	796		
Liberal	G. Roberts	782	19.3	N/A
Liberal	F. Toczek	659		
Liberal	B. Turner	622		
British Campaign to Stop Immigration	V. Browning	414	10.2	N/A
British Campaign to Stop Immigration	J. Gough	413		
British Campaign to Stop Immigration	L. Knighton	357		
Majority		1,088	26.9	N/A
Turnout		4,048		N/A
Conservative win (new seat)				
Conservative win (new seat)				
Conservative win (new seat)				

Idle
Party	Candidate	Votes	%	±%
Liberal	P. Hockney	2,878	48.1	N/A
Liberal	J. Rennison	2,525		
Liberal	A. Bagshaw	2,084		
Conservative	E. Garnett	1,435	24.0	N/A
Conservative	T. Keighley	1,212		
Labour	S. Dunne	1,157	19.3	N/A
Labour	K. Hemingway	1,149		
Labour	O. Hanson	1,125		
Conservative	R. Brook	1,040		
British Campaign to Stop Immigration	A. Webster	509	8.5	N/A
Majority		1,443	24.1	N/A
Turnout		5,979		N/A
Liberal win (new seat)				
Liberal win (new seat)				
Liberal win (new seat)				

Ilkley #27 (Burley, Holme & Menston)
Party	Candidate	Votes	%	±%
Conservative	D. Smith	2,103	46.8	N/A
Conservative	K. Elmsley	1,928		
Conservative	J. Spencer	1,903		
Liberal	C. Svensgaard	1,672	37.2	N/A
Liberal	P. Normandale	1,644		
Liberal	F. Austick	1,525		
Labour	A. Fairburn	715	15.9	N/A
Labour	D. Warwick	666		
Labour	M. Fulker	622		
Majority		431	9.6	N/A
Turnout		4,490		N/A
Conservative win (new seat)				
Conservative win (new seat)				
Conservative win (new seat)				

Ilkley #28 (Ben Rhydding, Ilkley North, South & West)
Party	Candidate	Votes	%	±%
Conservative	E. Wright	2,719	56.5	N/A
Conservative	J. Lightband	2,556		
Conservative	H. Illingworth	2,511		
Labour	C. Dougherty	927	19.3	N/A
Labour	J. Beattle	920		
Liberal	J. Hefferon	886	18.4	N/A
Labour	E. Hutchinson	832		
Liberal	M. Laing	770		
Majority		1,792	37.3	N/A
Turnout		4,808		N/A
Conservative win (new seat)				
Conservative win (new seat)				
Conservative win (new seat)				

Keighley #20 (Haworth, Oakworth & Oxenhope)
Party	Candidate	Votes	%	±%
Conservative	P. Kemp	2,553	54.9	N/A
Conservative	E. Harker	2,484		
Conservative	S. Midgley	2,435		
Labour	D. Hanson	2,100	45.1	N/A
Labour	H. Binns	2,040		
Labour	K. Clark	2,027		
Majority		453	9.7	N/A
Turnout		4,653		N/A
Conservative win (new seat)				
Conservative win (new seat)				
Conservative win (new seat)				

Keighley #21: Keighley West & North West
Party	Candidate	Votes	%	±%
Labour	T. Leech	2,335	44.8	N/A
Labour	H. Peacock	2,289		
Labour	M. Dempster	2,243		
Conservative	A. Smith	1,996	32.3	N/A
Conservative	J. Whitehead	1,918		
Conservative	A. Ogden	1,903		
Liberal	J. Arnold	886	17.0	N/A
Majority		339	6.5	N/A
Turnout		5,217		N/A
Labour win (new seat)				
Labour win (new seat)				
Labour win (new seat)				

Keighley #22 (Keighley Central, East & South)
Party	Candidate	Votes	%	±%
Labour	A. Rogers	2,735	68.1	N/A
Labour	W. Clarkson	2,679		
Labour	E. Newby	2,713		
Conservative	J. Snowden	1,282	31.9	N/A
Conservative	R. Clough	1,267		
Conservative	A. Moran	1,238		
Majority		1,453	36.2	N/A
Turnout		4,017		N/A
Labour win (new seat)				
Labour win (new seat)				
Labour win (new seat)				

Keighley #23 (Morton & Keighley North East)
Party	Candidate	Votes	%	±%
Conservative	B. Womersley	1,844	55.7	N/A
Conservative	A. Trigg	1,818		
Conservative	H. Milton	1,762		
Labour	G. Werham	1,468	44.3	N/A
Labour	F. Jeffrey	1,314		
Labour	E. Loud	1,263		
Majority		376	11.4	N/A
Turnout		3,312		N/A
Conservative win (new seat)				
Conservative win (new seat)				
Conservative win (new seat)				

Laisterdyke
Party	Candidate	Votes	%	±%
Labour	H. Moran	1,162	61.7	N/A
Labour	W. Anderson	1,071		
Labour	T. Wood	1,056		
Conservative	G. Farrar	459	24.4	N/A
Conservative	R. Murray	417		
Conservative	C. York	376		
British Campaign to Stop Immigration	A. Cureton	263	14.0	N/A
British Campaign to Stop Immigration	J. McDonald	263		
British Campaign to Stop Immigration	D. Pickles	248		
Majority		703	37.3	N/A
Turnout		1,884		N/A
Labour win (new seat)				
Labour win (new seat)				
Labour win (new seat)				

Little Horton
Party	Candidate	Votes	%	±%
Labour	J. McKee	1,529	59.7	N/A
Labour	T. Brown	1,513		
Labour	E. Capps	1,504		
Conservative	C. Hill	603	23.5	N/A
Conservative	M. Whitehead	592		
Conservative	C. Harvey	582		
British Campaign to Stop Immigration	F. Boyes	431	16.8	N/A
British Campaign to Stop Immigration	F. Coward	386		
British Campaign to Stop Immigration	J. Whelan	371		
Majority		926	36.1	N/A
Turnout		2,563		N/A
Labour win (new seat)				
Labour win (new seat)				
Labour win (new seat)				

Manningham
Party	Candidate	Votes	%	±%
Conservative	B. Curtis	1,139	31.7	N/A
Conservative	M. Wood	1,123		
Conservative	R. Smith	1,094		
Independent	R. Sahid	1,033	28.7	N/A
Labour	B. Rhodes	942	26.2	N/A
Labour	H. Fielden	899		
Labour	C. Khan	863		
British Campaign to Stop Immigration	H. Gomersall	379	10.5	N/A
British Campaign to Stop Immigration	J. Woodrow	342		
British Campaign to Stop Immigration	J. Tomilty	326		
Social Credit	J. Jennings	102	2.8	N/A
Majority		106	2.9	N/A
Turnout		3,595		N/A
Conservative win (new seat)				
Conservative win (new seat)				
Conservative win (new seat)				

Odsal
Party	Candidate	Votes	%	±%
Conservative	D. Mellor	1,724	49.9	N/A
Conservative	K. Carroll	1,707		
Conservative	C. Lang	1,561		
Labour	F. Bastow	1,472	42.6	N/A
Labour	C. Garnett	1,463		
Labour	H. Parr	1,581		
British Campaign to Stop Immigration	J. Pearson	261	7.5	N/A
British Campaign to Stop Immigration	R. Roberts	243		
Majority		252	7.3	N/A
Turnout		3,457		N/A
Conservative win (new seat)				
Conservative win (new seat)				
Conservative win (new seat)				

Shipley Central, North & East
Party	Candidate	Votes	%	±%
Labour	N. Free	2,756	61.5	N/A
Labour	E. Armitage	2,506		
Labour	F. Thornton	2,430		
Conservative	E. Holgate	1,530	34.1	N/A
Conservative	W. Oldfield	1,281		
Conservative	B. Raper	1,255		
Communist	L. Sheilds	197	4.4	N/A
Majority		1,226	27.3	N/A
Turnout		4,483		N/A
Labour win (new seat)				
Labour win (new seat)				
Labour win (new seat)				

Shipley South & West
Party	Candidate	Votes	%	±%
Conservative	S. Arthur	2,917	69.5	N/A
Conservative	J. Evans	2,910		
Conservative	E. Mason	2,896		
Labour	E. Saville	1,277	30.4	N/A
Labour	R. Wilkes	1,267		
Labour	S. Saville	1,229		
Majority		1,640	39.1	N/A
Turnout		4,194		N/A
Conservative win (new seat)				
Conservative win (new seat)				
Conservative win (new seat)				

Silsden #31 (Silsden, Addingham, Kildwick & Steeton with Eastburn)
Party	Candidate	Votes	%	±%
Conservative	J. Barker	2,357	35.1	N/A
Conservative	A. Jerome	1,822		
Conservative	P. Pettit	1,762		
Independent	W. Cathey	1,636	24.3	N/A
Labour	B. Thorne	1,449	21.6	N/A
Liberal	D. Robinson	1,278	19.0	N/A
Labour	A. Rye	1,263		
Labour	D. Watt	1,212		
Liberal	W. Spinks	923		
Majority		721	10.7	N/A
Turnout		6,720		N/A
Conservative win (new seat)				
Conservative win (new seat)				
Conservative win (new seat)				

Thornton
Party	Candidate	Votes	%	±%
Conservative	J. Foers	1,594	41.0	N/A
Conservative	E. Kinder	1,506		
Conservative	J. Singleton	1,354		
Labour	H. Pickering	1,063	27.3	N/A
Labour	L. Clarke	1,014		
Labour	L. Wassell	959		
Liberal	R. Taylor	682	17.5	N/A
British Campaign to Stop Immigration	P. Barrows	550	14.1	N/A
British Campaign to Stop Immigration	H. Scholes	432		
British Campaign to Stop Immigration	W. Thay	402		
Majority		531	13.6	N/A
Turnout		3,889		N/A
Conservative win (new seat)				
Conservative win (new seat)				
Conservative win (new seat)				

Tong
Party	Candidate	Votes	%	±%
Labour	J. Senior	1,830	74.1	N/A
Labour	T. Mahon	1,764		
Labour	D. Smith	1,735		
Conservative	P. Brear	640	25.9	N/A
Conservative	G. Hobson	632		
Majority		1,190	48.2	N/A
Turnout		2,470		N/A
Labour win (new seat)				
Labour win (new seat)				
Labour win (new seat)				

Undercliffe
Party	Candidate	Votes	%	±%
Conservative	J. Coope	1,444	50.3	N/A
Labour	E. Newby	1,424	49.7	N/A
Conservative	H. Ibbotson	1,406		
Conservative	J. Mears	1,397		
Labour	R. Kitson	1,332		
Labour	L. Coughlin	1,300		
Majority		20	0.7	N/A
Turnout		2,868		N/A
Conservative win (new seat)				
Labour win (new seat)				
Conservative win (new seat)				

University
Party	Candidate	Votes	%	±%
Labour	M. Hussain	1,196	48.6	N/A
Labour	G. Rawnsley	1,130		
Labour	A. Bennett	1,067		
Conservative	R. Heaton	694	28.2	N/A
Conservative	R. Robinson	680		
Conservative	Z. Wyszecki	647		
British Campaign to Stop Immigration	T. Brown	571	23.2	N/A
British Campaign to Stop Immigration	R. Connop	541		
British Campaign to Stop Immigration	N. Ratcliffe	510		
Majority		502	20.4	N/A
Turnout		2,461		N/A
Labour win (new seat)				
Labour win (new seat)				
Labour win (new seat)				

Wibsey
Party	Candidate	Votes	%	±%
Conservative	F. Hillam	1,634	56.0	N/A
Conservative	A. Hodgson	1,542		
Conservative	R. Gross	1,519		
Labour	B. Howell	998	34.2	N/A
Labour	G. Clay	942		
Labour	F. Maden	935		
British Campaign to Stop Immigration	I. Jenkinson	288	9.9	N/A
British Campaign to Stop Immigration	J. Stones	276		
British Campaign to Stop Immigration	J. Cusack	261		
Majority		636	21.8	N/A
Turnout		2,920		N/A
Conservative win (new seat)				
Conservative win (new seat)				
Conservative win (new seat)				

Wyke
Party	Candidate	Votes	%	±%
Labour	B. Seal	2,043	67.8	N/A
Labour	D. Birdsall	2,024		
Labour	L. Kearns	1,984		
Conservative	R. Eaton	968	32.1	N/A
Conservative	M. Cook	916		
Majority		1,075	35.7	N/A
Turnout		3,011		N/A
Labour win (new seat)				
Labour win (new seat)				
Labour win (new seat)				
