= Matlock Urban District =

Former local government area in the UK

Coordinates: 53.14°N 1.55°W

Matlock
- Area
  - 1911: 4,205 acres (17.02 km^{2})
  - 1921: 4,205 acres (17.02 km^{2})
- Population
  - 1901: 5,979
  - 1921: 7,060
- History
  - Created: 1894
  - Abolished: 1974
  - Succeeded by: West Derbyshire
- Status: Urban District
- Government: Matlock Urban District Council
  - HQ: Matlock

Matlock was an Urban District in Derbyshire, England, from 1894 to 1974. It was created under the Local Government Act 1894, originally just covering the town of Matlock. In 1924 it gained Matlock Bath and Scarthin Nick Urban District and the parishes of Cromford and Tansley, which were detached parts of Bakewell Rural District, becoming The Matlocks Urban District. Then in 1934 it gained the urban districts of Bonsall, North Darley (covering Darley Dale, Northwood, and Tinkersley) and South Darley (including Darley Bridge, Wensley, and Snitterton), as part of a nationwide review sparked by the Local Government Act 1929, restoring the name of Matlock Urban District. From then until its abolition in 1974, the Urban District covered that combined area spanning part of the Derwent Valley centred on Matlock but not mostly urbanised, as the name would suggest (similar to Lakes Urban District in Westmoreland).

The district was abolished in 1974 under the Local Government Act 1972 and combined with the Ashbourne, Bakewell and Wirksworth Urban Districts and the Ashbourne and Bakewell Rural Districts to form the new West Derbyshire district, later renamed Derbyshire Dales in 1987.
