= County Borough of Bradford =

Administrative division of Yorkshire, England until 1974

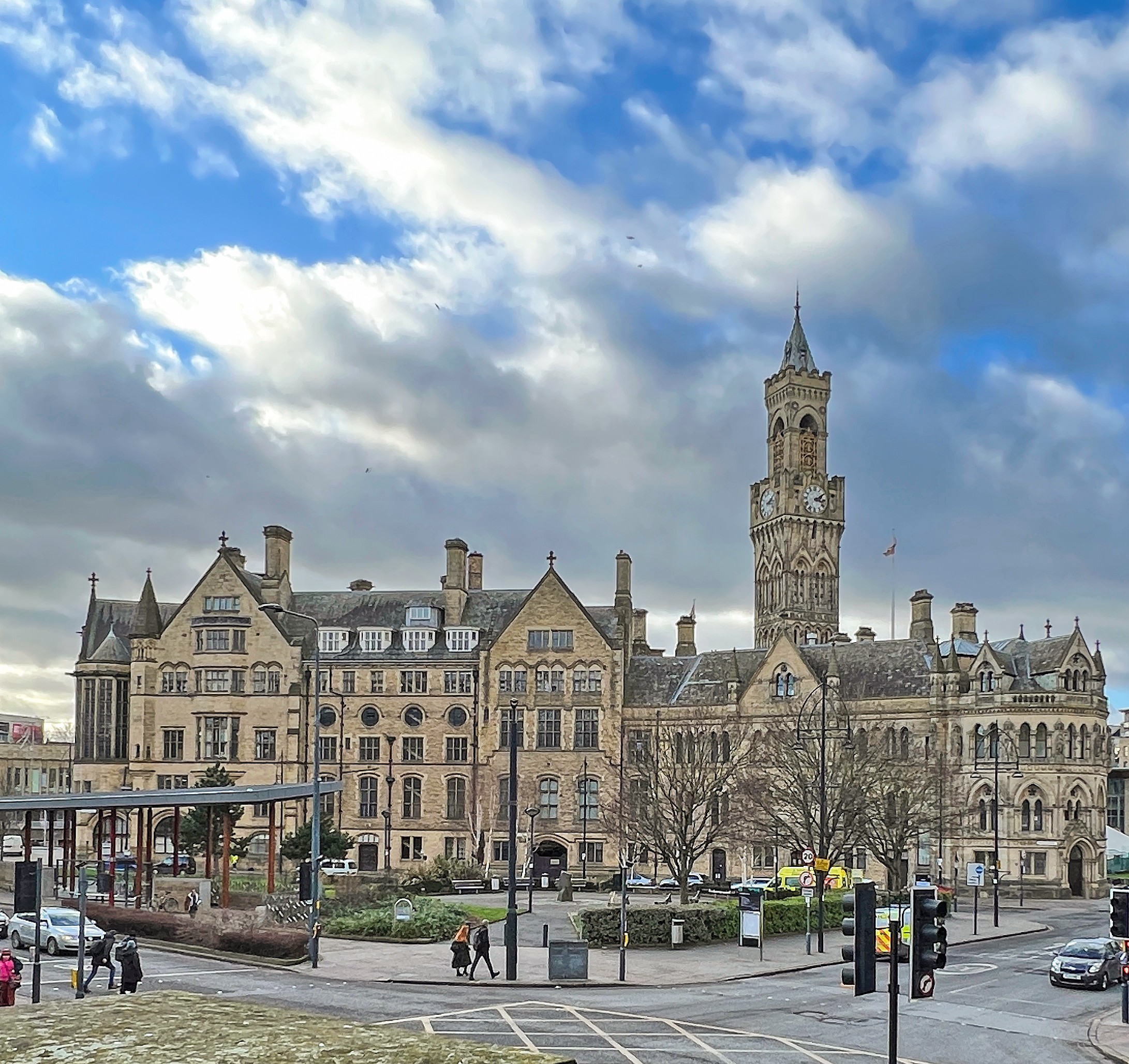
- Bradford City Hall
- Population
  - 1911: 288,458
  - 1931: 298,041
  - 1961: 295,922
- History
  - Created: 1847
  - Abolished: 1974
  - Succeeded by: Metropolitan Borough of Bradford
- Status: Municipal borough (1847–1888); County borough (1888–1974); City (1897–1974)
  - HQ: Bradford
- Map of boundary as of 1971

The County Borough of Bradford was a local government district with city status in the West Riding of Yorkshire, England, from 1847 to 1974.

Bradford became a municipal borough in 1847, and a county borough in 1888, making it administratively independent of the West Riding County Council. It was honoured with city status on the occasion of Queen Victoria's Diamond Jubilee in 1897, with Kingston upon Hull and Nottingham. The three had been the largest county boroughs outside the London area without city status. The borough's boundaries were extended to absorb Clayton in 1930, and parts of Rawdon, Shipley, Wharfedale and Yeadon urban districts in 1937.

Bradford City Hall was opened on 9 September 1873 as the seat of local government. The Venetian Gothic sandstone building was designed by local architects Lockwood and Mawson and is Grade I listed.

The borough was abolished under the Local Government Act 1972, and created the centre of the new Metropolitan Borough of Bradford, which inherited the city status, by a merger with the Municipal Borough of Keighley, the urban districts of Baildon, Bingley, Denholme, Ilkley, Shipley and Silsden, along with part of Queensbury and Shelf Urban District and part of Skipton Rural District, all in the West Riding of Yorkshire.

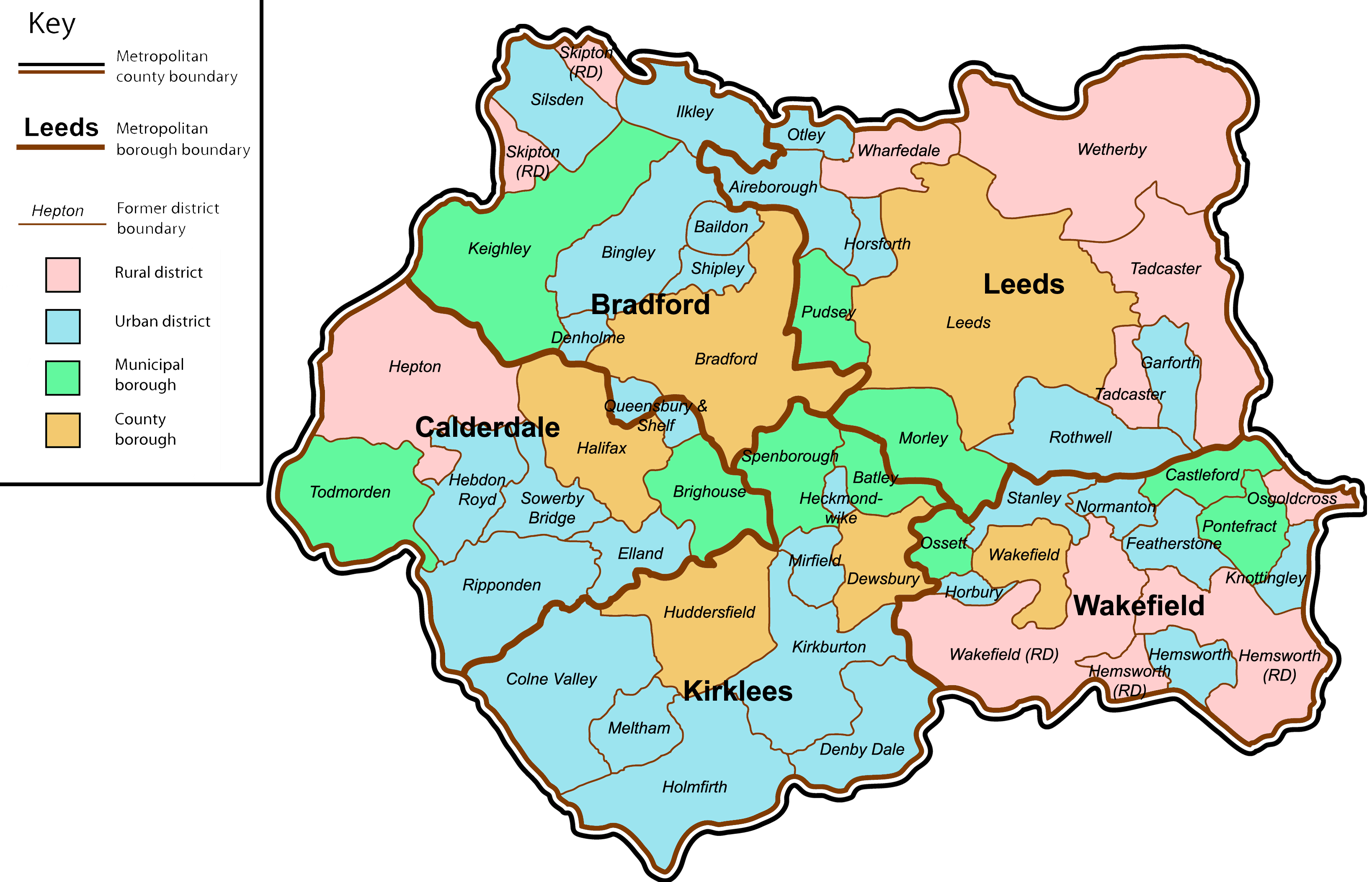
The surrounding pre-1974 districts which now make up West Yorkshire
