= Pokesdown Urban District =

Urban district in Dorset, England

Coordinates: 50.7308°N 1.8248°W

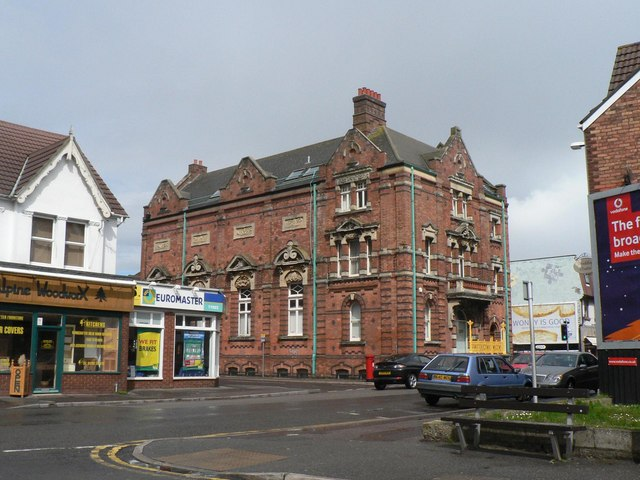
- History
  - Created: 1895
  - Abolished: 1901
- Status: Former urban district
- Today part of: Bournemouth, Christchurch and Poole

Pokesdown Urban District was a short-lived urban district in Hampshire (now Dorset), England. It was created in 1895 and was abolished in 1901 when it was absorbed into the County Borough of Bournemouth.

== See also ==
- List of urban districts formed in England and Wales 1894–95
