= East Elloe Rural District =

History of Lincolnshire

Coordinates: 52.8034°N 0.0226°E

- Rural district
- Population
  - 1901: 8,228
  - 1971: 20,505
- History
  - Created: 28 December 1894
  - Abolished: 31 March 1974
  - Succeeded by: South Holland
  - HQ: Holbeach
- Contained within
  - County Council: Holland

East Elloe was a rural district in Holland in Lincolnshire from 1894 to 1974.

== History ==
The district had its origins in the Holbeach Poor Law Union, which had been established in 1835 covering Holbeach and several surrounding parishes. It was administered from the Holbeach Union Workhouse, which was built in 1836–1837 on Fleet Road in Holbeach. In 1872, sanitary districts were established, with public health and local government responsibilities given to the existing boards of guardians of poor law unions for areas without an existing urban authority. The Holbeach Rural Sanitary District therefore covered the area of the Holbeach Poor Law Union except for Holbeach itself, Long Sutton, and Sutton Bridge, each of which had a local board of health and so formed their own urban sanitary districts.

Under the Local Government Act 1894, rural sanitary districts became rural districts from 28 December 1894. It was decided that the Holbeach Rural Sanitary District would be renamed at the same time, becoming the East Elloe Rural District, named after the historic Elloe wapentake of Lincolnshire rather than being named after the town of Holbeach which it did not include. The neighbouring Spalding Rural Sanitary District was similarly renamed at the same time to become the West Elloe Rural District, but lasted only a few months under that name before changing back to become the Spalding Rural District.

In 1932, East Elloe Rural District was enlarged when the former urban districts of Holbeach, Long Sutton and Sutton Bridge were incorporated into it.

In its early years, the council met at the Holbeach Union Workhouse, which was latterly also known as The Shrubbery before becoming Fleet Hospital. In 1946 the council bought Mattimore House on Fleet Street, Holbeach, converting it to become their offices and meeting place, with the council chamber there being officially opened in November 1948. The council remained based at Mattimore House until its abolition in 1974.

The council was abolished in 1974 under the Local Government Act 1972, and its area went to form part of the new South Holland district. Mattimore House was subsequently demolished, with 78–82 Fleet Street and Mattimore Drive built on the site.
