= Municipal Borough of Buxton =

Former local government area in the UK

Coordinates: 53.259°N 1.911°W

Buxton
- Municipal Borough of Buxton shown within Derbyshire in 1970.
- Area
  - 1911: 1,310 acres (5.3 km^{2})
  - 1961: 6,337 acres (25.64 km^{2})
- Population
  - 1911: 10,024
  - 1961: 19,155
- History
  - Created: 1894
  - Abolished: 1974
  - Succeeded by: High Peak
- Status: Municipal borough
- Government: Buxton Borough Council

Buxton was an urban district from 1894 to 1917 and a municipal borough from 1917 to 1974 in Derbyshire, England.

It was created as an urban district in 1894 under the Local Government Act 1894 and subsequently in 1917 elevated to the status of municipal borough. It was also enlarged at this time when the Fairfield civil parish was transferred to the borough.

The borough was abolished in 1974 under the Local Government Act 1972 and combined with various other local government districts in northern Derbyshire and Tintwistle Rural District in Cheshire to form the new High Peak district.
