= St Thomas the Apostle Urban District =

Former urban district in Devon, England

Coordinates: 50.715°N 3.545°W

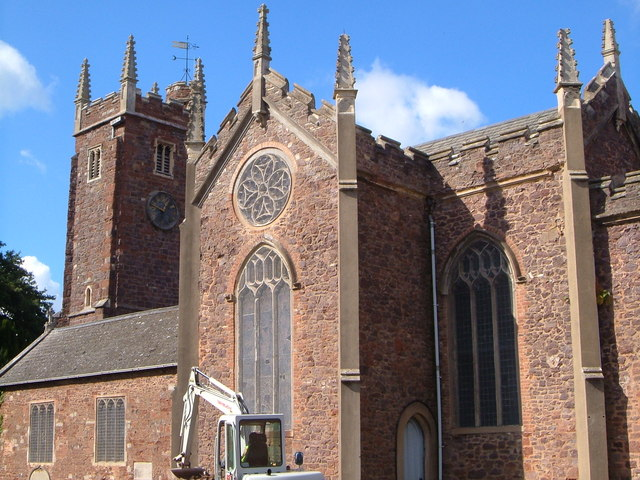
- History
  - Created: 1894
  - Abolished: 1900
- Status: Former urban district

The St Thomas the Apostle Urban District was an urban district in Devon, England. It was created in 1894 and absorbed into the municipal borough of Exeter in 1900.

== See also ==
- St Thomas, Exeter
