= Springhead Urban District =

Former local government area in the UK

Coordinates: 53.552°N 2.062°W

Springhead Urban District was an urban district in the West Riding of Yorkshire in England. Established in 1895, it functioned until 1937 when it was absorbed into Saddleworth Urban District.
