= Bakewell Rural District =

District in Derbyshire, England

Bakewell
- Bakewell Rural District shown within Derbyshire in 1970.
- Area
  - 1911: 84,233 acres (340.88 km^{2})
  - 1961: 85,643 acres (346.58 km^{2})
- Population
  - 1911: 20,257
  - 1961: 18,608
- History
  - Created: 1894
  - Abolished: 1974
  - Succeeded by: West Derbyshire
- Status: Rural district
- Government: Bakewell Rural District Council

Bakewell was a Rural District in Derbyshire, England from 1894 to 1974. It was created under the Local Government Act 1894.

It was enlarged in 1934 when the Baslow and Bubnell Urban District was abolished and amalgamated into the district.

The district was abolished in 1974 under the Local Government Act 1972 and combined with various other local government districts in western Derbyshire to form the new West Derbyshire district.
