= Queensbury and Shelf Urban District =

Former local government area in the UK

Coordinates: 53.764°N 1.828°W

Queensbury and Shelf
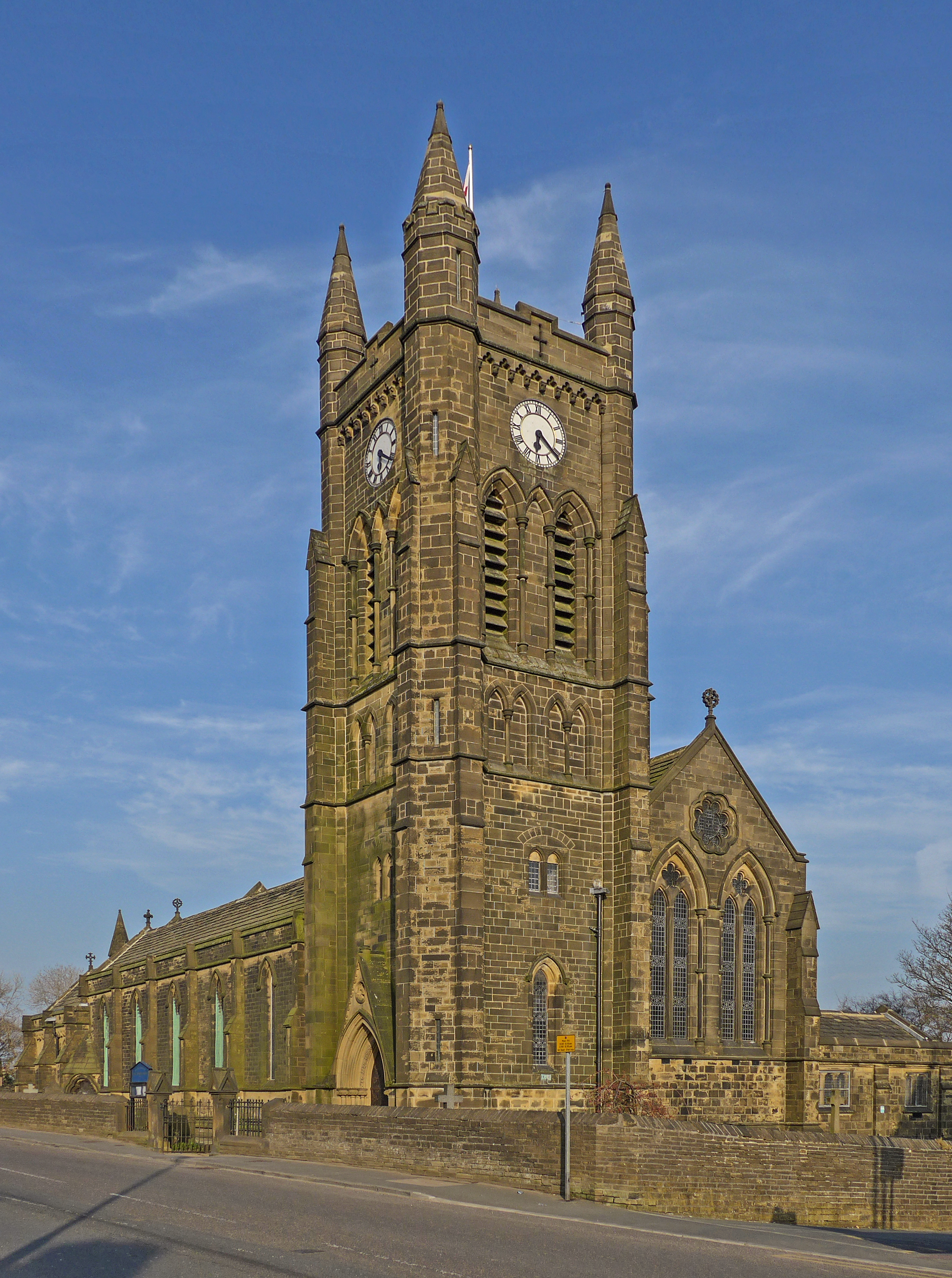
- Area
  - 1951: 2,795 acres (11.3 km^{2})
  - 1961: 2,795 acres (11.3 km^{2})
- Population
  - 1931: 4,415
  - 1971: 10,634
- History
  - Created: 1937
  - Abolished: 1974
  - Succeeded by: Calderdale, Bradford
- Status: Urban district
  - HQ: Albert Road, Queensbury

Queensbury and Shelf was an urban district in the West Riding of Yorkshire from 1937 to 1974. The district was formed by a County Review Order by the amalgamation of Queensbury and Shelf urban districts. It contained only the civil parish of Queensbury and Shelf. In 1961 the district had a population of 9306.

Queensbury and Shelf were included in the metropolitan county of West Yorkshire in 1974 under the Local Government Act 1972. The former urban district was divided between two metropolitan boroughs: the wards of Shelf East and Shelf West were included in Calderdale, and the remaining wards in Bradford.
