= Baildon Urban District =

Previous administrative area in Yorkshire, England

Coordinates: 53.854°N 1.767°W

Baildon
- Urban district
- Population
  - 1911: 6,042
  - 1961: 12,151
- History
  - Created: 1 April 1896
  - Abolished: 31 March 1974
  - Succeeded by: City of Bradford
  - HQ: Baildon
- Contained within
  - County Council: West Riding
- Map of boundary as of 1971

Baildon was an urban district in the West Riding of Yorkshire, England, between 1894 and 1974.

It was enlarged on 1 April 1937 by gaining part of Wharfedale Rural District; 225 acres of the parishes of Esholt and Hawksworth were transferred. Baildon Urban District was abolished under the Local Government Act 1972, becoming part of the City of Bradford Metropolitan District on 1 April 1974. A successor parish was created for the town, called Baildon Town Council.

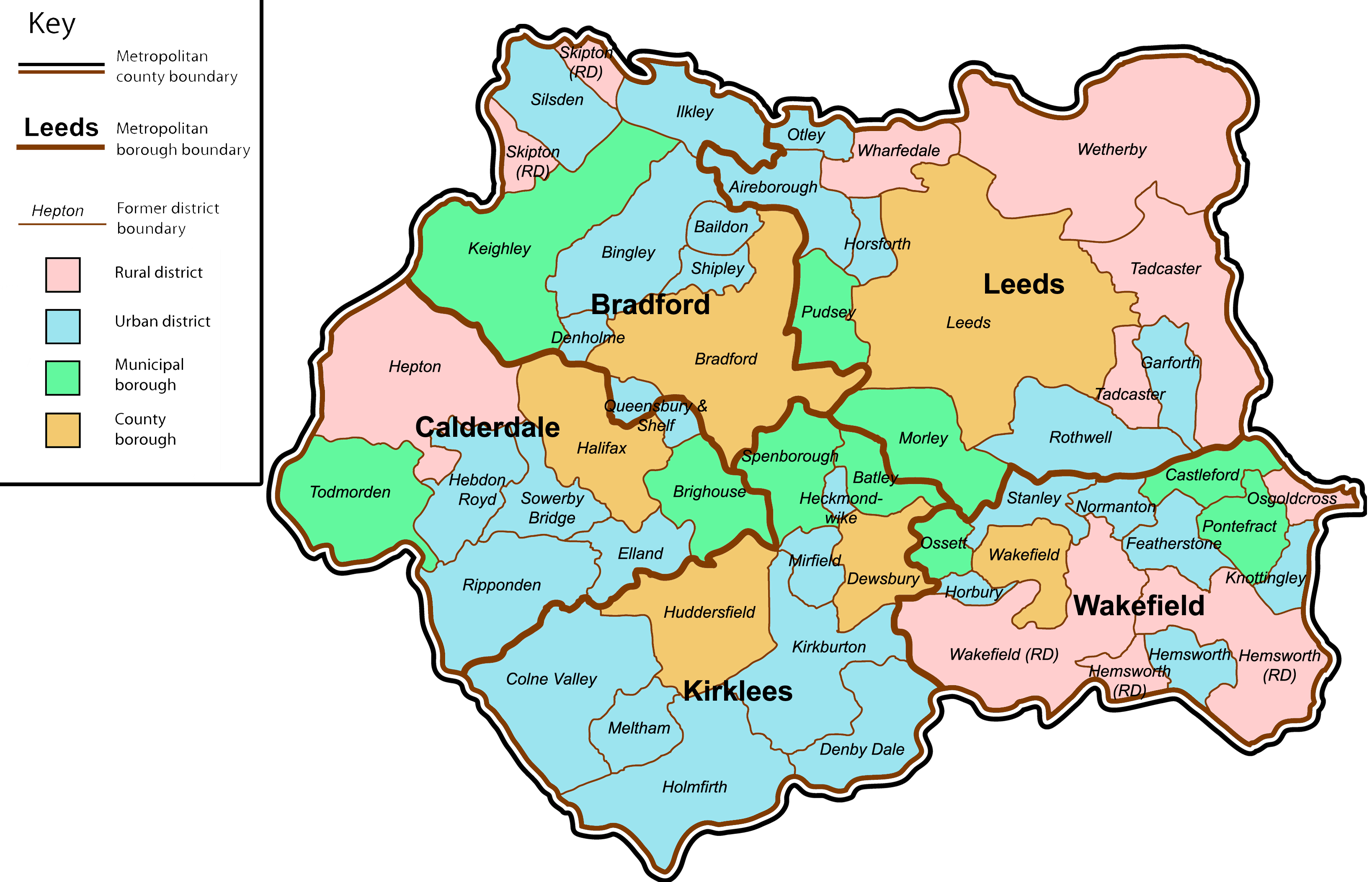
The surrounding pre-1974 districts which now make up West Yorkshire
