= Local Government Act 1972 =

Act of the Parliament of the United Kingdom

Local Government Act 1972 (Note: Section 274(1).)
- Act of Parliament
- Parliament of the United Kingdom
- Long title: An Act to make provision with respect to local government and the functions of local authorities in England and Wales; to amend Part II of the Transport Act 1968; to confer rights of appeal in respect of decisions relating to licences under the Home Counties (Music and Dancing) Licensing Act 1926; to make further provision with respect to magistrates' courts committees; to abolish certain inferior courts of record; and for connected purposes.
- Citation: 1972 c. 70
- Territorial extent: England and Wales (Note: Section 274(2)–(3).)

Dates
- Royal assent: 26 October 1972
- Commencement: 26 October 1972; 1 April 1974; (Note: Section 273.)
Other legislation
Amends	Criminal Law Act 1826; Railways Clauses Consolidation Act 1845; Cemeteries Clauses Act 1847; Burial Act 1857; Metropolitan Commons Act 1878; Riot (Damages) Act 1886; Sheriffs Act 1887; Local Government Act 1894; Light Railways Act 1896; Alkali, &c. Works Regulation Act 1906; Land Settlement (Facilities) Act 1919; War Memorials (Local Authorities' Powers) Act 1923; Rating and Valuation Act 1925; Civic Restaurants Act 1947; Prevention of Damage by Pests Act 1949; Registration Service Act 1953; Nurses Agencies Act 1957; Public Records Act 1958; Weeds Act 1959; Land Compensation Act 1961; Public Health Act 1961; London Government Act 1963; Administration of Justice Act 1964; Commons Registration Act 1965; Plant Health Act 1967; Employers' Liability (Compulsory Insurance) Act 1969; Late Night Refreshment Houses Act 1969
Repeals/revokes	Wales and Berwick Act 1746; Counties (Detached Parts) Act 1844; Burial Act 1854; Burial Act 1860; Burial Act 1871; Public Health (Interments) Act 1879; Burial Boards (Contested Elections) Act 1885; Local Government (Joint Committees) Act 1897; Lincolnshire Coroners Act 1899; Local Authorities (Publicity) Act 1931; Local Government Act 1933; Health Resorts and Watering Places Act 1936; Local Authorities (Expenses) Act 1956; Local Government Elections Act 1956; Public Health Officers (Deputies) Act 1957; Local Government (Pecuniary Interests) Act 1964; Local Government (Qualification of Members) Act 1971
Amended by	Matrimonial Causes Act 1973; Powers of Criminal Courts Act 1973; Consumer Credit Act 1974; House of Commons Disqualification Act 1975; Northern Ireland Assembly Disqualification Act 1975; Airports Authority Act 1975; Adoption Act 1976; Land Drainage Act 1976; Supplementary Benefits Act 1976; Statute Law (Repeals) Act 1977; Rent Act 1977; National Health Service Act 1977; Refuse Disposal (Amenity) Act 1978; Domestic Proceedings and Magistrates' Courts Act 1978; Interpretation Act 1978; Statute Law (Repeals) Act 1978; Ancient Monuments and Archaeological Areas Act 1979; Justices of the Peace Act 1979; Child Care Act 1980; Foster Children Act 1980; Residential Homes Act 1980; Reserve Forces Act 1980; Magistrates' Courts Act 1980; Highways Act 1980; New Towns Act 1981; Acquisition of Land Act 1981; Representation of the People Act 1983; Mental Health Act 1983; Litter Act 1983; Pastoral Measure 1983; Public Health (Control of Disease) Act 1984; Road Traffic Regulation Act 1984; Food Act 1984; Rates Act 1984; Building Act 1984; Cinemas Act 1985; Housing (Consequential Provisions) Act 1985; Weights and Measures Act 1985; Representation of the People Act 1985; Statute Law (Repeals) Act 1986; Consumer Protection Act 1987; Coroners Act 1988; Road Traffic (Consequential Provisions) Act 1988; Statute Law (Repeals) Act 1989; Planning (Consequential Provisions) Act 1990; Water Consolidation (Consequential Provisions) Act 1991; Charities Act 1993; Clean Air Act 1993; Statute Law (Repeals) Act 1993; Statute Law (Repeals) Act 1995; Police Act 1996; Education Act 1996; Criminal Justice and Police Act 2001; Land Registration Act 2002; Statute Law (Repeals) Act 2004; Public Audit (Wales) Act 2004; Mental Capacity Act 2005; National Health Service (Consequential Provisions) Act 2006; Charities Act 2011; Co-operative and Community Benefit Societies Act 2014; Cities and Local Government Devolution Act 2016; Policing and Crime Act 2017; Elections Act 2022; Elections and Elected Bodies (Wales) Act 2024
Relates to	Local Government (Boundaries) Act (Northern Ireland) 1971; Local Government Act (Northern Ireland) 1972; Local Government (Scotland) Act 1973

Status: Amended

Text of statute as originally enacted

Revised text of statute as amended

Text of the Local Government Act 1972 as in force today (including any amendments) within the United Kingdom, from legislation.gov.uk.

The Local Government Act 1972 (c. 70) is an act of the Parliament of the United Kingdom that reformed local government in England and Wales on 1 April 1974. It was one of the most significant acts of Parliament to be passed by the Heath Government of 1970–74.

The act took the total number of councils in England from 1,245 to 412 (excluding parish councils), and in Wales to 45. Its pattern of two-tier metropolitan and non-metropolitan county and district councils remained in use until the 2020s in large parts of England, although the metropolitan county councils were abolished in 1986, and both county and district councils were often replaced with unitary authorities in many areas since the 1990s. In Wales, too, the Act established a similar pattern of counties and districts, but these have since been entirely replaced with a system of unitary authorities.

Elections were held to the new authorities in 1973, and they acted as "shadow authorities" until the handover date. Elections to county councils were held on 12 April, for metropolitan and Welsh districts on 10 May, and for non-metropolitan district councils on 7 June.

== England ==
=== Background ===
Elected county councils had been established in England and Wales for the first time in 1888, covering areas known as administrative counties. Some large towns, known as county boroughs, were politically independent from the counties in which they were physically situated. The county areas were two-tier, with many municipal boroughs, urban districts and rural districts within them, each with its own council.

Apart from the creation of new county boroughs, the most significant change since 1899 (and the establishment of metropolitan boroughs in the County of London) had been the establishment in 1965 of Greater London and its 32 London boroughs, covering a much larger area than the previous county of London. A Local Government Commission for England was set up in 1958 to review local government arrangements throughout the country, and made some changes, such as merging two pairs of small administrative counties to form Huntingdon and Peterborough and Cambridgeshire and Isle of Ely, and creating several contiguous county boroughs in the Black Country. Most of the commission's recommendations, such as its proposals to abolish Rutland or to reorganise Tyneside, were ignored in favour of the status quo.

It was generally agreed that there were significant problems with the structure of local government. Despite mergers, there was still a proliferation of small district councils in rural areas, and in the major conurbations the borders had been set before the pattern of urban development had become clear. For example, in the area that was to become the seven boroughs of the metropolitan county of West Midlands, local government was split between three administrative counties (Staffordshire, Warwickshire, and Worcestershire), and eight county boroughs (Birmingham, Coventry, Dudley, Solihull, Walsall, Warley, West Bromwich, and Wolverhampton). Many county boundaries reflected traditions of the Middle Ages or even earlier; industrialisation had created new and very large urban areas like the West Midlands, Liverpool and Manchester which spanned traditional county boundaries and were now often bigger than and far from their traditional county towns.

The Local Government Commission was wound up in 1966, and replaced with a Royal Commission (known as the Redcliffe-Maud commission). In 1969 it recommended a system of single-tier unitary authorities for the whole of England, apart from three metropolitan areas of Merseyside, SELNEC (South East Lancashire and North East Cheshire, now known as Greater Manchester) and West Midlands (Birmingham and the Black Country), which were to have both a metropolitan council and district councils.

This report was accepted by the Labour Party government of the time despite considerable opposition, but the Conservative Party won the 1970 general election on a manifesto that committed it to a two-tier structure. The new government made Peter Walker and Graham Page the ministers, and quickly dropped the Redcliffe-Maud report. They invited comments from interested parties regarding the previous government's proposals.

The Association of Municipal Corporations, an advocacy group representing the boroughs, responded to Redcliffe-Maud by putting forward a scheme where England outside London would be divided into 13 provinces, with 132 main authorities below that. The AMC argued that the Redcliffe-Maud units would be too far removed from the people they served, and suggested units that in some places were much smaller in size. The Times gave the example of Kent, which under Redcliffe-Maud would have consisted of two unitary authorities, the smaller having a population of 499,000 (as of 1968), while the AMC proposal would divide the same area into seven local authorities, ranging in population from 161,000 to 306,000.

=== White paper and bill ===
The incoming government's proposals for England were presented in a white paper published in February 1971. The white paper substantially trimmed the metropolitan areas, and proposed a two-tier structure for the rest of the country. Many of the new boundaries proposed by the Redcliffe-Maud report were retained in the white paper. The proposals were in large part based on ideas of the County Councils Association, the Urban District Councils Association and the Rural District Councils Association.

The white paper outlined principles, including an acceptance of the minimum population of 250,000 for education authorities in the Redcliffe-Maud report, and its findings that the division of functions between town and country had been harmful, but that some functions were better performed by smaller units. The white paper set out the proposed division of functions between districts and counties, and also suggested a minimum population of 40,000 for districts. The government aimed to introduce a bill in the 1971/72 session of Parliament for elections in 1973, so that the new authorities could start exercising full powers on 1 April 1974. The white paper made no commitments on regional or provincial government, since the Conservative government preferred to wait for the Crowther Commission to report.

The proposals were substantially changed with the introduction of the bill into Parliament in November 1971:

- Area 4 (Cleveland) would have had a border with area 2 (Tyne and Wear), cutting area 3 (Durham) off from the coast. Seaham and Easington were to be part of the Sunderland district.
- Humberside did not exist in the White Paper. The East Riding was split between area 5 (North Yorkshire) and an area 8 (East Yorkshire). Grimsby and Northern Lindsey were to be part of area 22 (Lincolnshire).
- Harrogate and Knaresborough had been included in district 6b (Leeds)
- Dronfield in Derbyshire had been included in district 7c (Sheffield)
- Area 9 (Cumbria) did not at this stage include the Sedbergh Rural District from Yorkshire
- Area 10 (Lancashire) included more parishes from the West Riding of Yorkshire than were eventually included
- Area 11 (Merseyside) did not include Southport, but did include Ellesmere Port and Neston
- Area 12 (Greater Manchester) lost New Mills and Whaley Bridge (to be with Stockport), and Glossop (to be in Tameside)
- The Seisdon Rural District, which formed a narrow peninsula of Staffordshire running between Shropshire and the Black Country county boroughs, would originally have been split three ways, between the Wolverhampton district (15a), area 16 (Shropshire) and area 17 (Worcestershire)
- Halesowen would have become part of district 15d (Sandwell) rather than 15c (Dudley)
- District 15f (Solihull) would have included part of the Birmingham county borough as well as parishes from Stratford on Avon Rural District
- Area 18 (Warwickshire) would have included several parishes from Daventry Rural District in Northamptonshire
- Area 20 (Nottinghamshire) would include Long Eaton from Derbyshire
- Area 26 (Avon) to have covered a larger area, including Frome
- Area 31 (Norfolk) to have covered a large area of East Suffolk, including Beccles, Bungay, Halesworth, Lowestoft, Southwold, Lothingland Rural District, and Wainford Rural District
- Area 33 (Oxfordshire) to include Brackley and Brackley Rural District from Northamptonshire
- Area 39 (Berkshire) to include Henley-on-Thames and Henley Rural District from Oxfordshire
- Area 40 (Surrey) to include Aldershot, Farnborough, Fleet and area from Hampshire

The bill as introduced also included two new major changes based on the concept of unifying estuaries, through the creation of the county of Humberside on the Humber Estuary, and the inclusion of Harwich and Colchester in Suffolk to unify the Stour Estuary. The latter was removed from the bill before it became law. Proposals from Plymouth for a Tamarside county were rejected. The Bill also provided names for the new counties for the first time.

The main amendments made to the areas during the bill's passage through Parliament were:

- renaming of Malvernshire to Hereford and Worcester (the name "Wyvern" was also suggested)
- renaming of Teesside to Cleveland, exclusion of Whitby
- renaming of Tyneside to Tyne and Wear
- removal of Seaham from Tyne and Wear, keeping it in County Durham
- removal of Skelmersdale and Holland from Merseyside – they were to be part of the independent district of Southport, before Southport was included within Merseyside
- exclusion of Colchester and area from Suffolk, kept in Essex
- exclusion of Newmarket and Haverhill from Cambridgeshire, kept in Suffolk (despite protests of Newmarket UDC, which was happy to see the town transferred to Cambridgeshire)
- keeping the Isle of Wight independent of Hampshire
- adding part of Lothingland Rural District from Suffolk to Norfolk.

In the bill as published, the Dorset/Hampshire border was between Christchurch and Lymington. On 6 July 1972, a government amendment added Lymington to Dorset, which would have had the effect of having the entire Bournemouth conurbation in one county (although the town in Lymington itself does not form part of the built-up area, the borough was large and contained villages which do). The House of Lords reversed this amendment in September, with the government losing the division 81 to 65. In October, the government brought up this issue again, proposing an amendment to put the western part of Lymington borough in Dorset. The amendment was withdrawn.

The government lost divisions in the House of Lords at Report Stage on the exclusion of Wilmslow and Poynton from Greater Manchester and their retention in Cheshire, and also on whether Rothwell should form part of the Leeds or Wakefield districts. (Rothwell had been planned for Wakefield, but an amendment at report stage was proposed by local MP Albert Roberts and accepted by the government, then overturned by the Lords.) Instead, the Wakefield district gained the town of Ossett, which was originally placed in the Kirklees district, following an appeal by Ossett Labour Party.

The government barely won a division in the Lords on the inclusion of Weston-super-Mare in Avon, by 42 to 41.

Two more metropolitan districts were created than were originally in the bill:

- Rochdale and Bury were originally planned to form a single district (dubbed "Botchdale" by local MP Michael Fidler); Rochdale took Middleton from Oldham in compensation.
- Knowsley was not originally planned, and was formed from the western part of the planned St Helens district.

As passed, the act would have included Charlwood and Horley in West Sussex, along with Gatwick Airport. This was reversed by the Charlwood and Horley Act 1974, passed just before the act came into force. Charlwood was made part of the Mole Valley district and Horley part of Reigate and Banstead. Gatwick Airport was still transferred.

Although willing to compromise on exact boundaries, the government stood firm on the existence or abolition of county councils. The Isle of Wight (originally scheduled to be merged back into Hampshire as a district) was the only local campaign to succeed, and also the only county council in England to violate the 250,000 minimum for education authorities. The government bowed to local demand for the island to retain its status in October 1972, moving an amendment in the Lords to remove it from Hampshire, Lord Sanford noting that "nowhere else is faced with problems of communication with its neighbours which are in any way comparable".

Protests from Rutland and Herefordshire failed, although Rutland was able to secure its treatment as a single district despite not meeting the stated minimum population of 40,000 for districts. Several metropolitan boroughs fell under the 250,000 limit, including three of Tyne and Wear's five boroughs (North Tyneside, South Tyneside and Gateshead), and the four metropolitan boroughs that had resulted from the splitting of the proposed Bury/Rochdale and Knowsley/St Helens boroughs.

== Wales ==
The background of the act was substantially different in Wales. The Redcliffe-Maud Commission had not considered Wales, which had been the subject of the Welsh Office proposals in the 1960s. A white paper was published in 1967 on the subject of Wales, based on the findings of the 1962 report of the Local Government Commission for Wales. The white paper proposed five counties, and thirty-six districts. The county boroughs of Swansea, Cardiff and Newport would be retained, but the small county borough of Merthyr Tydfil would become a district. The proposed counties were as follows

- Dyfed – West Wales – Cardiganshire, Carmarthenshire, Pembrokeshire
- Glamorgan – South Wales
- Gwent – South-East Wales – Monmouthshire (also including Rhymney valley from Glamorgan)
- Gwynedd – North Wales – Anglesey, Caernarvonshire, Denbighshire, Flintshire, Merionethshire
- Powys – Mid Wales – Montgomeryshire, Radnorshire, Breconshire

Implementation of reform in Wales was not immediate, pending decisions on the situation in England, and a new Secretary of State, George Thomas, announced changes to the proposals in November 1968. The large northern county of Gwynedd was to be split to form two counties (creating Gwynedd in the west and Clwyd in the east) with various alterations to the districts. The Redcliffe-Maud report led to a reconsideration of the plans, especially with respect to Glamorgan and Monmouthshire, and a March 1970 White Paper proposed three unitary authorities for South Wales, based on Cardiff, Swansea and Newport.

After the 1970 general election, the new Conservative government published a Consultative Document in February 1971, at the same time as the English White Paper. The proposals were similar to the Labour proposals of 1968, except that the county boroughs were instead two-tier districts, and that Glamorgan was to be subdivided into West Glamorgan and East Glamorgan, making 7 counties and 36 districts.

In the bill as introduced Glamorgan had been split into three authorities: with East Glamorgan further subdivided into a Mid Glamorgan covering the valleys and South Glamorgan. The decision to split East Glamorgan further left South Glamorgan with only two districts (one of which was the Conservative-controlled Cardiff, who had requested the split) and Mid Glamorgan one of the poorest areas in the country. The Labour-controlled Glamorgan County Council strongly opposed this move, placing adverts in newspapers calling for Glamorgan to be saved from a "carve up", and demanding that the east/west split be retained. The resulting South Glamorgan was the only Welsh county council the Conservatives ever controlled (from 1977 to 1981).

One of the effects of the act was to confirm the area of Monmouthshire as part of Wales. Ambiguity as to the status of Monmouthshire had been introduced by legislation in the 16th and 17th centuries, and by the gradual cultural anglicisation of some eastern parts of the county. By the late 19th century the area was often treated in legislation as one with Wales, using the terminology "Wales and Monmouthshire", although it remained legally part of England.

Apart from the new Glamorgan authorities, all the names of the new Welsh counties were in the Welsh language, with no English equivalent. With the exception of Clwyd (which was named after the River Clwyd) the names of the counties were taken from ancient British kingdoms. Welsh names were also used for many of the Welsh districts. There were no metropolitan counties and, unlike in England, the Secretary of State could not create future metropolitan counties there under the act.

== Act ==
After much comment, the proposals were introduced as the Local Government Bill into Parliament soon after the start of the 1971–1972 session.

In the Commons it passed through Standing Committee D, who debated it in 51 sittings from 25 November 1971 to 20 March 1972.

The act abolished previous existing local government structures, and created a two-tier system of counties and districts everywhere. Some of the new counties were designated metropolitan counties, containing metropolitan boroughs instead. The allocation of functions differed between the metropolitan and the non-metropolitan areas (the so-called "shire counties") – for example, education and social services were the responsibility of the shire counties, but in metropolitan areas was given to the districts. The distribution of powers was slightly different in Wales than in England, with libraries being a county responsibility in England—but in Wales districts could opt to become library authorities themselves. One key principle was that education authorities (non-metropolitan counties and metropolitan districts) were deemed to need a population base of 250,000 in order to be viable.

Although called two-tier, the system was really three-tier, as it retained civil parish councils, although in Wales they were renamed community councils. Within districts some inconsistency prevailed. For example, in Welwyn Hatfield District in Hertfordshire, which comprised Welwyn Garden City, Hatfield and Old Welwyn, Hatfield retained a civil parish council, its 'town council' which could act alone in some matters such as town twinning, whereas Welwyn Garden City did not and therefore had no separate representation.

The act introduced 'agency', where one local authority (usually a district) could act as an agent for another authority. For example, since road maintenance was split depending upon the type of road, both types of council had to retain engineering departments. A county council could delegate its road maintenance to the district council if it was confident that the district was competent. Some powers were specifically excluded from agency, such as education.

The act abolished various historic relics such as aldermen. The office previously known as sheriff was retitled high sheriff. Many existing boroughs that were too small to constitute a district, but too large to constitute a civil parish, were given charter trustees.

Most provisions of the act came into force at midnight on 1 April 1974. Elections to the new councils had already been held, in 1973, and the new authorities were already up and running as "shadow authorities", following the example set by the London Government Act 1963.

The act requires that individuals sentenced to a sentence of more than three months cannot sit as councillors, and are prohibited from re-election until five months after their sentence is over. Councillors can be recalled if they have not attended a formal meeting for 6 months. Individuals who work for a local authority are prohibited from standing for election to it.

The act originally allowed local authorities to prohibit meetings from being filmed, and allowed local authorities to prohibit individuals such as bloggers from recording what was happening at meetings.

Whoever is chair of the authority, is the civic head of the authority, and represents the authority at civic events.

== New local government areas ==
The act specified the composition and names of the English and Welsh counties, and the composition of the metropolitan and Welsh districts. It did not specify any names of districts, nor indeed the borders of the non-metropolitan districts in England – these were specified by Statutory Instrument after the passing of the Act. A Boundary Commission, provided for in the Act, had already begun work on dividing England into districts whilst the bill was still going through Parliament.

In England there were 45 counties and 332 districts (excluding Greater London and the Isles of Scilly), in Wales there were 8 and 37. Six of the English counties were designated as metropolitan counties. The new English counties were based clearly on the traditional ones, albeit with several substantial changes. The thirteen historic counties of Wales were abandoned entirely for administrative purposes and eight new ones instituted.

The act substituted the new counties "for counties of any other description" for purposes of law. This realigned the boundaries of ceremonial and judicial counties used for lieutenancy, custodes rotulorum, shrievalty, commissions of the peace and magistrates' courts to the metropolitan and non-metropolitan counties. The Act also extended the rights of the Duchy of Lancaster to appoint Lord-Lieutenants for the shrunken Lancashire along with all of Greater Manchester and Merseyside.

Before the passing of the act, there were a total of 1,210 councils in England (excluding Greater London councils and the Isles of Scilly). This was made up of 1,086 rural and urban districts (including non-county boroughs), 79 county boroughs and 45 counties. The act reduced the total number of councils outside Greater London and the Isles of Scilly to 377 (45 counties and 332 districts). Most of the new districts were groups of the whole areas of former districts, although 64 rural districts were split between new districts, and there were eleven urban districts or boroughs which saw their territory split between new districts: Teesside County Borough, Whitley Bay Municipal Borough, Ashton-in-Makerfield Urban District, Billinge and Winstanley Urban District, Golborne Urban District, Lakes Urban District, Queensbury and Shelf Urban District, Ramsbottom Urban District, Seaton Valley Urban District, Thurrock Urban District, and Turton Urban District.

=== England ===
==== Metropolitan counties ====
Metropolitan county	Existing geographic county or subdivision	County boroughs	Other parts
Greater Manchester	Cheshire	Stockport	urban north-east Cheshire
Greater Manchester	Lancashire	Bury, Bolton, Manchester, Oldham, Rochdale, Salford, Wigan	urban south-east Lancashire
Greater Manchester	Yorkshire, West Riding	none	Saddleworth urban district
Merseyside	Cheshire	Birkenhead, Wallasey	most of Wirral peninsula
Merseyside	Lancashire	Bootle, Liverpool, St Helens, Southport	urban south-west Lancashire
South Yorkshire	Yorkshire, West Riding	Barnsley, Doncaster, Sheffield, Rotherham	southern West Riding
South Yorkshire	Nottinghamshire	none	Finningley
Tyne and Wear	Durham	Gateshead, South Shields, Sunderland	urban north-east Durham
Tyne and Wear	Northumberland	Tynemouth, Newcastle upon Tyne	urban south-east Northumberland
West Midlands	Staffordshire	Dudley, Walsall, West Bromwich, Wolverhampton	Aldridge-Brownhills
West Midlands	Warwickshire	Birmingham, Coventry, Solihull	Sutton Coldfield, Meriden Gap
West Midlands	Worcestershire	Warley	Halesowen and Stourbridge
West Yorkshire	Yorkshire, West Riding	Bradford, Dewsbury, Halifax, Huddersfield, Leeds, Wakefield	western West Riding of Yorkshire

==== Metropolitan districts ====
Metropolitan county	Metropolitan district	County boroughs	Other components
Greater Manchester	Bury	Bury	Prestwich, Radcliffe, Ramsbottom (part), Tottington, Whitefield (Lancashire)
Greater Manchester	Bolton	Bolton	Blackrod, Farnworth, Horwich, Kearsley, Little Lever, Turton (part), Westhoughton (Lancashire)
Greater Manchester	Manchester	Manchester	Ringway from Bucklow Rural District (Cheshire)
Greater Manchester	Oldham	Oldham	Chadderton, Crompton, Failsworth, Lees and Royton (Lancashire); Saddleworth (West Riding)
Greater Manchester	Rochdale	Rochdale	Heywood, Littleborough, Middleton, Milnrow and Wardle (Lancashire)
Greater Manchester	Salford	Salford	Eccles, Irlam, Swinton and Pendlebury and Worsley (Lancashire)
Greater Manchester	Stockport	Stockport	Bredbury and Romiley, Cheadle and Gatley, Hazel Grove and Bramhall and Marple (Cheshire)
Greater Manchester	Tameside	none	Dukinfield, Hyde, Longdendale, Stalybridge (Cheshire); Ashton-under-Lyne, Audenshaw, Denton, Droylsden, Mossley (Lancashire)
Greater Manchester	Trafford	none	Altrincham, Bowdon, Hale, Sale, part of Bucklow Rural District (Cheshire); Stretford, Urmston (Lancashire)
Greater Manchester	Wigan	Wigan	Abram, Ashton-in-Makerfield (most), Aspull, Atherton, Billinge-and-Winstanley (part), Golborne (part), Hindley, Ince-in-Makerfield, Leigh, Orrell, Standish-with-Langtree, Tyldesley, part of Wigan Rural District (Lancashire)
Merseyside	Knowsley	none	Huyton-with-Roby, Kirkby, Prescot, Simonswood, part of Whiston Rural District (Lancashire)
Merseyside	Liverpool	Liverpool	none
Merseyside	St Helens	St Helens	Ashton-in-Makerfield (part), Billinge-and-Winstanley (part) Haydock, Newton-le-Willows, Rainford, part of Whiston Rural District (Lancashire)
Merseyside	Sefton	Bootle, Southport	Crosby, Formby, Litherland, part of West Lancashire Rural District (Lancashire)
Merseyside	Wirral	Birkenhead, Wallasey	Bebington, Hoylake, Wirral (Cheshire)
South Yorkshire	Barnsley	Barnsley	Cudworth, Darfield, Hoyland Nether, Penistone, Royston, Wombwell, Worsbrough; Penistone Rural District, part of Hemsworth Rural District; part of Wortley Rural District (West Riding)
South Yorkshire	Doncaster	Doncaster	Adwick le Street, Bentley with Arksey, Conisbrough, Mexborough, Tickhill (West Riding), Finningley (Nottinghamshire)
South Yorkshire	Sheffield	Sheffield	Stocksbridge, part of Wortley Rural District (West Riding)
South Yorkshire	Rotherham	Rotherham	Maltby, Rawmarsh, Swinton, Wath upon Dearne; Kiveton Park Rural District, Rotherham Rural District (West Riding)
Tyne and Wear	Newcastle upon Tyne	Newcastle upon Tyne	Gosforth, Newburn, part of Castle Ward Rural District (Northumberland)
Tyne and Wear	North Tyneside	Tynemouth	Wallsend, part of Whitley Bay, Longbenton, part of Seaton Valley (Northumberland)
Tyne and Wear	Gateshead	Gateshead	Blaydon, Felling, Ryton and Whickham, part of Chester-le-Street Rural District (Durham)
Tyne and Wear	South Tyneside	South Shields	Jarrow, Boldon, Hebburn (Durham)
Tyne and Wear	Sunderland	Sunderland	Hetton, Houghton-le-Spring, Washington, part of Easington Rural District, part of Chester-le-Street Rural District (Durham)
West Midlands	Birmingham	Birmingham	Sutton Coldfield (Warwickshire)
West Midlands	Coventry	Coventry	Allesley and Keresley from Meriden Rural District (Warwickshire)
West Midlands	Dudley	Dudley	Halesowen and Stourbridge (Worcestershire)
West Midlands	Sandwell	Warley and West Bromwich	none
West Midlands	Solihull	Solihull	many parishes from Meriden Rural District, and Hockley Heath from Stratford-on-Avon Rural District (Warwickshire)
West Midlands	Walsall	Walsall	Aldridge-Brownhills (Staffordshire)
West Midlands	Wolverhampton	Wolverhampton	none
West Yorkshire	Bradford	Bradford	Baildon, Bingley, Denholme, Ilkley, Keighley, Queensbury and Shelf (part), Shipley, Silsden; part of Skipton Rural District (West Riding)
West Yorkshire	Calderdale	Halifax	Brighouse, Elland, Hebden Royd, Queensbury and Shelf (part), Ripponden, Sowerby Bridge, Todmorden, Hepton Rural District (West Riding)
West Yorkshire	Kirklees	Dewsbury, Huddersfield	Batley, Colne Valley, Denby Dale, Heckmondwike, Holmfirth, Kirkburton, Meltham, Mirfield, Spenborough (West Riding)
West Yorkshire	Leeds	Leeds	Aireborough, Garforth, Horsforth, Morley, Otley, Pudsey, Rothwell; part of Tadcaster Rural District, part of Wetherby Rural District, part of Wharfedale Rural District (West Riding)
West Yorkshire	Wakefield	Wakefield	Castleford, Featherstone, Hemsworth, Horbury, Knottingley, Normanton, Ossett, Pontefract, Stanley; Wakefield Rural District, part of Hemsworth Rural District, part of Osgoldcross Rural District (West Riding)

==== Non-metropolitan counties ====
Non-metropolitan county	Existing geographic county or subdivision	County boroughs	Other parts
Avon	Gloucestershire	Bristol	southern part
Avon	Somerset	Bath	northern part (including Weston-super-Mare)
Bedfordshire	Bedfordshire	Luton	all
Berkshire	Berkshire	Reading	all except the Vale of White Horse and Didcot (to Oxfordshire)
Berkshire	Buckinghamshire	none	southern tip (including Slough)
Buckinghamshire	Buckinghamshire	none	all except southern tip, including Slough (to Berkshire)
Cambridgeshire	Cambridgeshire and Isle of Ely	none	all
Cambridgeshire	Huntingdon and Peterborough	none	all
Cheshire	Cheshire	Chester	all except Tintwistle Rural District (to Derbyshire), north-eastern urban area (to Greater Manchester), Wirral peninsula (to Merseyside)
Cheshire	Lancashire	Warrington	mid-southern part, including Widnes
Cleveland	Durham	Hartlepool	Stockton Rural District
Cleveland	Yorkshire, North Riding	Teesside	urban north
Cornwall	Cornwall	none	all
Cumbria	Cumberland	Carlisle	all
Cumbria	Westmorland	none	all
Cumbria	Lancashire	Barrow-in-Furness	North Lonsdale
Cumbria	Yorkshire, West Riding	none	Sedbergh Rural District
Derbyshire	Derbyshire	Derby	all
Derbyshire	Cheshire	none	Tintwistle Rural District
Devon	Devon	Exeter, Plymouth, Torbay	all
Dorset	Dorset	none	all
Dorset	Hampshire	Bournemouth	area around Christchurch
Durham	Durham	Darlington	all except urban north-east (to Tyne and Wear) and Stockton Rural District (to Cleveland)
Durham	Yorkshire, North Riding	none	Startforth Rural District
East Sussex	East Sussex	Brighton, Eastbourne, Hastings	all except Mid Sussex strip (to West Sussex)
Essex	Essex	Southend-on-Sea	all
Gloucestershire	Gloucestershire	Gloucester	all except southern part (to Avon)
Hampshire	Hampshire	Portsmouth, Southampton	all except part around Christchurch (to Dorset)
Hereford and Worcester	Herefordshire	none	all
Hereford and Worcester	Worcestershire	Worcester	all except Stourbridge and Halesowen (to West Midlands)
Hertfordshire	Hertfordshire	none	all
Humberside	Lincolnshire, Parts of Lindsey	Grimsby	northern strip including Scunthorpe and Cleethorpes
Humberside	Yorkshire, East Riding	Kingston upon Hull	all except northern fringe
Humberside	Yorkshire, West Riding	none	Goole and Goole Rural District
Isle of Wight	Isle of Wight	none	all
Kent	Kent	Canterbury	all
Lancashire	Lancashire	Blackburn, Blackpool, Burnley, Preston	central part only (south-east to Greater Manchester, south-west part to Merseyside, mid-south to Cheshire, North Lonsdale to Cumbria)
Lancashire	Yorkshire, West Riding	none	area including Earby and Barnoldswick
Leicestershire	Leicestershire	Leicester	all
Leicestershire	Rutland	none	all
Lincolnshire	Lincolnshire, Parts of Holland	none	all
Lincolnshire	Lincolnshire, Parts of Lindsey	Lincoln	all but northern strip including Scunthorpe and Cleethorpes
Lincolnshire	Lincolnshire, Parts of Kesteven	none	all
Norfolk	Norfolk	Norwich	all
Norfolk	East Suffolk	none	part of Lothingland Rural District near Great Yarmouth
North Yorkshire	North Riding of Yorkshire	York	all except urban north (to Cleveland) and Startforth Rural District (to Durham)
North Yorkshire	Yorkshire, West Riding	York	northern part including Harrogate, Knaresborough and Selby but not Sedbergh (to Cumbria)
North Yorkshire	Yorkshire, East Riding	York	northern part including Filey
Northamptonshire	Northamptonshire	Northampton	all
Northumberland	Northumberland	none	all except urban south-east (to Tyne and Wear)
Nottinghamshire	Nottinghamshire	Nottingham	all except Finningley (to South Yorkshire)
Oxfordshire	Oxfordshire	Oxford	all
Oxfordshire	Berkshire	none	Vale of White Horse, Wallingford and Wallingford Rural District
Salop (Shropshire)	Salop	none	all
Somerset	Somerset	none	all except northern part (including Weston-super-Mare)
Staffordshire	Staffordshire	Burton upon Trent, Stoke-on-Trent	all except Aldridge-Brownhills
Suffolk	East Suffolk	Ipswich	all, except part of north-east Suffolk near Great Yarmouth to Norfolk
Suffolk	West Suffolk	none	all
Surrey	Surrey	none	all except Gatwick Airport
Warwickshire	Warwickshire	none	all except Sutton Coldfield and Meriden Gap (to West Midlands)
West Sussex	West Sussex	none	all
West Sussex	East Sussex	none	western strip
Wiltshire	Wiltshire	none	all

==== Non-metropolitan districts ====
A list of non-metropolitan districts can be found at List of English districts. The Local Government Boundary Commission originally proposed 278 non-metropolitan districts in April 1972 (still working with the county boundaries found in the Bill). A further eighteen districts were added in the final proposals of November 1972, which were then ordered.

The splits were as follows (in most cases the splits were not exact, and many other changes to the borders of the districts took place at this time)

- Devon: Torridge/North Devon
- Dorset : Weymouth and Portland/Purbeck, North Dorset/East Dorset
- Durham : Wear Valley/Teesdale
- Hereford and Worcester : Hereford/South Herefordshire/Leominster
- Humberside: Holderness/North Wolds
- Isle of Wight: South Wight/Medina
- Lancashire: Hyndburn/Rossendale
- Leicestershire : Rutland/Melton, Harborough/Oadby and Wigston
- Lincolnshire: Boston/South Holland
- Northamptonshire: Daventry/South Northamptonshire
- Northumberland : Berwick-upon-Tweed/Alnwick
- Shropshire : Oswestry/North Shropshire, Bridgnorth/South Shropshire
- Somerset: Taunton Deane/West Somerset
- Suffolk: Forest Heath

The new district in Suffolk was necessitated by the decision to keep Newmarket in Suffolk; which would otherwise have become part of the East Cambridgeshire district.

==== Isles of Scilly ====
Section 265 of the Act allowed for the continuation of the local government arrangements for the Isles of Scilly. The Isles of Scilly Rural District Council became the Council of the Isles of Scilly, and certain services were to continue to be provided by Cornwall County Council as provided by order made by the Secretary of State, although the Isles were not technically in Cornwall before or after 1974.

=== Wales ===
==== New counties ====
New county	Existing geographic county	County boroughs	Other parts
Clwyd	Flintshire	none	all
Clwyd	Denbighshire	none	all except Llanrwst and area
Clwyd	Merionethshire	none	Edeyrnion Rural District
Dyfed	Cardiganshire	none	all
Dyfed	Carmarthenshire	none	all
Dyfed	Pembrokeshire	none	all
Gwent	Monmouthshire	Newport	except parts in Mid Glamorgan and South Glamorgan
Gwent	Breconshire	none	Brynmawr and Llanelly
Gwynedd	Anglesey	none	all
Gwynedd	Caernarvonshire	none	all
Gwynedd	Merionethshire	none	all except Edeyrnion Rural District
Gwynedd	Denbighshire	none	Llanrwst and area
Mid Glamorgan	Glamorgan	Merthyr Tydfil	Aberdare, Bridgend, Caerphilly, Pontypridd, Rhondda etc.
Mid Glamorgan	Breconshire	none	Penderyn and Vaynor
Mid Glamorgan	Monmouthshire	none	Bedwas and Machen, Rhymney, part of Bedwellty
Powys	Montgomeryshire	none	all
Powys	Radnorshire	none	all
Powys	Breconshire	none	all except parts to Gwent and Mid Glamorgan
South Glamorgan	Glamorgan	Cardiff	Barry, Cowbridge, Penarth
South Glamorgan	Monmouthshire	none	St Mellons
West Glamorgan	Glamorgan	Swansea	Glyncorrwg, Neath, Llwchwr, Port Talbot

==== New districts ====
New County	Districts (created in 1974)
Clwyd	Colwyn Rhuddlan Glyndŵr Delyn Alyn & Deeside Wrexham Maelor
Dyfed	Ceredigion Carmarthen Dinefwr Llanelli Preseli South Pembroke
Gwent	Blenau Gwent Islwyn Monmouth Newport Torfaen
Gwynedd	Aberconwy Afron Dwyfor Meirionnydd Anglesey
Mid Glamorgan	Cynon Valley Merthyr Tydfil Ogwr Rhondda Rhymney Valley Taff-Ely
Powys	Brecknock Montgomeryshire Radnor
South Glamorgan	Cardiff Vale of Glamorgan
West Glamorgan	Lliw Valley Neath Port Talbot Swansea

=== Map ===
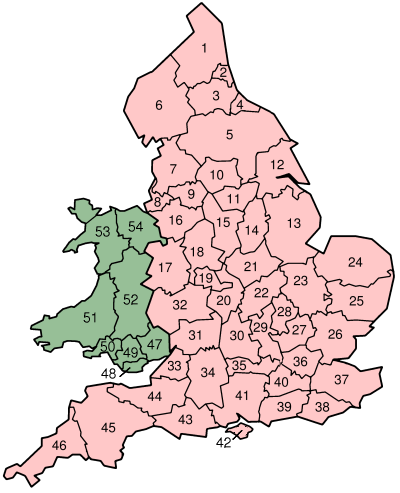
Wales
48. South Glamorgan; 49. Mid Glamorgan; 50. West Glamorgan; 51. Dyfed; 52. Powys; 53. Gwynedd; 54. Clwyd; 47. Gwent
England
1. Northumberland; 2. Tyne and Wear †; 3. County Durham; 4. Cleveland; 5. North Yorkshire; 6. Cumbria; 7. Lancashire; 8. Merseyside †; 9. Greater Manchester †; 10. West Yorkshire †; 11. South Yorkshire †; 12. Humberside; 13. Lincolnshire; 14. Nottinghamshire; 15. Derbyshire; 16. Cheshire; 17. Shropshire; 18. Staffordshire; 19. West Midlands †; 20. Warwickshire; 21. Leicestershire; 22. Northamptonshire; 23. Cambridgeshire; 24. Norfolk	25. Suffolk; 26. Essex; 27. Hertfordshire; 28. Bedfordshire; 29. Buckinghamshire; 30. Oxfordshire; 31. Gloucestershire; 32. Hereford and Worcester; 33. Avon; 34. Wiltshire; 35. Berkshire; 36. Greater London *; 37. Kent; 38. East Sussex; 39. West Sussex; 40. Surrey; 41. Hampshire; 42. Isle of Wight; 43. Dorset; 44. Somerset; 45. Devon; 46. Cornwall
† metropolitan county * 'administrative area' created in earlier legislation

== Elections ==
Elections to the new authorities were held on three different Thursdays in 1973. Each new county and district was divided into electoral divisions, known as wards in the districts. For county councils, each electoral division elected one member; for metropolitan district councils, each ward elected three members; and wards in non-metropolitan districts could elect a varying number of members. There was not sufficient time to conduct a full warding arrangement so a temporary system was used: in some county councils electoral divisions elected multiple councillors.

County councils were set on a four-year cycle of elections of all members, and the next elections were in 1977. Metropolitan district councils elected one councillor for each seat in the three other years, starting in 1975. Non-metropolitan districts had a general election again in 1976, and could subsequently either conduct elections of the whole council or by-thirds. Schedule 3 provided that for each metropolitan ward, the councillor for who obtained the fewest votes in the 1973 election would retire in 1975, the next fewest in 1976, and the others in 1978, setting up the cycle. If equal numbers of votes were obtained, or ward elections in 1973 had been uncontested, the decision would be made by lot.

== Division of functions ==
Health care and water supply / sanitation were assigned to new, separate, non-elected authorities.

The remaining functions previously exercised by local authorities were distributed broadly as follows:

Local government function	Metropolitan counties	Non-metropolitan counties
Allotments	Districts	Districts
Arts and recreation	Counties and districts	Counties and districts
– Libraries	Districts	Counties
– Museums and galleries	Counties and districts	Counties and districts
– Tourism	Counties and districts	Counties and districts
Cemeteries and cremetoria	Districts	Districts
Consumer protection	Counties	Counties
Education	Districts	Counties
Environmental health	Districts	Districts
– Refuse collection	Districts	Districts
Fire service	Counties	Counties
Footpaths (create, protect)	Counties and districts	Counties and districts
Footpaths (maintain, signs)	Counties	Counties
Housing	Districts	Districts
Licence duty	Districts	Districts
Markets and fairs	Districts	Districts
Planning	Counties and districts	Counties and districts
– Local plans	Districts	Districts
– Structure plans	Counties	Counties
– National parks	Counties	Counties
Police	Counties and districts	Counties and districts
Rate collection	Districts	Districts
Smallholdings	Counties	Counties
Social services	Districts	Counties
Traffic and highways	Counties and districts	Counties and districts
– Public transport	Counties	Counties and districts
– Transport planning	Counties	Counties

In many areas both authorities had some powers, and certain Welsh districts were allowed greater powers by the Secretary of State.

== Reaction ==
The system established by the Act was the object of some criticism. One major controversy was the failure to reform local government finance. Having lost office at the general election of February 1974, Graham Page, the minister who had piloted the Act through Parliament, condemned the existing system of rates and grants. His successor as Minister for the Environment, Tony Crosland said that he would be re-examining the rates system, while the Association of Metropolitan Authorities sought the establishment of a royal commission to consider the matter.

The two-tier structure established was also seen as problematic. In particular, the division of planning between districts and counties was a source of friction between the new councils. Thamesdown Borough Council called for a further reform and complete abolition of counties as they felt Wiltshire County Council was unable to respond to the needs of an expanding urban area. Further complaints surrounded the loss of water supply and sewerage powers to regional water authorities created by the Water Act 1973. This was felt to reduce the ability of district councils to plan new housing developments. It was also felt that the boundaries of the metropolitan counties were too tightly drawn, leaving out much of the suburban areas of the conurbations. The leading article in The Times on the day the Act came into effect noted that the "new arrangement is a compromise which seeks to reconcile familiar geography which commands a certain amount of affection and loyalty, with the scale of operations on which modern planning methods can work effectively".

There was some criticism of county boundary changes. A campaign was mounted to return the Uffington White Horse to Berkshire, and a bonfire was lit at the site by protestors as the Act came into effect. The campaigners claimed 10,000 signatures in favour of diverting the county boundary to include the "Berkshire White Horse". The calls were rejected by the local MP, Airey Neave, who pointed out that the horse predated county boundaries, and by the chairman of the Vale of White Horse District Council. Professor Anthony Fletcher, of the Department of Medieval History of the University of Sheffield, suggested that the new councils place signs at the boundaries of ancient counties. The removal of Gatwick Airport and the surrounding area from Surrey into West Sussex met some fierce local opposition with the result that the parishes of Horley and Charlwood were subsequently returned to Surrey in the eponymous Charlwood and Horley Act 1974, leaving the airport to stay in West Sussex.

Some of the reaction against the Act was motivated by opposition to loss of local control. The county borough councils regretted the loss of their independent status. Criticism of the Act also centred on the size of the new districts. The new Minister, whose party had opposed the reforms in opposition, hoped that "it will be more efficient – but it could easily become more remote". In order to combat this, Crosland was considering the creation of "neighbourhood councils" in unparished areas of the new districts. The names of some of the new authorities also caused controversy.

== Amendment and adaptation ==
The system established by the Act was not to last. In England a series of incremental measures amended it. First, the county councils of the metropolitan counties, as well as the Greater London Council, were abolished in 1986 by Margaret Thatcher's government with the Local Government Act 1985, effectively re-establishing county borough status for the metropolitan boroughs. Second, a review of local government outside the metropolitan counties was announced in 1989. The local government reform in the 1990s led to the creation of many new unitary authorities, and the complete abolition of Avon, Cleveland, Hereford and Worcester and Humberside. Names such as Herefordshire and the East Riding of Yorkshire reappeared as local government entities, although often with new boundaries. Several former county boroughs such as Derby, Leicester and Stoke-on-Trent regained unitary status. Additionally, another wave of unitary authorities was formed in 2009.

In Wales there was a more radical change in policy with the two-tier system entirely abolished in 1996, and replaced with the current principal areas of Wales. The 1974 counties in Wales have been retained as preserved counties for various purposes, notably as ceremonial counties, albeit with substantive border revisions.

== See also ==
- Local Government Boundary Commission for England (1972)
- Local Government Act (Northern Ireland) 1972
- Association of British Counties
