= Padstow (electoral division) =

Electoral division of Cornwall in the UK

- ward Cornwall Council
- Boundary of Padstow in Cornwall from 2021.
- County: Cornwall
- Major settlements: Padstow, Flexbury (part)

Current ward
- Created: 2021
- Councillor: Stephen Rushworth (Conservative)
- Number of councillors: One
- Created from: Padstow

2013–2021
- Number of councillors: One
- Replaced by: Padstow
- Created from: Padstow

2009–2013
- Number of councillors: One
- Replaced by: Padstow
- Created from: Council created

Padstow (Cornish: Lannwedhenek) is an electoral division of Cornwall in the United Kingdom. The current Councillor is Stephen Rushworth, a Conservative.

== Councillors ==
=== 2009-2021 ===
Election	Member	Party
2009	Stephen Rushworth	Conservative
2013	Richard Buscombe	Liberal Democrats
2017	Richard Buscombe	Liberal Democrats
2021	Seat abolished	

=== 2021-present ===
Election	Member	Party
2021	Stephen Rushworth	Conservative

== Extent ==
2013-2021 division boundaries shown within Cornwall

=== 2009-2021 ===
The former division represented the town of Padstow, the villages of Trevone, St Merryn, Constantine Bay, and the hamlets of Crugmeer, Treator and Treyarnon as well as parts of Porthcothan (which was shared with the St Issey and St Tudy division). The division was affected by boundary changes at the 2013 election. From 2009 to 2013, the division covered 2955 hectares; from 2013 to its abolition in 2021, the division covered 2960 hectares.

=== 2021-present ===
The current division represents the town of Padstow, the villages of Trevone, Harlyn, Constantine Bay, St Merryn, Porthcothan, St Issey and Little Petherick, and the hamlets of Crugmeer, Treator, Towan, Treyarnon, Engollan, Penrose, St Eval, St Ervan, Rumford, St Jidgey, Trevance, Tregonce, Trevorrick and Highlanes.

== Election results ==
=== 2021-present ===
==== 2021 election ====
2021 election: Padstow
Party	Candidate	Votes	%	±%
Conservative	Stephen Rushworth (Note: Incumbent councillor, representing St Issey and St Tudy)	908	43.4	
Independent	Alec Rickard	871	41.7	
Liberal Democrats	Jacquie Gammon (Note: Incumbent councillor, representing Bodmin St Mary's)	180	8.6	
Independent	Richard Clark	111	5.3	
Majority		37	1.8	
Rejected ballots		20	1.0	
Turnout		2090	40.9	
Registered electors		5107		
Conservative win (new seat)				

=== 2009-2021 ===
==== 2017 election ====
2017 election: Padstow
Party	Candidate	Votes	%	±%
Liberal Democrats	Richard Buscombe	755	55.5	▲3.1
Conservative	Nick Morris	493	36.3	▼9.3
Green	Richard Clerk	108	7.9	New
Majority		262	19.3	▲12.6
Rejected ballots		4	0.3	▼1.7
Turnout		1360	42.3	▲3.0
Liberal Democrats hold		Swing		

==== 2013 election ====
2013 election: Padstow
Party	Candidate	Votes	%	±%
Liberal Democrats	Richard Buscombe	676	52.4	▲28.6
Conservative	Stephen Rushworth	589	45.6	▲4.0
Majority		87	6.7	N/A
Rejected ballots		26	2.0	▲1.2
Turnout		1291	39.3	▼5.8
Liberal Democrats gain from Conservative		Swing		

==== 2009 election ====
2009 election: Padstow
Party	Candidate	Votes	%	±%
Conservative	Stephen Rushworth	652	41.6	
Liberal Democrats	Sarah Townrow	373	23.8	
Mebyon Kernow	Ron Brown	363	23.2	
BNP	Bob Smart	86	5.5	
Green	Katherine Spear	82	5.2	
Majority		279	17.8	
Rejected ballots		12	0.8	
Turnout		1568	45.1	
Conservative win (new seat)				
