= St Issey and St Tudy (electoral division) =

Former electoral division of Cornwall in the UK

- Former ward Cornwall Council
- Boundary of St Issey and St Tudy in from 2013-2021.
- County: Cornwall

2013–2021
- Number of councillors: One
- Replaced by: Padstow; Wadebridge West and St Mabyn; St Teath and Tintagel
- Created from: St Issey

St Issey and St Tudy (Cornish: Egloskrug hag Eglostudik) was an electoral division of Cornwall in the United Kingdom which returned one member to sit on Cornwall Council between 2013 and 2021. It was abolished at the 2021 local elections, being succeeded by Padstow, Wadebridge West and St Mabyn and St Teath and Tintagel.

== Councillors ==
Election	Member	Party
2013	Jeremy Rowe	Liberal Democrat
2017	Stephen Rushworth	Conservative
2021	Seat abolished	

== Extent ==
St Issey and St Tudy represented the villages of Little Petherick, St Issey, St Mabyn, St Tudy and St Breock, as well as the hamlets of Engollan, St Eval, Rumford, Highlanes, Trevance, Tredinnick, St Jidgey, Trevorrick, Tregonce, Edmonton, Burlawn, Washaway, Longstone and St Ervan. Parts of Porthcothan (shared with Padstow division) and Ruthernbridge (shared with Lanivet and Blisland) were also covered. The division covered 11,822 hectares in total.

== Election results ==
=== 2017 election ===
2017 election: St Issey and St Tudy
Party	Candidate	Votes	%	±%
Conservative	Stephen Rushworth	883	99.3	New
Majority		883	99.3	N/A
Rejected ballots		6	0.7	▼1.0
Turnout		889	24.7	▼8.8
Conservative gain from Liberal Democrats		Swing		

=== 2013 election ===
2013 election: St Issey and St Tudy
Party	Candidate	Votes	%	±%
Liberal Democrats	Jeremy Rowe	601	52.4	
Independent	Emma Hambly	526	45.9	
Majority		75	6.5	
Rejected ballots		20	1.7	
Turnout		1147	33.5	
Liberal Democrats win (new seat)				
