= St Conan's Church, Egloshayle =

Church in Cornwall, England

St Conan’s Church, Washaway, Wadebridge
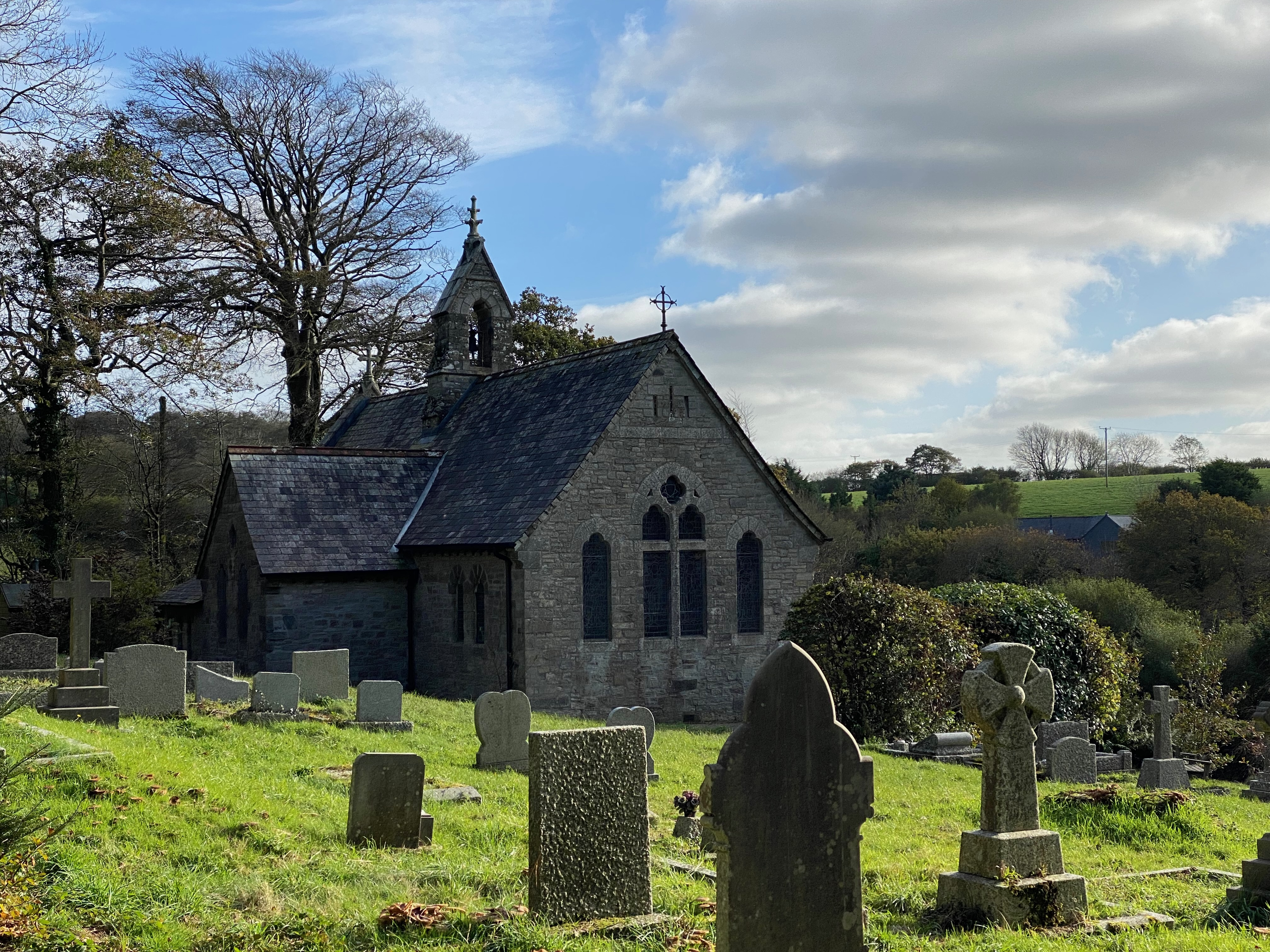
- St Conan’s Church, Washaway, Wadebridge
- 50°29′49.2″N 4°46′15.96″W
- Location: Washaway
- Country: England
- Denomination: Church of England
- Website: https://www.wadebridgeparish.org.uk

History
- Dedication: St Conan

Architecture
- Heritage designation: Grade II listed
- Architect: James Arthur Reeve
- Completed: 1883
- Construction cost: £490

Administration
- Province: Province of Canterbury
- Diocese: Diocese of Truro
- Archdeaconry: Bodmin
- Deanery: Trigg Minor and Bodmin
- Parish: St Breoke and Egloshalye in Wadebridge

Clergy
- Rector: Rev'd Jules Williams

The Church of St Conan is an Anglican church on the A389 road near Washaway in Egloshayle, Cornwall, England, UK.

== History ==
Built at a cost of £490 with designs by James Arthur Reeve of Norwich, the church was opened for worship on 23 July 1883. The stonemasons responsible for its construction were Gill and Cleave of Egloshayle, while the carpentry work was undertaken by Mr Williams of Egloshayle. The granite work was provided by Mr Evans from the firm of Doney and Evans.

It reportedly has an ancient font of Saxon origin. This font came from Lanteglos-by-Camelford; it is similar to one at Morwenstow but has much decoration of a Celtic character. Nikolaus Pevsner dated it as c. 1100 or earlier. There is a fine pulpit, possibly of German workmanship.

The church became a Grade II listed building on 4 November 1988.

The saint to whom the church is dedicated may have been Conan who was associated with St Petroc; another possibility is that he is Conan who was Bishop of St Germans in the 930s. St Conan's feast is celebrated on 23 July.

== Parish status ==
The church is in a joint parish with:

- St Breoke's Church, St Breock, Wadebridge
- St Petroc's Church, Egloshayle
- St Mary's at the Betjeman Centre, Wadebridge (Closed and demolished)

== Vicars ==
Current Clergy

- Rev'd Jules Williams - Rector

Previous Clergy

- Rev'd Stephen Payne - Rector (retired)
- Rev'd John Hereward - Rector (retired)
- Rev'd Willian Stuart-White - Priest In Charge (retired)
