= Edmonton (disambiguation) =

Edmonton is the capital city of the Canadian province of Alberta.

Edmonton may also refer to:

== Places ==
=== Australia ===
- Edmonton, Queensland, a town and suburb in Cairns

=== Canada ===
- Edmonton Metropolitan Region
- Snelgrove, Ontario, previously known as Edmonton

==== Electoral districts ====
- Edmonton (federal electoral district), Canadian federal riding between 1903 and 1914
- Edmonton (provincial electoral district), Alberta provincial electoral district from 1905 to 1909 and 1921–1955
- Edmonton (territorial electoral district), a Canadian riding in the Northwest Territories from 1883 to 1905
- Edmonton-Castle Downs, Alberta provincial electoral district
- Edmonton Centre, Canadian federal electoral district
- Edmonton-Ellerslie, Alberta provincial electoral district
- Edmonton-Whitemud, Alberta provincial electoral district

=== England ===
- Edmonton, Cornwall
- Edmonton, London
  - Edmonton Hundred, an ancient hundred in north Middlesex
  - Municipal Borough of Edmonton, a local government (1850–1965)
  - Edmonton (UK Parliament constituency), the Parliamentary constituency corresponding to Edmonton, London

=== United States ===
- Edmonton, Kentucky

== Religion ==
- Anglican Diocese of Edmonton, a diocese of the Ecclesiastical Province of Rupert's Land of the Anglican Church of Canada
- Roman Catholic Archdiocese of Edmonton, a Roman Catholic archdiocese in the province of Alberta

== Sports ==
- Edmonton Elks, formerly Edmonton Eskimos, a professional Canadian Football League (CFL) team based in Edmonton, Alberta
- Edmonton Oil Kings, a major junior ice hockey team based in Edmonton, Alberta, Canada that play in the Western Hockey League
- Edmonton Oilers, a professional ice hockey team based in Edmonton, Alberta. They are members of the Pacific Division of the Western Conference of the National Hockey League (NHL)
- Edmonton Rush, a professional lacrosse team in the National Lacrosse League (NLL) that played from 2006 NLL season to 2015, they now play in Saskatoon as the Saskatchewan Rush.
- Edmonton International Raceway, a 1/4 mile paved oval auto racing facility

== People ==
- Dennis Edmonton (born 1943), former stage name of Canadian rock musician Mars Bonfire, writer of the hit song "Born to Be Wild" for Steppenwolf
- Jerry Edmonton (1946–1993), Canadian rock musician and drummer for the rock band Steppenwolf

== Other uses ==
- 96193 Edmonton, an asteroid
- Edmonton Green railway station, a railway station
- Edmonton tornado, a large tornado
- HMCS Edmonton, a vessel of the Canadian Forces
- West Edmonton Mall, a shopping mall in Edmonton, Alberta, Canada

== See also ==
- Edmontosaurus, a dinosaur
