= Royal Cornwall Show =

Agricultural show

Coordinates: 50.5140°N 04.8654°W

Royal Cornwall Agricultural Show
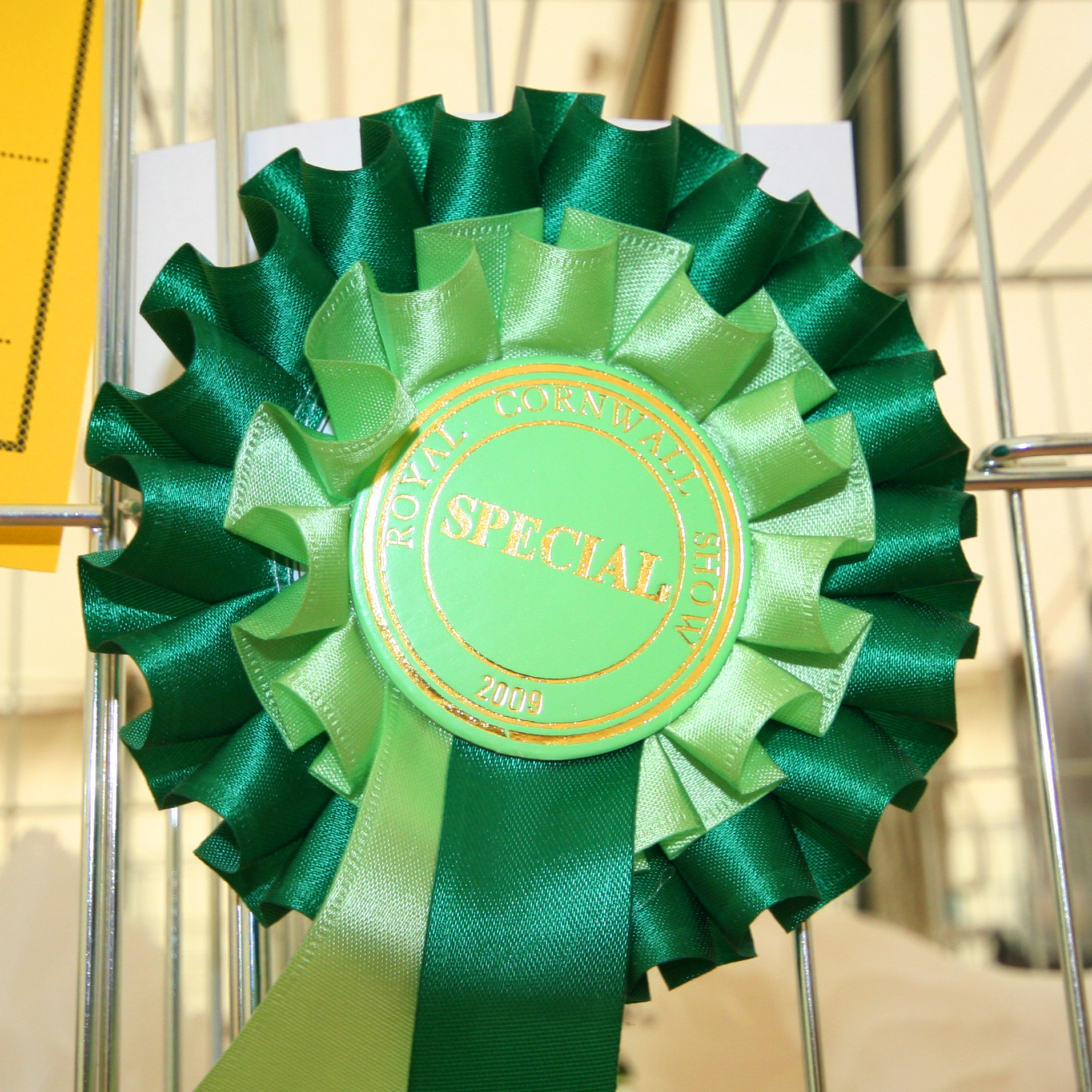
- Rosette from the Royal Cornwall Show 2009
- Formation: 1827; 199 years ago
- Type: Agricultural show
- Headquarters: Wadebridge
- Location: Cornwall
- Official language: English
- Website: http://www.royalcornwallshow.org/

The Royal Cornwall Agricultural Show, usually called the Royal Cornwall Show, is an annual agricultural show organised by the Royal Cornwall Agricultural Association, which takes place at the beginning of June, at Wadebridge in north Cornwall, England, United Kingdom. The showground is on the south side of the A39 main road and between the hamlets of St Breock and Whitecross. The show lasts for three days and attracts approximately 120,000 visitors annually.

== History ==
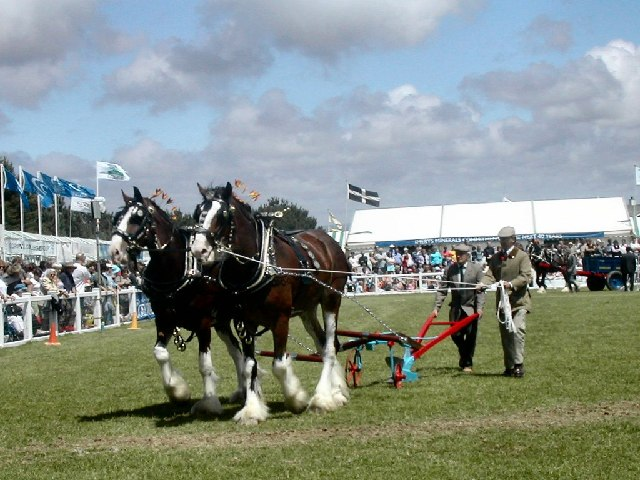
The main ring at the Royal Cornwall Show in June 2004

The Royal Cornwall Agricultural Association was founded in 1793, and has been known by that name since 1858. The first event was a ploughing match, held in 1793 near Truro, and the following year prizes for livestock were introduced. While initially held in Truro, the event moved to Bodmin, then from 1858 the show moved around between locations, before establishing itself at the permanent showgrounds in Wadebridge in 1960.

Members of the royal family often attend the show, including King Charles III who is a supporter of the farming community and was the Royal Cornwall Agricultural Association's patron between 2003 and 2022. Princess Alexandra attended the 2009 show. Prince William was appointed patron of the Royal Cornwall Agricultural Association in 2024.

Organisers claim that the Burke Cattle Trophies awarded at the show are the "only true national award" for cattle showing left in the UK.

== Business ==
Businesses with links to agriculture have trade stands at the show, using the opportunity to attract new business as well as to network with current customers.

== Social event ==
The show is attended by people who live in farming communities in Cornwall. Events include:

- Judging of cattle, sheep, horses, goats and various other domestic animals
- Sheepdog trials
- Riding competitions
- Driving displays
- Falconry
- Games and sports
- Craft show
- Live music
- The culmination of the county cup for the Cornwall Young Farmers' Club.

The show was held at Truro between 1827 and 1857, and from then on the venue changed every year until 1960, when the showground at Wadebridge became its permanent home. No show was held from 1915 to 1918, 1940 to 1945 due to the wars, nor 2020, due to COVID-19 pandemic restrictions.

- YEAR – LOCATION, ATTENDANCE
- 1827 to 1857 – Truro
- 1858
- 1859
- 1860
- 1861
- 1862
- 1863
- 1864
- 1865
- 1866
- 1867
- 1868
- 1869
- 1870 – Launceston
- 1871 – Truro
- 1872 – Bodmin, 17331 attendance for the two-day show
- 1873 – Penryn, 11,712
- 1874 – St Austell 17,022
- 1875 – Truro, 24,212
- 1876 – Liskeard, 14228
- 1877 – Camborne, 17186
- 1878 – Saltash, 13,394
- 1879 – Falmouth, 18,926 attendance for the two-day show (12,414 paid for admission)
- 1880 – Lostwithiel (Lanwithan estate), 9,188 paid for admission to the two day show.
- 1881 – Redruth, 20,105
- 1882 – Launceston, 16,399
- 1883 – Truro (Tremorva), 21,871
- 1884 – Bodmin, 16,057 (the following citation applies to the entries for 1870 to 1884)
- 1885 – Penzance (Treneere), 15,569
- 1886 – St Austell (Moire Cottage grounds), 16,551
- 1887 – Camborne (Rosewarne), 16,753
- 1888 – Newquay, 11,711
- 1889 – Helston, 12,974
- 1890 – Truro, 12,118
- 1891 – Par, 13,484
- 1892 – Redruth, 18,793
- 1893 – Liskeard, 13,067
- 1894 – Falmouth, 18,316
- 1895 – Wadebridge, 16,342
- 1896 – St Ives, 13,040
- 1897 – Lostwithiel, 9,398
- 1898 – Penzance, 17,689
- 1899 – Launceston, 12,838
- 1900 – Truro, 14,560
- 1901 – Bodmin, 14,887
- 1902 – Camborne, 9,508
- 1903 – St Austell, 19,370
- 1904 – Falmouth, 16,287
- 1905 – Newquay, 13,055
- 1906 – Redruth, 20,320
- 1907 – Liskeard, 12,648
- 1908 – Helston, 17,370
- 1909 – St. Columb, 15,757
- 1910 – St Ives, 14,250
- 1911 – St Austell, 18,157
- 1912 – Penzance, 21,454 (the following citation applies to the entries for 1889 to 1912)
- 1930 – Liskeard
- 1931 – St Columb
- 1932 – Penryn
- 1933 –
- 1960 – 2019 – Wadebridge
- 2020 – Postponed due to the COVID-19 pandemic
- 2021 –
- 2022 – 120,671
- 2023 – 118,201
