= Perch Garage murders =

2003 murder case in Cornwall, England

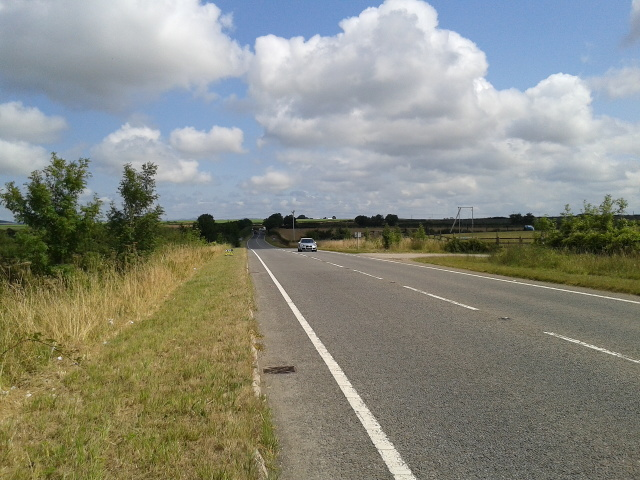
- The A39 road (Atlantic Highway) near where the Perch Garage once stood
- Location: Perch Garage, Wadebridge, Cornwall England
- Date: 5 November 2003 c. 10pm GMT (GMT)
- Attack type: Double murder
- Weapon: Shotgun
- Deaths: 2
- Victims: Carol and Graham Fisher
- Perpetrator: unknown
- Motive: Robbery

On 6 November 2003, Cornish couple Carol and Graham Fisher were found murdered at their home and business they ran near Wadebridge in Cornwall. It has been described as one of Cornwall's most notorious murders.

== Background ==
Graham and Carol Fisher, aged 60 and 53, were a married couple who ran the Perch Garage at the eponymous Winnard's Perch on the A39 road Atlantic Highway from Wadebridge. The couple had owned the garage and car repair centre for about 20 years. At the time of their deaths the couple had recently celebrated their silver wedding anniversary.

== Murders ==
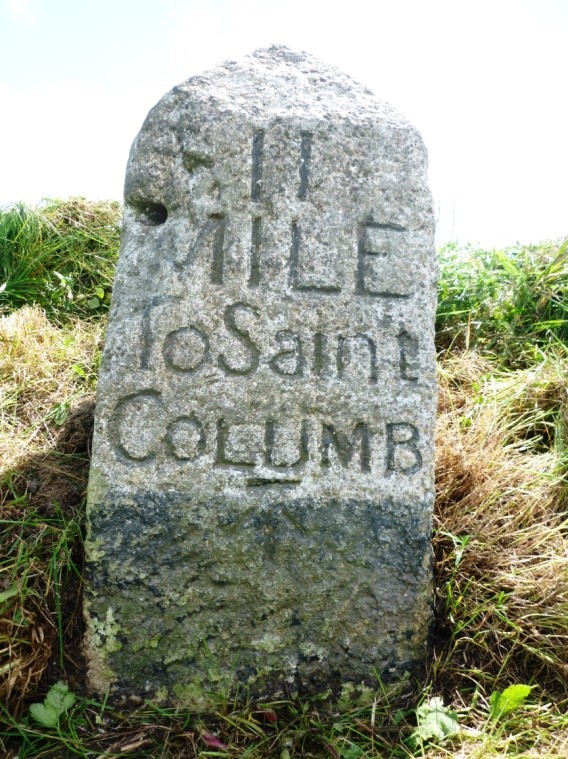
Old Milestone by the A39, north east of Winnard's Perch

The bodies of Carol and Graham Fisher were discovered at the Perch Garage on the A39 road near Wadebridge. At 9AM on 6 November the body of Carol Fisher was found on the path outside their bungalow by a school bus driver. An armed response team found the body of her husband Graham in their bungalow behind the garage they owned.

It was thought that the couple had been bludgeoned with a sledgehammer and shot to death at close range the evening before, which was Guy Fawkes Night. The dining room table was set for an evening meal, the television was switched on and dinner was burnt in the oven. The gunshots reportedly "sounded like fireworks", which was consistent with it being Guy Fawkes Night.

The Fishers' garage, was described as the scene of "indescribable horror" by the judge at Exeter Crown Court. Mr Fisher was found dead from three shotgun wounds in the kitchen of the home. His wife had apparently been shot in the hand, and left a trail of blood through their bungalow before being shot in the back and the neck as she tried to flee down the garden path. The blood of Mrs Fisher was found on the telephone in the living room and it appeared she had tried to ring 999, but she misdialled and the call never got through. Money was found in safe suggesting the perpetrators had fled.

Police warned that the level of violence used suggested the killers could offend again. In December 2003, retired detectives were called in by Devon and Cornwall Police to deal with the "unprecedented" number of incidents in the year of 2003.

The funeral of the couple was held on 5 August 2004 at the parish church in St Issey. In March 2006, the garage was put up for sale. In 2007 the site was cleared for redevelopment. The site is now home to an art gallery, café and shops.

== Investigation ==
On 29 December 2003 police found two shotguns buried on the beach at Weston-super-Mare. The guns were consistent with those used in the murders and were soon linked to the defendants by fingerprints and DNA evidence. In December 2003, a £10,000 reward was offered by Crimestoppers UK for information surrounding the case.

Passengers on a National Express Coach which passed the garage on the night of the murder was considered by police to be a possibility for important witnesses. The Royal Air Force were asked to help with the investigation. In April 2004, two people from the St Dennis area were questioned. Two people who were arrested were later released.

In May 2004, a reconstruction was broadcast on BBC Crimewatch.

== Trial ==
In late 2005, the murder trial began of Robert and Lee Firkins, two brothers from Weston-super-Mare. On 18 December 2003, the brothers had robbed the B&Q hardware store in Taunton, Somerset. The following day, Lee Firkins was involved in an armed robbery at a petrol station at Fraddon, Cornwall, in which he fired a double-barrelled shotgun at the wall. An inmate claimed in court that Robert Firkins had admitted the murders while on remand.

Craig Mack told Exeter Crown Court that his step-brother Lee Firkins had acted out armed robbery before. The court later heard that the brothers had been high on crack cocaine the night of the killings. The pair had claimed that they were in Cornwall to buy cannabis. The prosecution claimed that the murders had been the result of a robbery gone wrong.

Robert and Lee Firkins were found guilty of murder at Exeter Crown Court. They admitted to the unrelated offences but denied the killings. They were both given life sentences.

== Future developments ==
An appeal was heard in 2008. Their attempt to overturn the convictions was rejected by three judges at London's Court of Appeal.

In 2013, BBC News reported that the key witness in the case had been jailed for being hired as a hitman and carrying out a murder. In 2015, a review into the case was launched by the Criminal Cases Review Commission. In 2017 it was reported that advancement in DNA testing could be used as evidence. In 2018, Lee Firkins was sentenced for a triple assault at Broadmoor Hospital. In 2020, Lee and Robert Firkins were granted an appeal. In 2022, Robert Firkins was given a two-year sentence for "throwing excrement over a prison officer".

== Firkins brothers murder convictions quashed ==
In June 2023, it was reported that the Firkins were again appealing their convictions. The Court of Appeal quashed their convictions for murder in 2023, and ordered that there be a retrial. In December 2024, the prosecution offered no evidence and the judge entered not guilty verdicts.

== See also ==
- List of unsolved murders in the United Kingdom (2000–present)
