= Sea Mills =

Sea Mills may refer to:

- Sea Mills, Bristol, a western suburb of Bristol, England
- Sea Mills, Cornwall, a grist mill in the late 18th and early 19th centuries on the banks of Little Petherick Creek, powered by flood tidal water, now a house

== See also ==
- Seamill, a village in North Ayrshire, Scotland
- Tide mill, a mill powered by the sea
