= Wadebridge Town Hall =

Municipal building in Wadebridge, Cornwall, England

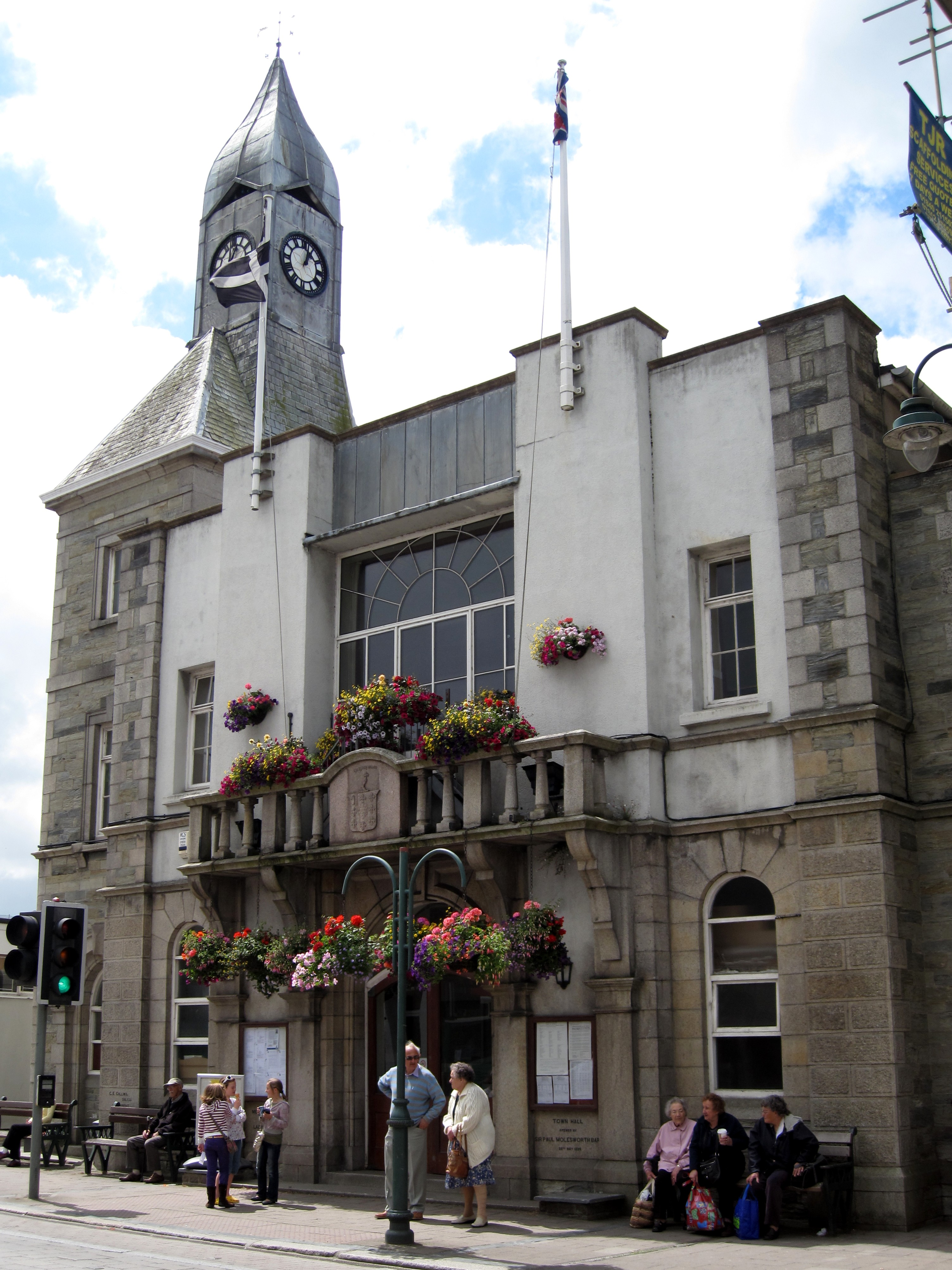
- Wadebridge Town Hall

- Shown in Cornwall
- 50.5158°N 4.8363°W
- Location: The Platt, Wadebridge

History
- Built: 1888

Site notes
- Architect: C. E. Collins
- Architectural style: Gothic Revival style

Wadebridge Town Hall is a municipal building in The Platt, Wadebridge, Cornwall, England. The town hall is currently used as the meeting place of Wadebridge Town Council.

== History ==
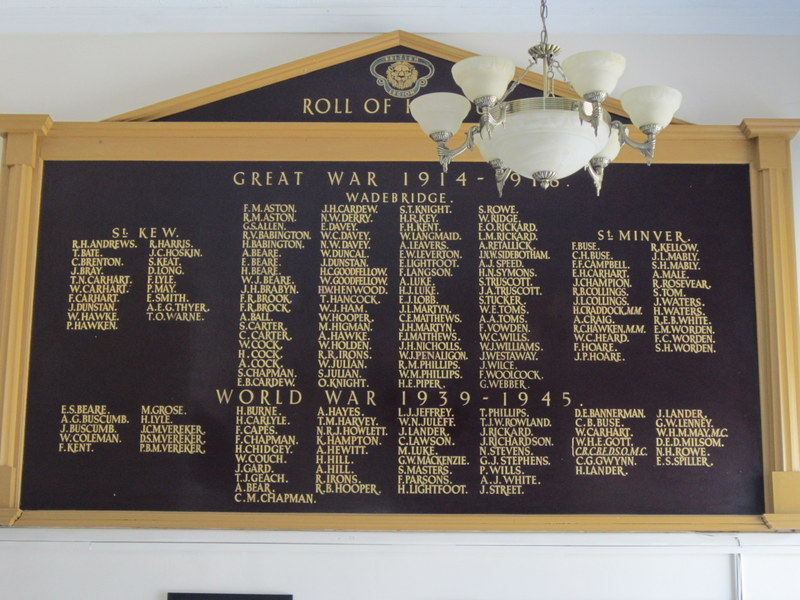
Roll of Honour in the town hall

The construction of the building was an initiative by the local lord of the manor, Sir Paul Molesworth of Pencarrow, to create an events venue in the town. It was built and financed by a specially formed company known as the Molesworth Hall and Exchange Company. The foundation stone for the new building was laid by Lady Robartes of Lanhydrock House on 1 February 1887. (Note: The trowel that Lady Robartes used formed part of the contents of Lanhydrock House when the Agar-Robartes family gave the house to the National Trust in 1953.) It was designed by the War Office architect, C. E. Collins, in the Gothic Revival style, built in slate stone and was officially opened by Sir Paul Molesworth as the Molesworth Hall and Exchange on 23 May 1888.

The design involved an asymmetrical main frontage with five bays facing onto The Platt; the central section of three bays, which projected forward and was faced with a stucco finish, featured a round headed doorway with a keystone flanked by pilasters and brackets supporting a wide stone balcony. There was a large square window on the first floor flanked by two large pilasters supporting flagpoles. The left hand end bay was formed by a three-stage clock tower surmounted by a flèche with clock faces and a weather vane. The other bays were fenestrated by round headed windows on the ground floor and by single windows on the first floor. Internally, the principal room was the main assembly room.

Following significant population growth, largely associated with the status of Wadebridge as a seaport, the area became an urban district in 1898. However, successive local authorities, including Wadebridge Rural District Council and Wadebridge and Padstow Rural District Council preferred to operate from dedicated council offices. A Roll of Honour, intended to commemorate the lives of local service personnel who had died in the First World War was installed in the building in the early 1920s. Thomas Agar-Robartes, 6th Viscount Clifden donated a large stained glass window for installation in the building shortly before he died in July 1930.

In 1945, the building was transferred to a specially formed entity, the Wadebridge Town Trust. It had significantly deteriorated by that time and, in the early 1960s, the local parish council commissioned an extensive programme of refurbishment works at a cost of £20,500. The building was re-opened by the local member of parliament, James Scott-Hopkins, as the Wadebridge Town Hall and Community Centre in August 1962. The local parish council, which was renamed Wadebridge Town Council following local government re-organisation in 1974, established its base in the building. A large mural depicting the construction of the old bridge across the River Camel, which had been painted by Victor Martin Harvey for the Bristol & West Building Society in the 1960s, was relocated to the town hall after the building society closed its branch in the town in the early 21st century.
