= Edmonton, Cornwall =

Hamlet in Cornwall, England

Coordinates: 50°31′10″N 4°52′23″W

Edmonton: Cornish: Trevedmond
- Hamlet
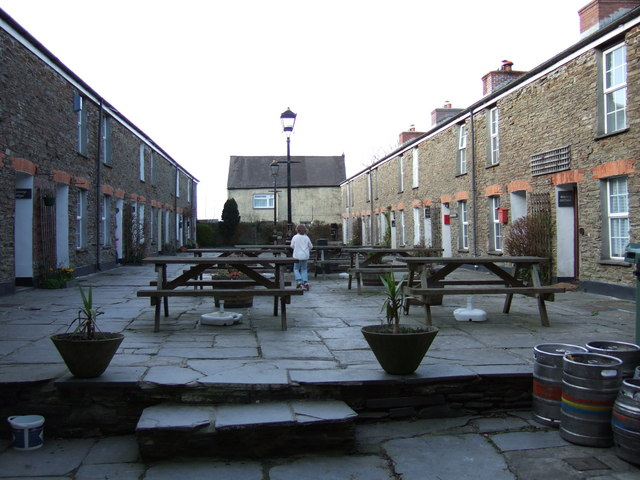
- Converted cottages in Edmonton

- Location within Cornwall
- Unitary authority: Cornwall
- Region: South West
- Country: England
- Sovereign state: United Kingdom
- Police: Devon and Cornwall
- Fire: Cornwall
- Ambulance: South Western

Edmonton (Cornish: Trevedmond, meaning Edmond's farmstead) is a hamlet west of Wadebridge in Cornwall, England. It is in the civil parish of St Breock.
