= Pawton Quoit =

Burial monument south of St. Breock, in Cornwall region, England

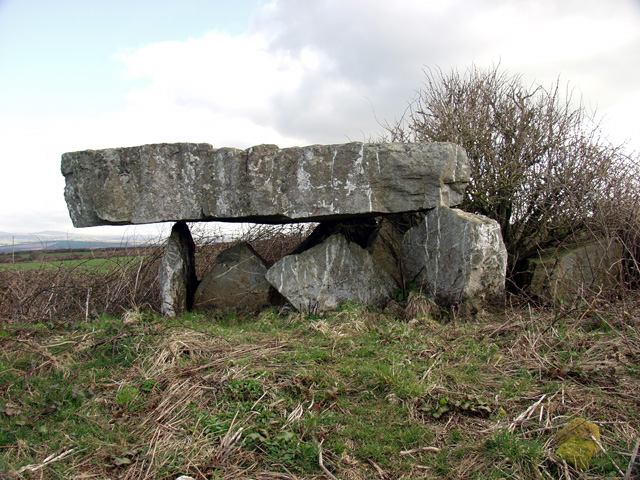
- Remains of Pawton Quoit

- Location within Cornwall
- 50.491244°N 4.869653°W
- Type: Dolmen
- Periods: Neolithic
- Location: St Breock, Cornwall

Scheduled monument
- Official name: Pawton Quoit
- Designated: 26 November 1928
- Reference no.: 430271

Pawton Quoit is a prehistoric portal dolmen, which dates to the Early and Middle Neolithic period in England (3500–2600 BC). The burial monument is located near Haycrock Farm, south of St Breock, in Cornwall, England.

== Description ==
Pawton Quoit is a Neolithic burial tomb located about 4.66 km (2.90 mi) south from St Breock in a field near Haycrock Farm in Cornwall, England. It sits on a north-facing ridge, looking out over the a tributary to the River Camel. The burial monument consists of a long burial mound, measuring 28 by 22 m (92 by 72 ft), and oriented north-south. The barrow was probably originally round, with a lengthening of one axis due to the downhill slope to the north. It has a damaged burial chamber at the south end of the mound. Large stones enclose the rectangular chamber, measuring 2.3 by 1.1 m (7 ft 7 in by 3 ft 7 in). An enormous capstone lies across the chamber, sitting on top on three support stones. Part of the capstone has broken off.

== History ==
A portal dolmen is a closed, single-chamber burial tomb which dates to the Early and Middle Neolithic period in England (3500–2600 BC). It is constructed with two or more vertical megaliths, which are covered by an enormous, flat horizontal capstone. Several portal domens are surrounded by low cairns or platforms. Excavated sites have uncovered cremated human remains, charcoal and pottery fragments. Twenty portal domens have been identified in Britain, the majority of them located in Cornwall and several have been identified in Oxfordshire. Pawton Quoit was first mentioned in historical records when it was recorded as the "Druid's Altar" on the Ordnance Survey map in 1813.
