= Wadebridge School =

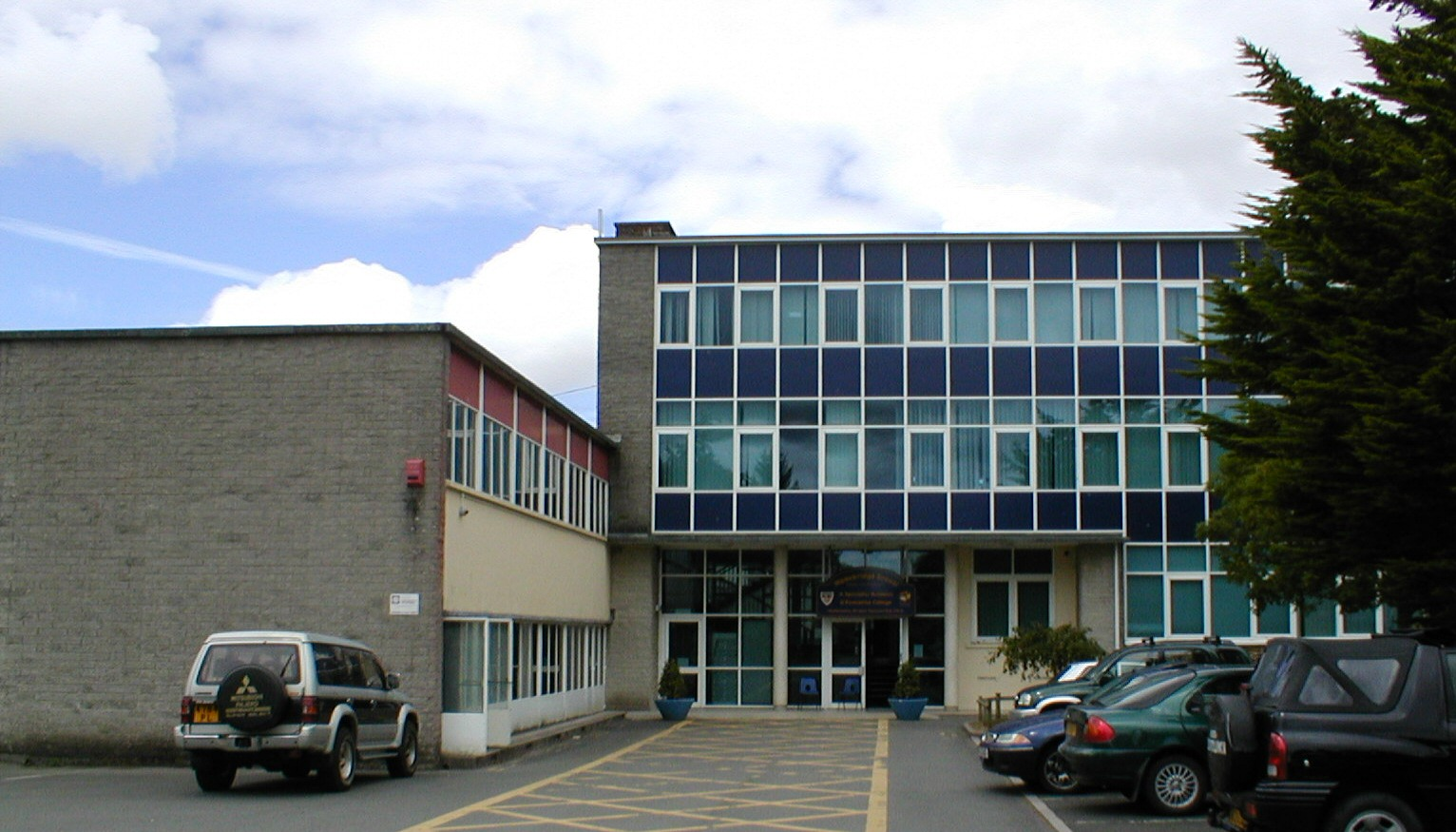

Location
- Gonvena Hill; Wadebridge, Cornwall, PL27 6BU; England; 50°31′19″N 4°49′46″W

Information
- Type: Academy
- Established: March 1957; 69 years ago
- Department for Education URN: 138024 Tables
- Ofsted: Reports
- Head teacher: Steve Simmonds and Kate Goodwin
- Staff: 120
- Gender: Coeducational
- Age: 11 to 16
- Enrolment: 1,235
- Colours: Black and Gold
- Website: www.wadebridge.cornwall.sch.uk

Wadebridge School is a coeducational secondary school with academy status, located in the town of Wadebridge, Cornwall, England. It has 1,050 pupils. The acting headteachers are Steve Simmonds and Kate Goodwin.

Facilities include gymnasium, tennis courts, football/rugby pitch, hockey pitch, basketball court, a squash court and heated swimming pool (part of Wadebridge Leisure Centre).

== History ==
The school opened as Wadebridge Secondary Modern School in March 1957. The building was designed by F. K. Hicklin, county architect.

In 2004, the school gained specialist business and enterprise college status.

Wadebridge converted to academy status in April 2012.

In 2020, the school closed its sixth form.

== A-Level results ==
Although the school no longer has a sixth form, in 2006 the school came in second place behind Truro High School in the league tables for the average A-level points score per student in Cornwall. This meant that Wadebridge School beat the independent and selective Truro School into third place, a feat that was achieved again in 2008.

== Ofsted inspections ==
As of 2021, the school's most recent inspection by Ofsted was in 2019, with a judgement of Good.

== Notable former pupils ==
- Olly Barkley, England rugby international
- Michaela Breeze, weightlifting Commonwealth champion
- Jago, children's book illustrator
- Calum Jarvis, swimming Commonwealth bronze medallist, Olympic Gold 2020(2021)
- Tristan Stephenson, mixologist and bartender
- Annabel Vernon, World Champion GB rower
