= Tregonce =

Tregonce is a hamlet in the parish of St Issey, Cornwall, England, United Kingdom. It is one mile southeast of Padstow on the eastern side of Little Petherick Creek in the Camel Estuary AONB.

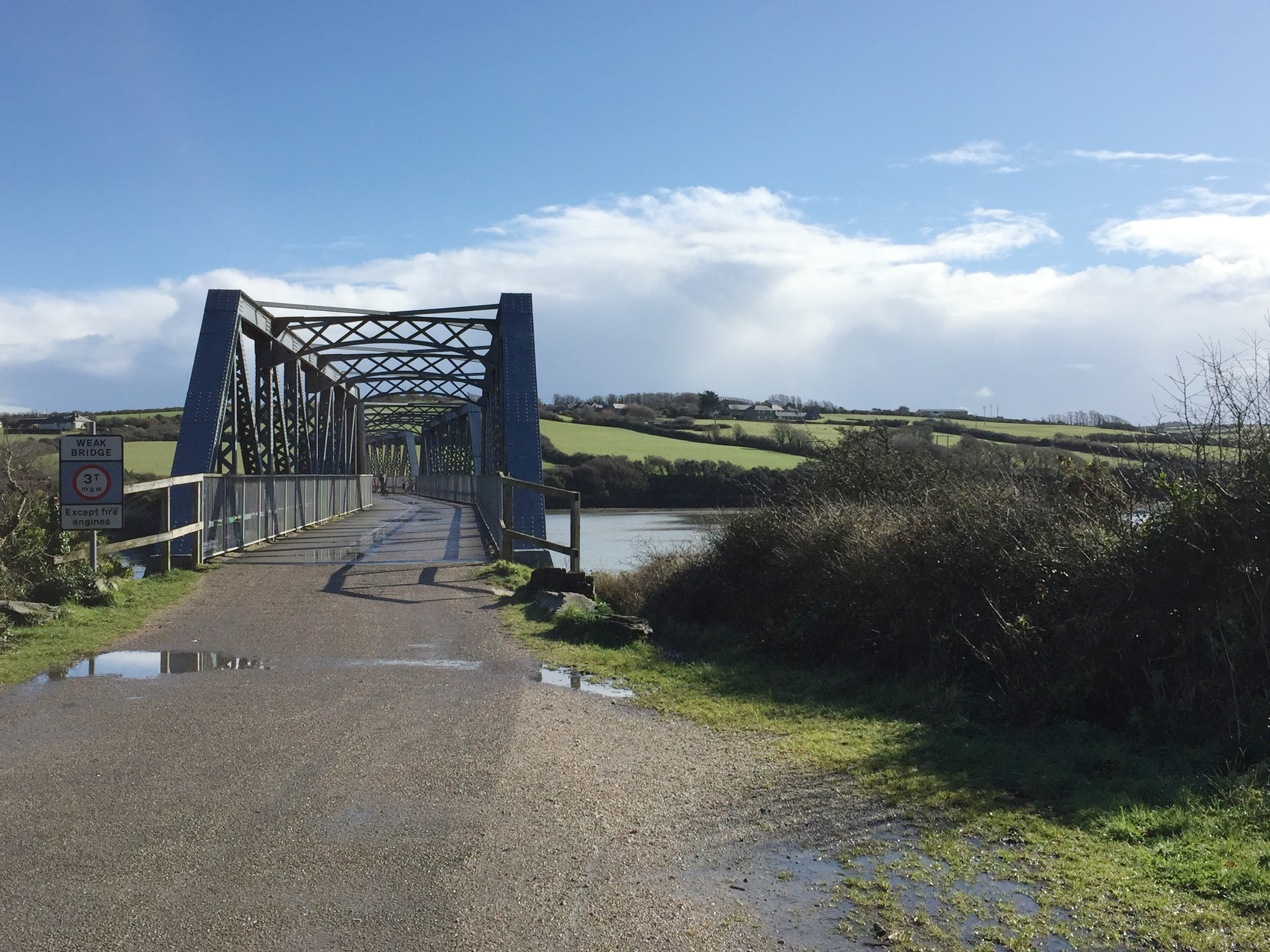
Cornish hamlet of Tregonce viewed from the Camel Trail at Little Petherick Creek Railway Bridge
