= Wadebridge Renewable Energy Network =

Wadebridge Renewable Energy Network (WREN) based in Wadebridge, Cornwall, is a grass roots social enterprise aiming to transform the area into the first solar powerered and renewable energy powered town in the UK. The group plans to install 1 MW peak capacity of solar panels; with ten installations already in place and another ninety planned they hope to generate at least a third of its electricity from solar and wind power by 2015.

The WREN Steering Group consists of residents, councillors from Cornwall Council and Wadebridge Town Council, together with representatives of the Wadebridge Chamber of Commerce.

The scheme could also generate £450,000 a year for the town with money coming from a Feed-in tariff which offers a premium price for renewable energy. The county council has granted planning permission for four new solar farms and sent plans for a further five out for consultation. In February 2012 the WREN project was awarded £68,000 as part of the coalition Government's Local Energy Assessment Fund and in May 2012 won an award for Best Third Sector Business in the 2012 Cornwall Business Awards.

In 2013 Stephen Frankel (chairman of WREN) was named South West Sustainable Energy Champion at an award ceremony in Bath.
