= Little Petherick =

Coordinates: 50.512°N 4.937°W

Little Petherick: Cornish: Nansfenten
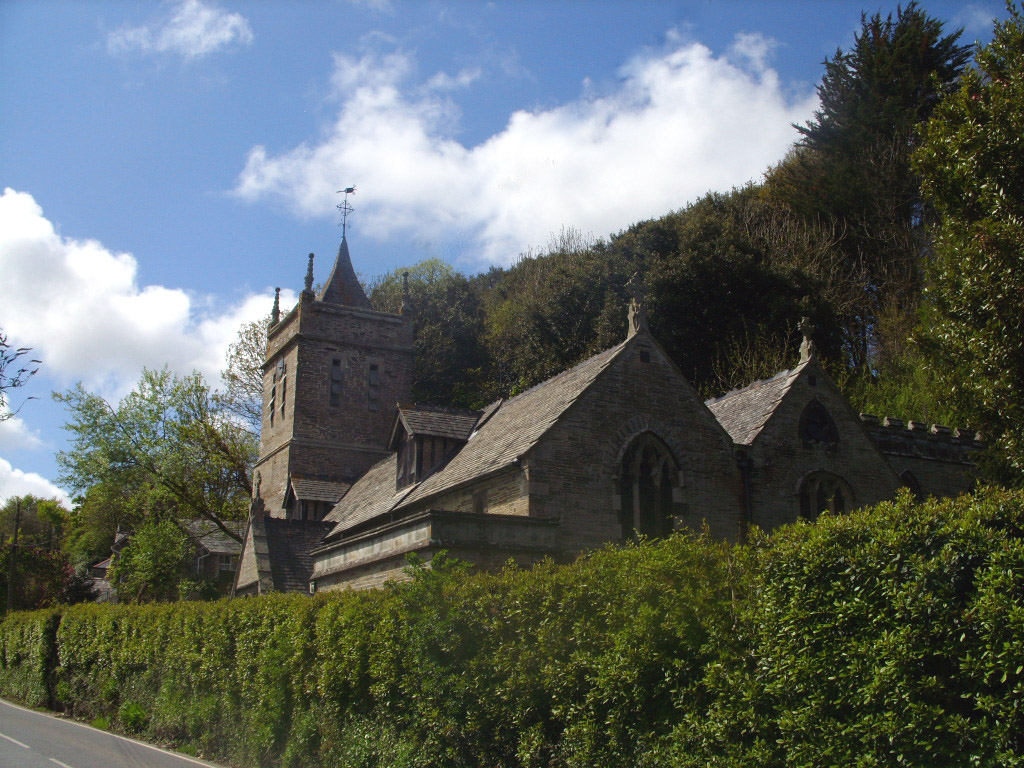
- Little Petherick Church

- Location within Cornwall
- OS grid reference: SW 917 721
- Civil parish: St Issey
- Unitary authority: Cornwall
- Ceremonial county: Cornwall
- Region: South West
- Country: England
- Sovereign state: United Kingdom
- Post town: WADEBRIDGE
- Postcode district: PL27
- Dialling code: 01841
- Police: Devon and Cornwall
- Fire: Cornwall
- Ambulance: South Western
- UK Parliament: North Cornwall
- Councillors: Stephen Rushworth (C, St Issey and St Tudy)

Little Petherick (Cornish: Nansfenten) is a village and former civil parish, now in the parish of St Issey, in north Cornwall, England, United Kingdom. It is situated two miles (3.2 kilometres) south of Padstow and 6 miles (9.7 kilometres) west of Wadebridge. Little Petherick lies in the valley of Little Petherick Creek, a tidal tributary of the River Camel: however, upstream of Little Petherick the creek ceases to be tidal. The village straddles the A389 Wadebridge-Padstow road which crosses the creek at the east end of the village on a Grade II listed 19th century bridge. In 1931 the parish had a population of 178. On 1 April 1934 the parish was abolished and merged with St Issey.

== Parish church ==
The parish church of St Petroc, at grid reference SW 919 721, was restored in 1858 by the Victorian architect William White. It was originally built in the 14th century and is now Grade I listed. (John) Athelstan Riley (1858–1945) was patron of this church and a notable benefactor, responsible for employing Ninian Comper to restore it in 1908: his work includes the high altar, reredos and rood screen. Other features of interest are the monuments to Sir Roger de Lemporu, 13th century, and Andalusia, the Hon. Mrs. J. A. Riley, née Molesworth (d. 1912), ca. 1916; the Flemish 17th century relief in the north chapel. Arthur Mee was impressed by the beauty of this bronze monument.

The official name of the parish is St Petroc Minor (distinguishing it from Padstow or Petrockstow). According to tradition St Petroc passed this way before settling at Bodmin. The parish was until 1830 a Bishop's peculiar and within the episcopal manor of Pawton. The church was rebuilt in 1745 and the Molesworth family have since been notable benefactors.

== Mining ==
A copper mine at Creddis was a small scale venture in Little Petherick. The shaft at Creddis was no deeper than thirty fathoms (55 m) and employed about forty men. Adjoining Creddis, but in the parish of St Issey, was the copper mine of Legossick. This had a steam engine on it, being a large adventure, it employed many men. There were a few mines of this sort in the area; and one, Wheal Paynter showed a course of lead at twelve fathoms (22 m).

There were a number of small quarries along the creek. Several were on the east bank near Trevorrick and Tregonce, while there was one directly on the foreshore at Sunnycorner, where Chalcedony has been found on the low cliff nearby.

== Little Petherick Creek ==
The village gives its name to the tidal creek of the River Camel, the location most likely being chosen as the highest navigable point with evidence of quays here still being visible.

Between Little Petherick and the River Camel is Sea Mills. Here a tidal lagoon was created to capture the rising tide, the outflow being diverted via a tide mill used to grind flour.
