= Wadebridge =

Town in Cornwall, England

Coordinates: 50.517°N 4.835°W

Wadebridge: Cornish: Ponswad
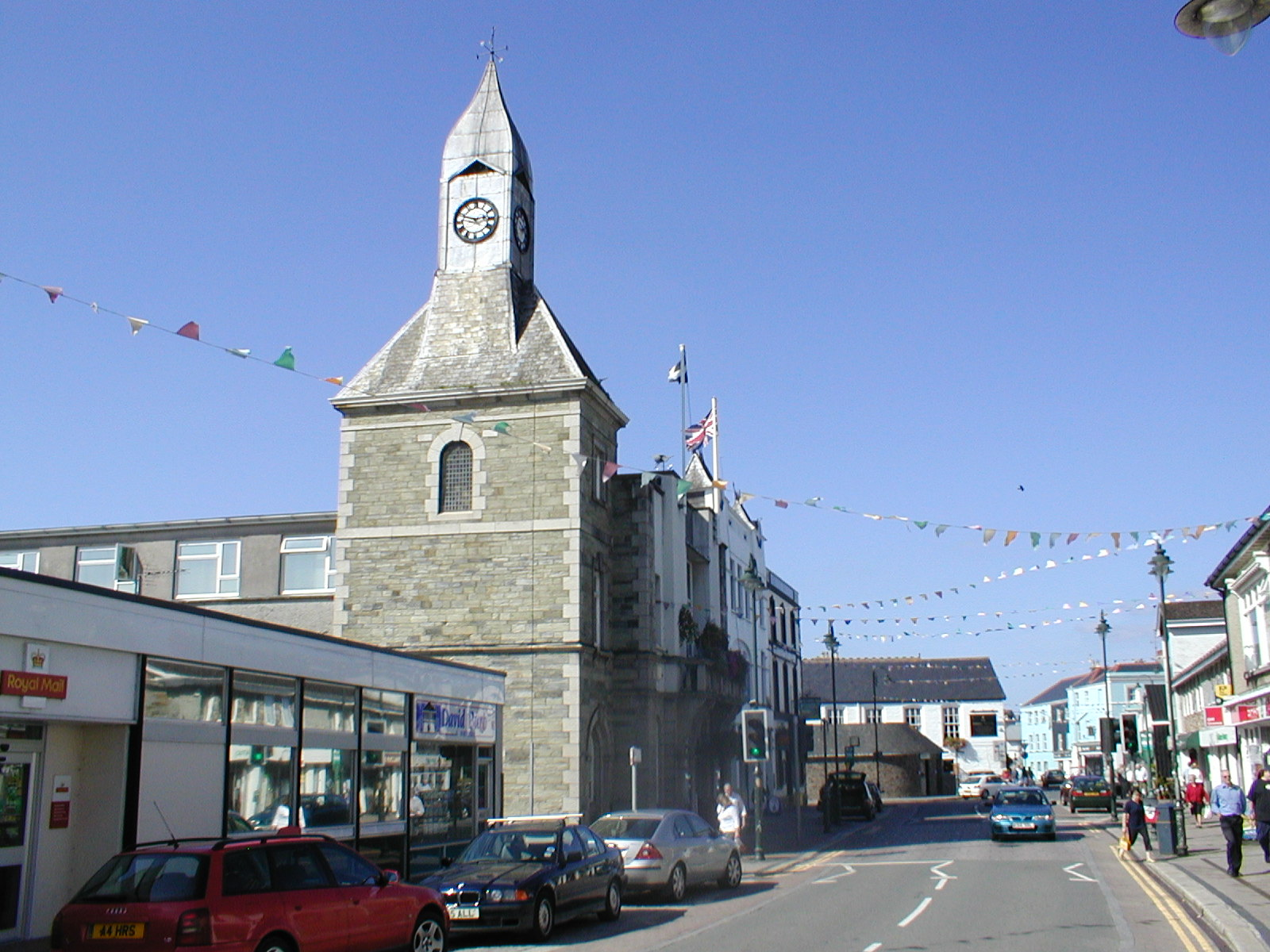
- Looking along The Platt towards Wadebridge Town Hall

- Location within Cornwall
- Population: 6,811 (Parish, 2021); 5,625 (Built up area, 2021)
- OS grid reference: SW990725
- Civil parish: Wadebridge
- Unitary authority: Cornwall
- Ceremonial county: Cornwall
- Region: South West
- Country: England
- Sovereign state: United Kingdom
- Post town: WADEBRIDGE
- Postcode district: PL27
- Dialling code: 01208
- Police: Devon and Cornwall
- Fire: Cornwall
- Ambulance: South Western
- UK Parliament: North Cornwall

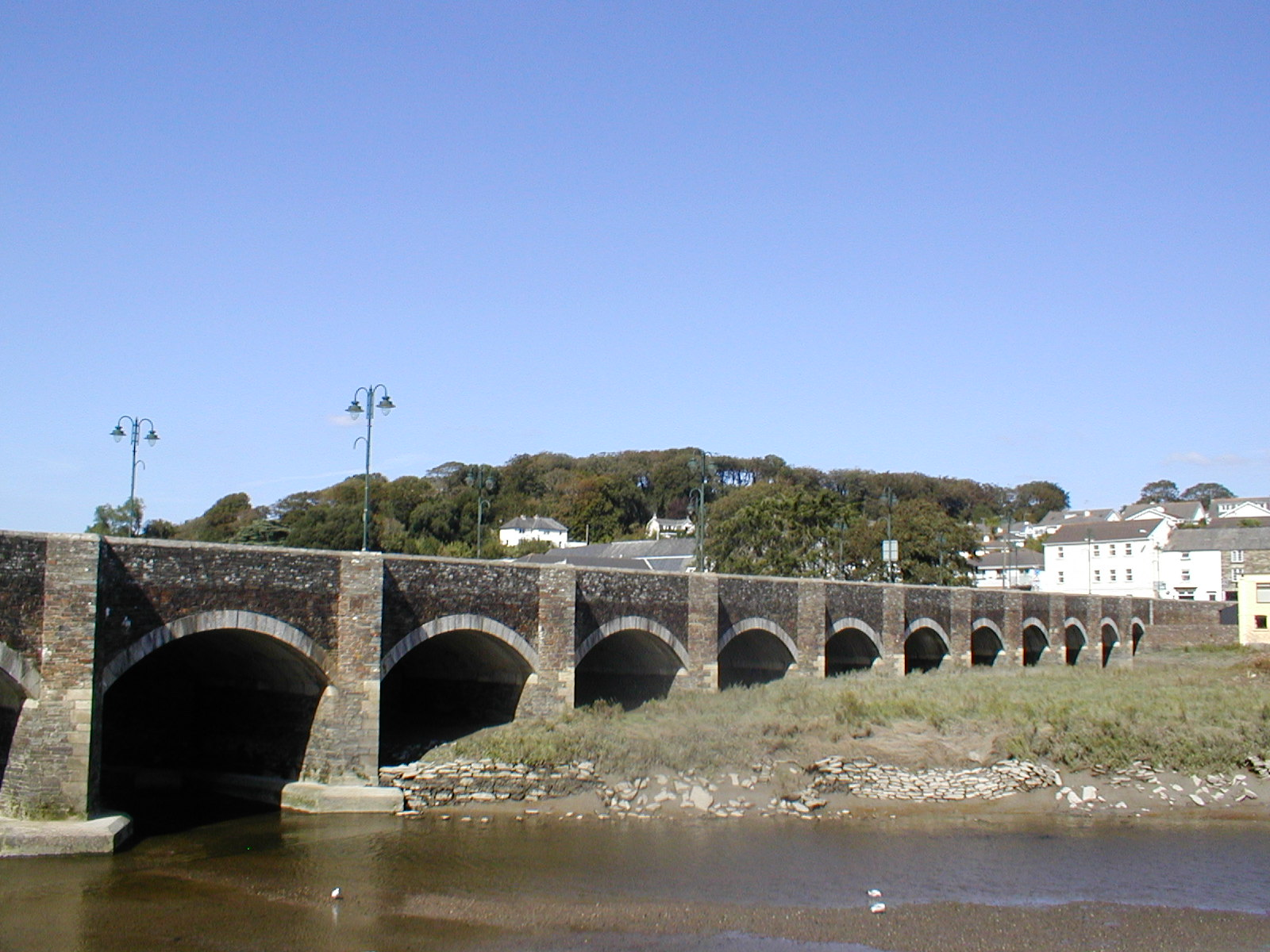
The Old Bridge

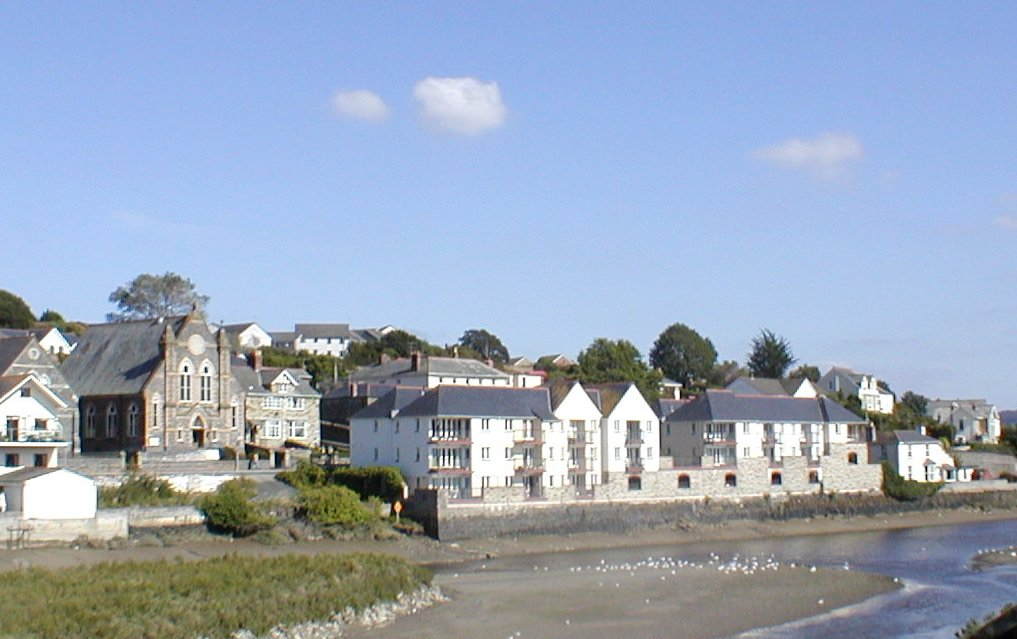
Looking towards the Methodist church from the bridge

Wadebridge (/weɪˈbrɪdʒ/; Cornish: Ponswad [ˈpɔnzwad]) is a town and civil parish in north Cornwall, England, United Kingdom. The town straddles the River Camel five miles (eight kilometres) upstream from Padstow. At the 2021 census the population of the parish was 6,811 and the population of the built up area as defined by the Office for National Statistics (which excludes the Egloshayle part of the parish) was 5,625.

Originally known as Wade, it was a dangerous fording point across the river until a bridge was built here in the 15th century, after which the name changed to its present form. The bridge was strategically important during the English Civil War, and Oliver Cromwell went there to take it. Since then, it has been widened twice and refurbished in 1991.

Wadebridge was served by a railway station between 1834 and 1967; part of the line now forms the Camel Trail, a recreational route for walkers, cyclists and horse riders. The town used to be a road traffic bottleneck on the A39 road until it was bypassed in 1991, and the main shopping street, Molesworth Street, is now pedestrianised.

The town has a secondary school where several notable sports-people were educated. The Royal Cornwall Show is a three-day agricultural show held at the nearby Royal Cornwall Showground every June, and the 5-day Cornwall Folk Festival takes place around the August Bank Holiday.

== History ==
=== Early history ===
The initial settlement of Wade (the name of Wadebridge before the bridge was built) came about due to a ford in the River Camel (Camel probably meaning "crooked one"). The early crossing had a chapel on each side of the river, "King's" chapel on the north side and "St Michael's" on the south side. People would pray for a safe crossing at one of the chapels before wading across at low tide, once they had made it the other side they would give thanks to God in the other chapel. In 1312, a licence was granted for a market at Wade by Edward II who also granted two fairs annually; on the feast of Saint Vitalis and at Michaelmas. Wade was part of the parish of St Breock and the river separated it from the neighbouring parish of Egloshayle.

At some time the ford was supplemented by a ferry until the Reverend Thomas Lovibond (the vicar of Egloshayle) became distressed at the number of humans and animals that died during the crossing of the River Camel so he planned the building of a bridge which was completed in 1468. Wade then became known as Wadebridge. When John Leland travelled through Cornwall in the early 16th century he wrote that the piers were resting on packs of wool. Begun in 1468 and completed in 1485, the bridge was traditionally known as the "Bridge on Wool" because it was reputedly built on wool sacks. In fact, however, it has been proven to be founded directly on the underlying bedrock.

The bridge was a strategic position in the English Civil War as in 1646 Oliver Cromwell came with 500 Dragoons and 1,000 horsemen to take the bridge. When the bridge was first completed tolls were charged for its maintenance. In 1853, it was widened from 3 to 5 m (10 to 16 ft). A second widening took place in 1952 and then in 1963 it was again widened taking it to 12 m (39 ft).

=== Railway ===
The Bodmin and Wadebridge Railway from Wadebridge to Wenfordbridge with branch lines to Bodmin and Ruthernbridge was built at a cost of £35,000 following a study commissioned in 1831 by local landowner Sir William Molesworth of Pencarrow. The line was intended to carry sand from the Camel Estuary to inland farms for use as fertiliser. It was opened on 30 September 1834 with the locomotive Camel pulling a train load of 400 passengers (one of the first railways in Britain to carry passengers). When the company ordered its second locomotive it came with a name plate already affixed. It had been named the Elephant as the makers had failed to realise that the first engine had been named after the river and not an animal.

The last passenger train left Wadebridge railway station in 1967 following railway cutbacks. The old railway trackbed is now the Camel Trail, and the Bodmin and Wenford Railway heritage railway runs on part of the route.

=== Quays ===
Wadebridge was the highest navigable town on the River Camel providing the main trade route before the building of the railway, and coasters would bring goods from Bristol and coal from South Wales. Timber was also imported from the Baltic, while stone from inland was sent to destination throughout England. The first locomotives used on the railway were also imported through the quay, being manufactured by Neath Abbey Ironworks, and the railway initially linked with river traffic well having been designed to distribute sand from the river to the local farms via a "sand dock" constructed upstream of the bridge at the point where the Treguddick Brook (Polmorla Brook) flows into the River Camel. This commodity, brought up from Padstow in barges, had previously been taken as far as Michaelstow and Blisland using pack animals.

In 1843 apart from the dock for the barges bringing sand for onward movement there was another dock capable of holding five vessels and construction of a breakwater was considered, while in 1880 there were quays on both sides of the river below the bridge with that on the west bank being served by the railway although the "sand dock" had been filled in by 1895. In the 1900s vessels such as MV Florence brought cargoes including slag (for fertiliser), grain and coal, and flour was also a regular cargo brought from Ranks at Avonmouth. However, in the 1950s the river silted badly so that the ketch Agnes was possibly the last vessel to bring cargo to Wadebridge when she was recorded there in 1955.

=== Eddystone Road ===
In 1877, after cracks appeared in the rock on which the Eddystone Lighthouse was positioned, a new lighthouse was commissioned from James Nicholas Douglass. Granite quarried from De Lank quarry was brought down to Wadebridge where stonemasons dovetailed each segment of stone not only to each other but also to the courses above and below. As each layer was completed and checked to fit with the layer above, it was sent out to the Eddystone rocks by sea. The lighthouse was completed in 1882. This resulted in the road where the masons worked being called Eddystone Road.

=== World War I ===
During World War I Wadebridge was home to refugees from the Netherlands and Belgium. In order to support them, a property in Park Street was converted into a Calvinist chapel.

=== World War II ===
Despite the rural nature of the area and the lack of military installations, during World War II there was a single recorded air raid when three bombs were dropped on the hill above Fernleigh Road. Residents report hearing the bombs whistling as they fell and landed in a field above the nearest houses. There were no casualties and only minor damage.

=== 20th century ===
The boat building firm of Chapman and Hewitt was established on Trevilling Road in 1971.

=== 21st century ===
In 2003, the Perch Garage murders occurred outside the town on the A39 road (Atlantic Highway).

== Geography ==
The town straddles the River Camel, 5 miles (8 km) upstream from Padstow; the town centre being on the west bank of the river.

On St. Swithin's day 1965, there was a flood in Wadebridge town centre after 5.5 inches (14 cm) of rain fell in 4.5 hours around high tide. The Swan Hotel on The Platt was flooded to a depth of 18 inches (46 cm).

== Government ==
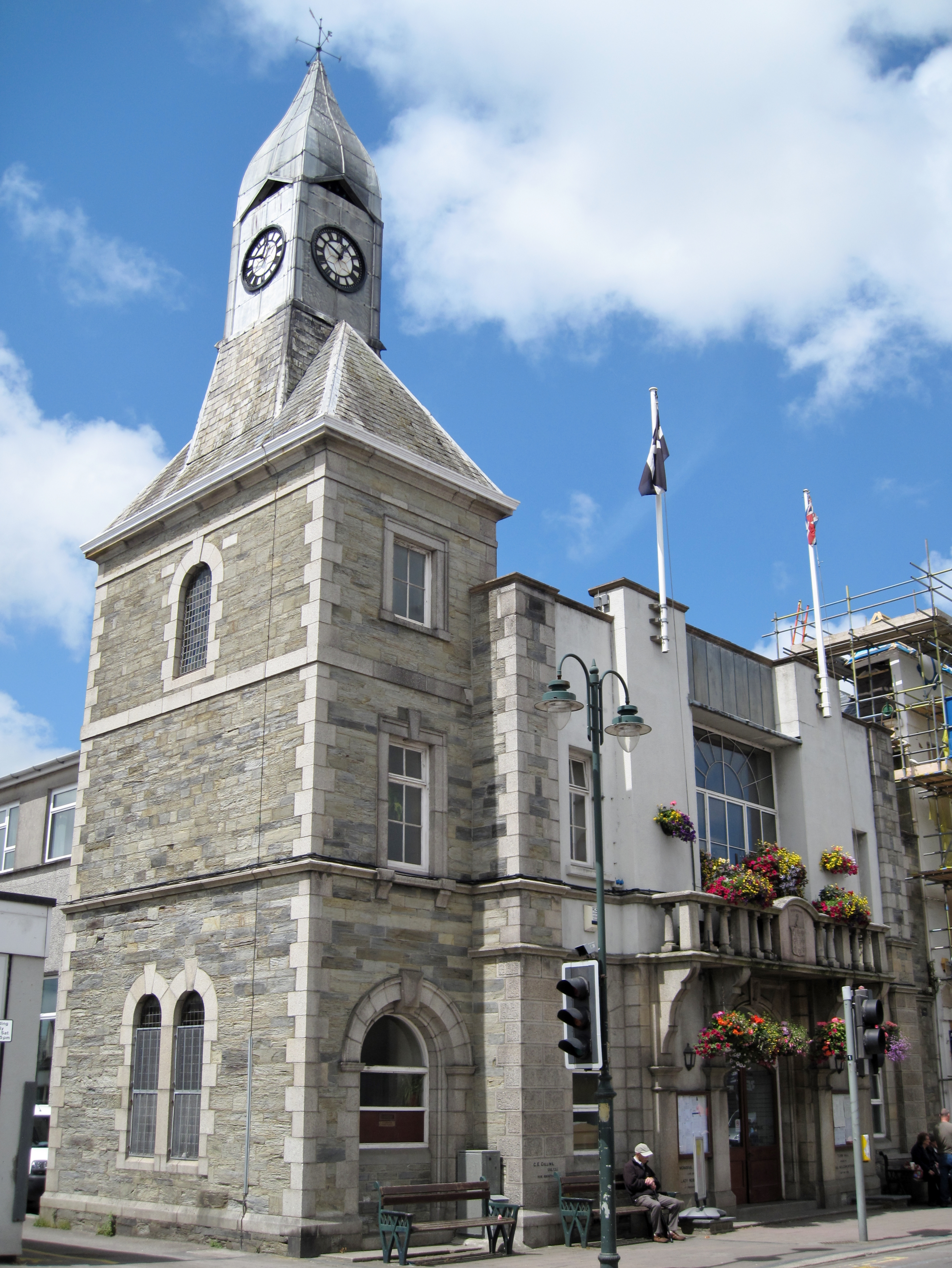
Wadebridge Town Hall, The Platt

There are two tiers of local government covering Wadebridge, at parish (town) and unitary authority level: Wadebridge Town Council and Cornwall Council. The town council is based at Wadebridge Town Hall on The Platt. The Town Hall was originally known as the Molesworth Hall, and was opened by Sir Paul Molesworth on 23 May 1888.

Wadebridge is in the North Cornwall constituency, which is currently held by the Liberal Democrat MP Ben Maguire.

=== Administrative history ===
Wadebridge historically straddled the parish of St Breock in Cornwall's Pydar Hundred (west of the River Camel) and the parish of Egloshayle (east of the Camel) in the Trigg Hundred. When elected parish and district councils were established under the Local Government Act 1894, Egloshayle parish was included in the Bodmin Rural District and St Breock parish was included in the St Columb Major Rural District.

Shortly afterwards, it was decided to create a new urban district of Wadebridge, which came into effect on 1 April 1898, taking territory from both St Breock and Egloshayle parishes, including the settlement of Egloshayle itself from the latter.

Wadebridge Urban District was abolished in 1934. Its area was reclassified as a rural parish and given a parish council. The parish was included in the new Wadebridge Rural District, which also covered numerous surrounding parishes. Wadebridge Rural District was replaced in 1968 by the larger Wadebridge and Padstow Rural District.

Wadebridge and Padstow Rural District was abolished six years later in 1974 under the Local Government Act 1972, becoming part of the new North Cornwall district. As part of the 1974 reforms, parish councils were given the right to declare their parishes to be a town and take the title of town council, which Wadebridge Parish Council took, becoming Wadebridge Town Council.

North Cornwall district was in turn abolished in 2009. Cornwall County Council then took on district-level functions, making it a unitary authority, and was renamed Cornwall Council.

== Transport ==
For many years, Wadebridge was a traffic-congested town, through which the route of the A39 trunk road passed; however, in 1991, the Wadebridge bypass was opened, together with the Egloshayle bypass, enabling the two settlements to regain much of their former charm. The main shopping street in Wadebridge (Molesworth Street) has subsequently been pedestrianised through construction of an inner link road, allowing traffic-free shopping.

Local bus services are operated by Go Cornwall Bus and also until February 2026 Kernow, with routes to Boscastle, Bude, Launceston, Port Issac, Padstow and Truro.

Wadebridge no longer has its own national railway station, since its closure in 1967. The nearest is now Bodmin Parkway, on the Cornish Main Line, which is served by services to Plymouth, Cardiff, London Paddington and Penzance.

== Culture and community ==
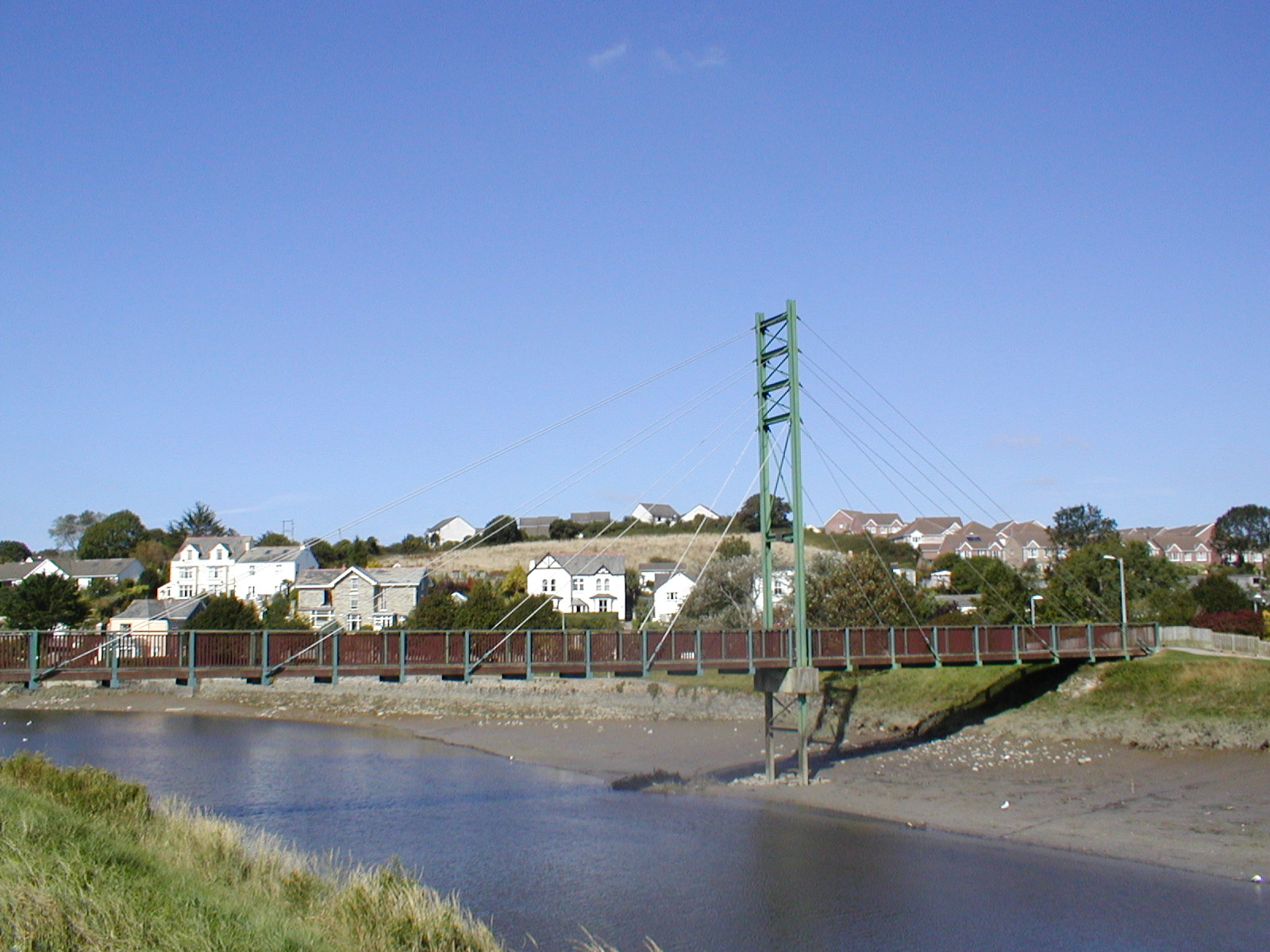
The Challenge Bridge

The Molesworth Arms is one of the oldest Inns in Wadebridge. Previously known as The Fox, The King's Arms and The Fountain, this coaching Inn received its current name in 1817.

Since 2014 the first of the annual events in and around Wadebridge has been the MayPlay festival, a weekend of free children's activities.

The Royal Cornwall Agricultural Show is held at the Royal Cornwall Showground, 1 1/2 miles (2.5 kilometres) west of Wadebridge over three days in early June each year. The show began in 1793 at Bodmin and was then held every year in East and West Cornwall alternately until 1960 when it came to its present site. The showground, run by the Royal Cornwall Agricultural Association, is used for many different functions from Scout Jamborees to point-to-point horse racing.

The Big Lunch, organised by the local chamber of commerce, is a free street party in the pedestrianised part of Molesworth St in the centre of Wadebridge, where around 500–750 people get together to share food, chat, and enjoy music and other entertainment. The idea grew out of a project by the Eden Project, and was started by a former local councillor, Harriet Wild. In 2012 it also served as a celebration of the Queen's Jubilee.

Later in June, the Wadebridge Lions organise a Beer Festival, with brews from across Cornwall, and plenty of live music.

July sees the Rock Oyster Festival on fields just outside the town on the Camel River. Oysters are also available at the event, along with bands from the local area, the South West and further afield.

Wadebridge Carnival is held annually in August, with a Carnival Queen and there is the Eglos Craft Fayre at Egloshayle Church.

The Cornwall Folk Festival, one of the UK's longest-running folk festivals started in 1972, now runs for fives days around the August Bank Holiday. The focus is on contemporary folk music, bluegrass music, Americana (music), celtic music and acoustic music. Sam Lakeman and Sean Lakeman) Geoff Lakeman are the festival's patrons. The festival was featured in the German travel documentary Wunderschön in Spring 2023.

Depending on the tides, the Camel River Festival is held around August or September. The main attraction is a set of raft races on the river, with bar, food, stalls and more live music.

In October, The Bikelights procession through the town centre showcases decorated bicycles and involves many youngsters.

In November the Prime Stock Show and the Garden Produce Association and Chrysanthemum Show are held.

A footbridge called the Challenge Bridge links the Egloshayle playing fields to the Jubilee fields on the other side of the river. The bridge was constructed in 1991 by Anneka Rice and her team for the TV series "Challenge Anneka".

The newspaper is a local edition of the weekly Cornish Guardian.

The town is twinned with Langueux (Langaeg) in Brittany, France.

In April 2013 Wadebridge was short-listed as one of Britain's top eco-towns and is home to Wadebridge Renewable Energy Network a grass roots enterprise aiming to make the town the first solar powered and renewable energy powered town in the UK.

Wadebridge and District Museum opened in 2007 and moved to their current location on Chapel Lane in 2013.

== Demographics ==
The town has two primary schools which have academy status, Wadebridge Primary Academy which OfSTED graded as a ‘GOOD’ school in November 2012 and St. Breock Primary School. There is also a secondary school, Wadebridge School.

There are two health care practices: the Wadebridge and Camel Estuary Practice and the Bridge Medical Centre. There has been a group practice in Wadebridge since the early 20th century; many of the early doctors had their surgeries operating from their homes.

In the 1901 census the population of Wadebridge was 3470, while in 2001 the population was 6222.

== Sport ==
=== Cornish wrestling ===
Wadebridge has been a centre for Cornish wrestling for centuries. Places used for Cornish wrestling tournaments include:

- Bodieve Park, including the Interceltic games in 1965 and 1967.
- Cricket Ground, including the Interceltic games in 2006 and 2008.
- Gonvena Manor House.
- Old Bowling Green, Trevanson Street.

Wadebridge hosted the Interceltic games in 1965, 1967, 2006, 2008 and 2010.

=== Football ===
Wadebridge is home to sporting clubs including Wadebridge Town Football Club who play at Bodieve park, Wadebridge Camels, who play at the Molesworth Field in Egloshayle, and Wadebridge Cricket Club, whose main ground has been in Egloshayle Park since the 1950s. The town has a leisure centre with a programme of sports and pursuits including Cornish wrestling.

=== Other ===
The Camel estuary offers a range of water sports, including sailing, water skiing, windsurfing, surfing and kite surfing. Golf courses close by include Trevose and Saint Enodoc and St Kew.

== Notable people ==
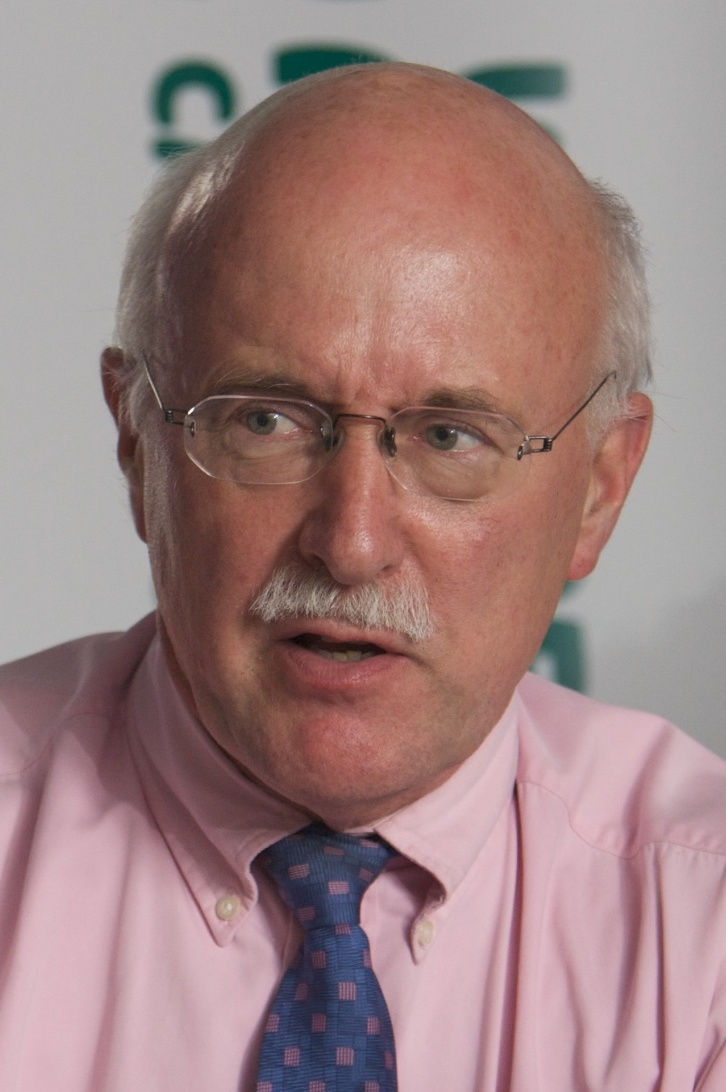
Michael White, 2009

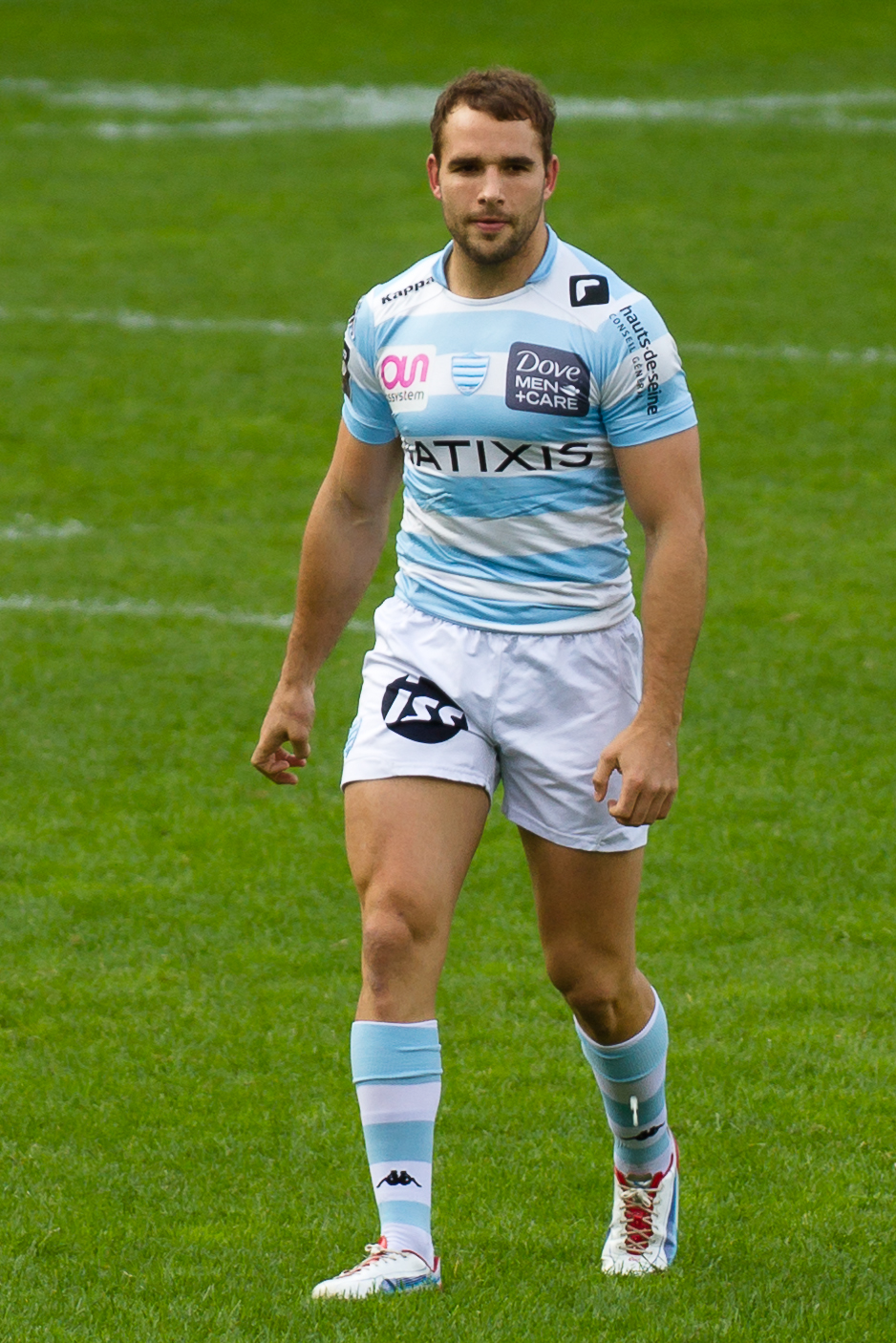
Olly Barkley, 2012

- Sir Goldsworthy Gurney (1793–1875), a gentleman scientist and surgeon who invented the Bude-Light, lived locally from 1814 to 1820. Goldsworthy Way is named after him.
- Thomas Lobb (1817–1894), & William Lobb (1809–1864), botanist brothers collected plants for Veitch Nurseries.
- Francis Hurdon (1834–1914), a prominent figure in Canadian politics, was educated in the town.
- Michael White (born 1945), journalist, associate editor and former political editor of The Guardian.
- Nick Darke (1948–2005), playwright, lobster fisherman, environmental campaigner and chairman of St Eval Parish Council.
- Andrew Ridgeley (born 1963), member of the pop duo, Wham! and his partner Keren Woodward (born 1961), from the group Bananarama, lived in a converted farmhouse near the town, 1990 to 2017.
- Sergeant Steven Roberts (1969–2003), the first soldier to die in the 2003 invasion of Iraq, was born in Wadebridge.
- Scott Mann (born 1977), politician who was the MP for North Cornwall from 2015 to 2024.

=== Sport ===
- John Brown (born 1940), footballer who played 156 games for Bristol Rovers
- Michaela Breeze (born 1979), the Commonwealth weightlifting champion, educated at Wadebridge School
- Olly Barkley (born 1981), rugby union fly-half, played over 320 first class games and 23 for England, was raised in the town
- Annabel Vernon (born 1982), rower, the 2007 World Rowing Champion, Women's Quad Sculls, took part in 2008 Summer Olympics
- Calum Jarvis (born 1992), a Welsh swimmer, team gold medallist at the 2020 Summer Olympics, went to Wadebridge School
- Christian Walton (born 1995), football goalkeeper, has played over 240 games including 85 for Ipswich Town.

== Bibliography ==
- Tuthill, Peter (2004) A Brief History of Wadebridge
- History of Wadebridge Town and Police; by Peter Tuthill
