= Trevance =

Hamlet in Cornwall, England

Coordinates: 50°30′39″N 4°55′08″W

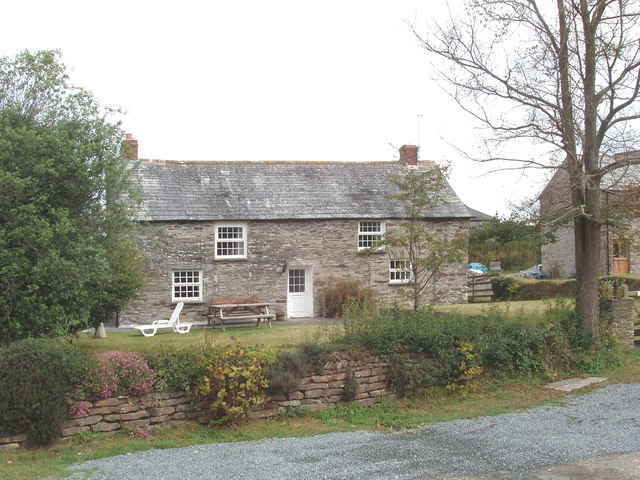
Cottage at Trevance

Trevance is a hamlet east of St Issey, Cornwall, England, United Kingdom.
