= Egloshayle =

Village in Cornwall, England

Coordinates: 50°30′51″N 4°49′17″W

Egloshayle: Cornish: Eglosheyl
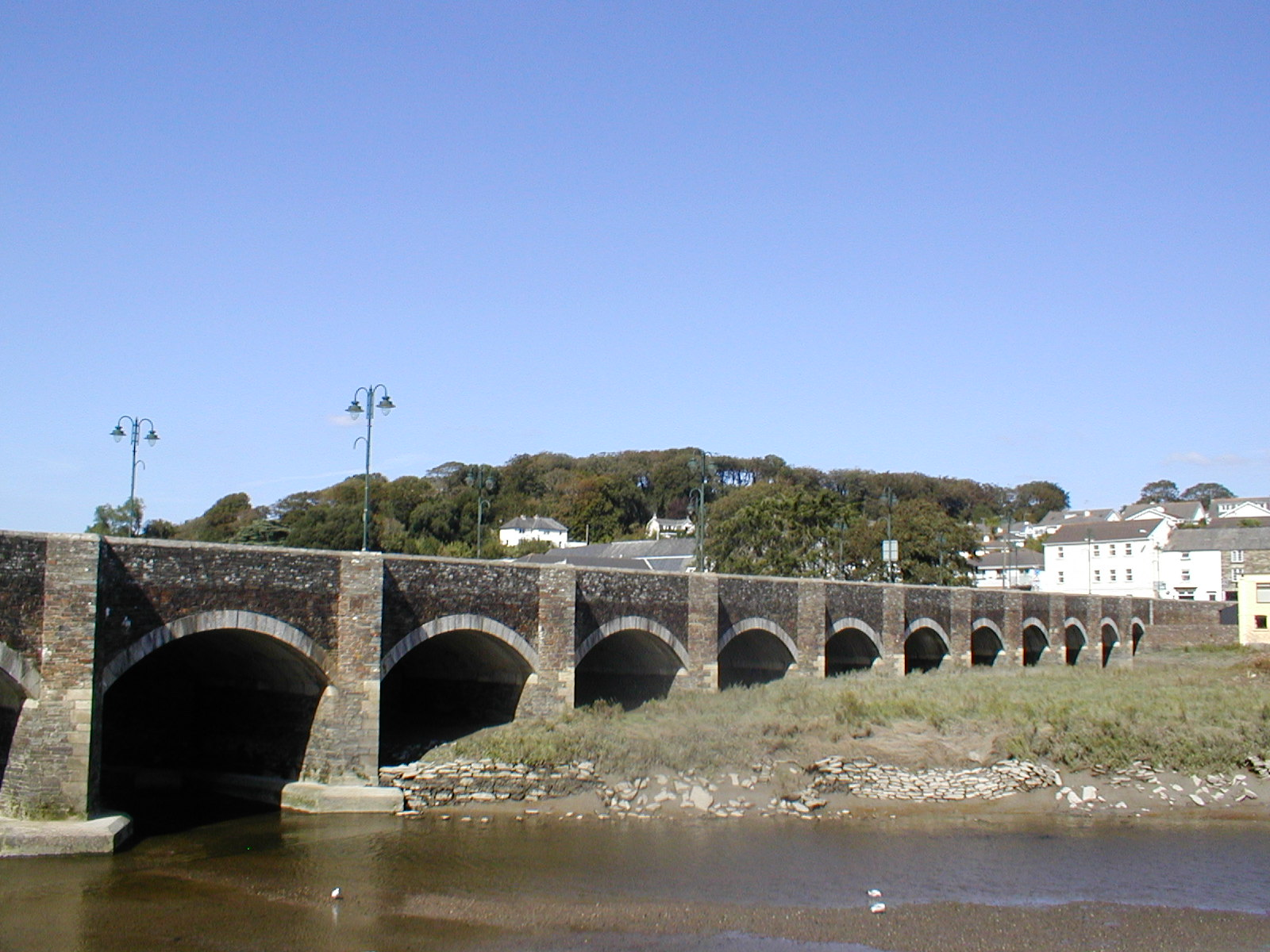
- The Old Bridge at Wadebridge

- Location within Cornwall
- Population: 415 (Parish, 2021)
- OS grid reference: SX001719
- Civil parish: Egloshayle
- Unitary authority: Cornwall Council
- Ceremonial county: Cornwall
- Region: South West
- Country: England
- Sovereign state: United Kingdom
- Post town: WADEBRIDGE
- Postcode district: PL27
- Dialling code: 01208
- Police: Devon and Cornwall
- Fire: Cornwall
- Ambulance: South Western
- UK Parliament: North Cornwall

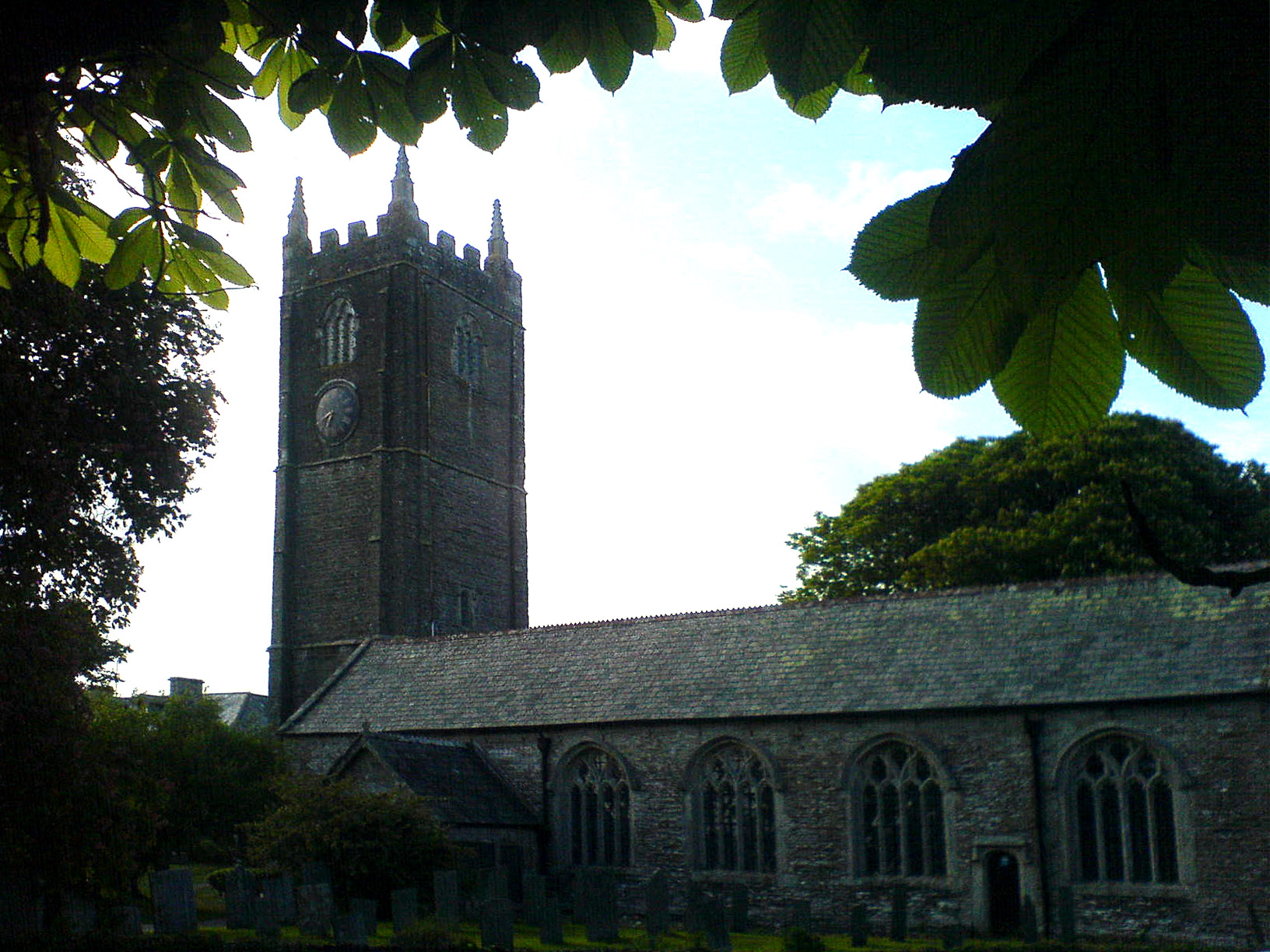
Egloshayle Church.

Egloshayle (Cornish: Eglosheyl, meaning church on an estuary) is a civil parish and village in north Cornwall, England, United Kingdom. The village is beside the River Camel, southeast of Wadebridge. The settlement of Egloshayle itself was removed from the civil parish in 1898 and transferred to the new parish of Wadebridge. Since 1898 the civil parish of Egloshayle has therefore not included the village after which it is named. The civil parish stretches southeast from the village and includes Washaway and Sladesbridge. At the 2021 census the population of the civil parish was 415.

== History ==
Egloshayle was a Bronze Age settlement and later a river port, rivalling Padstow 5 miles (8 km) downriver. The trade consisted of tin, clay, wool, and vegetable crops. Egloshayle is now a residential suburb of Wadebridge.

Wadebridge developed in the parishes of Egloshayle and St Breock. A vicar of Egloshayle named Thomas Lovibond was responsible for the construction of the first bridge across the River Camel to replace a dangerous ford. Begun in 1468 and completed in 1485, the bridge was traditionally, but inaccurately, known as the "Bridge on Wool", as its foundations were said to be wool sacks. The bridge is, in fact, conventionally constructed with its foundations on the river bedrock. It is thought by some local historians, however that the bridge was completed by 1475, by a John Lovibond.

=== Administrative history ===
Egloshayle was an ancient parish in the Trigg Hundred of Cornwall. It historically covered the village of Egloshayle and surrounding rural areas on the east bank of the River Camel, and included the parts of the Wadebridge urban area east of the river. In 1898 a new urban district of Wadebridge was created, and Egloshayle parish ceded the most populous part of the parish around Egloshayle village and Wadebridge to the new urban district. Since 1898, Egloshayle civil parish has therefore only covered the rural parts of the old parish that were not transferred to Wadebridge.

== Churches ==
The parish church, which is Grade I listed, is named after St Petroc and is constructed almost entirely in the Perpendicular style. It has a Norman font, a stone pulpit dating from the 15th century, and also has a fine monument to Dame Barbara Molesworth (ob. 1735). There is a peal of eight bells: the tenor bell weighs 12-1-25.

The Anglican chapel at Washaway, dating from 1883, has a font which is one of the earliest in the county. Arthur Langdon (1896) recorded that there were six stone crosses in the parish, including two in the parish churchyard and one at Washaway. Three-hole Cross is about 1.5 miles (2.4 km) north of Egloshayle at a crossroads. (Another cross is described at Pencarrow.)

The bell-ringers of the village are celebrated in the song The Ringers of Egloshayle. The song has been recorded by, amongst others, the Cornish singer Brenda Wootton.

== Notable buildings and antiquities ==
Local private properties of interest include Pencarrow House (18th century) and Croan House (17th century), each of which have seven bays. Kelly Rounds (or Castle Killibury) is an Iron Age fort on the border of the parish and has been associated with the legend of King Arthur.

One of the houses on the Egloshayle road overlooking the River Camel is Grade II listed.

== Cornish wrestling ==
Cornish wrestling tournaments have been held in Egloshayle at Hingham Mill.

== Notable people ==
Plant collecting brothers William and Thomas Lobb, spent their early life at Egloshayle.

Arthur Hamilton Norway (1859–1938), who became head of the Post Office in Ireland before the First World War, and the father of novelist Nevil Shute, was born in the village.
