= St Jidgey =

Hamlet in Cornwall, England

Coordinates: 50.48°N 4.9°W

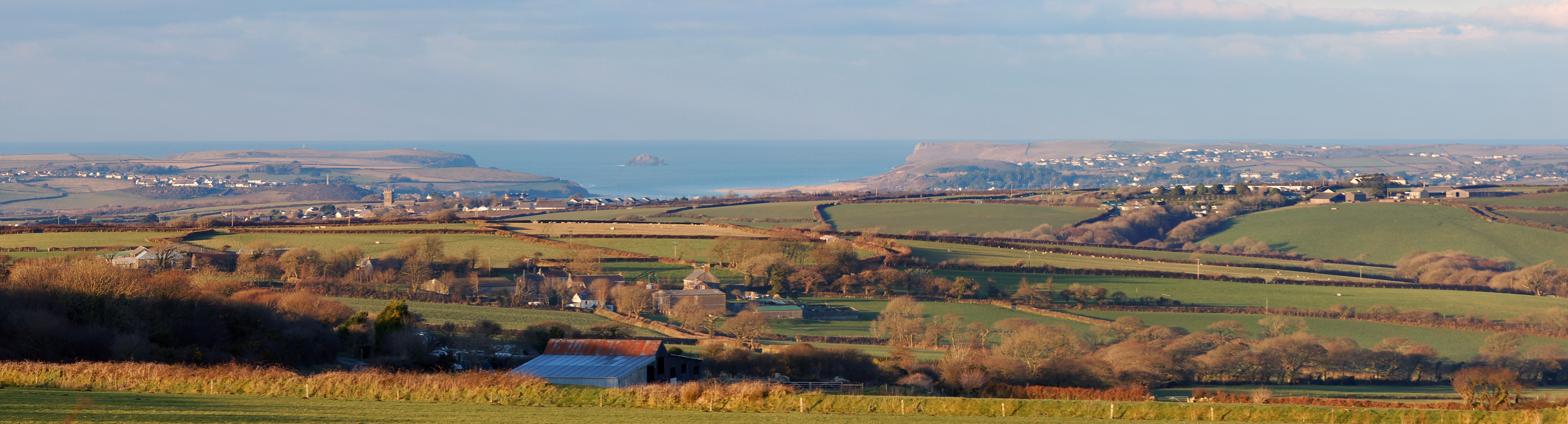

- Location within Cornwall
- Unitary authority: Cornwall
- Ceremonial county: Cornwall
- Region: South West
- Country: England
- Sovereign state: United Kingdom
- Postcode district: PL27
- Police: Devon and Cornwall
- Fire: Cornwall
- Ambulance: South Western
- Councillors: Stephen Rushworth (C, St Issey and St Tudy)

St Jidgey is a hamlet in mid Cornwall, England, United Kingdom. It lies along the A39 road, north of St Columb Major and southwest of Wadebridge. It contains the Halfway House Inn, a coaching inn. The name is recorded as Sentysy in 1517; it is derived from St Ydi (in English St Issey).
