= Treator =

Hamlet in Cornwall, England

Coordinates: 50°32′23″N 4°57′25″W

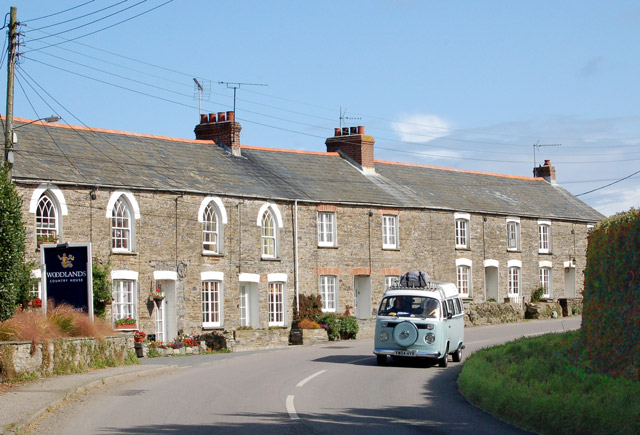
Cottages at Treator

Treator is a hamlet west of Padstow, Cornwall, England, United Kingdom.

It was the birthplace of Sir Goldsworthy Gurney (1793–1875), a surgeon, chemist, lecturer, consultant, architect, builder and prototypical British gentleman scientist and inventor, of the Victorian era.
