= Annabel Vernon =

British rower

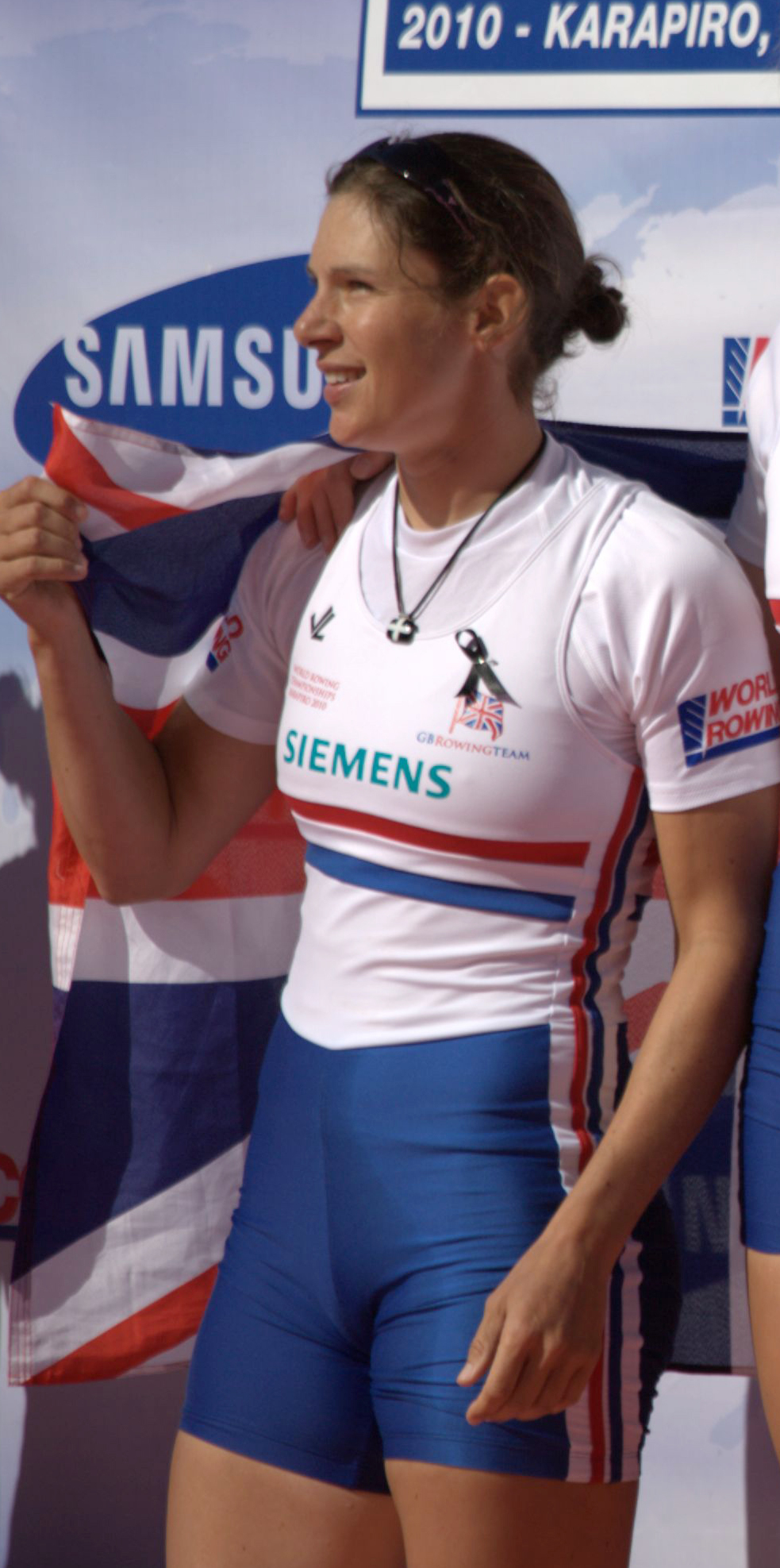
- Vernon in 2010

Personal information
- Born: 1 September 1982 (age 43) Truro, Cornwall, England
Medal record
Representing Great Britain
Women's rowing
Olympic Games
Silver medal – second place	2008 Beijing	Quadruple sculls
World Championships
Gold medal – first place	2007 Munich	Quadruple sculls
Gold medal – first place	2010 Karapiro	Quadruple sculls
Silver medal – second place	2009 Poznan	Double sculls

Annabel Morwenna Vernon (born 1 September 1982) is a retired British rower.

She was born in Truro, Cornwall. She was educated at St Minver Primary School then Wadebridge School, Downing College, Cambridge, and King's College London (MA International Relations).

Vernon started rowing at Castle Dore Rowing Club at Golant in Cornwall when she was 17, influenced by her elder brother and father. She read history at Downing College, Cambridge, where she rowed in the women's Blue Boat in 2003, under the presidency of Ruth de Las Casas. She was a member of Rob Roy Boat Club while in Cambridge, then represented Thames Rowing Club and now rows under Marlow Rowing Club colours.

She represented Great Britain in the Women's Quadruple Sculls at the 2008 Beijing Olympics, winning a silver medal. She was selected to row in the women's eight at the 2012 Summer Olympics. The crew reached the A Final of the event, and finished fifth.

After retiring from active competition she embarked on a journalistic, media and speaking career.

In 2019 she published her first book, Mind Games, with Bloomsbury Publishing, which looks at the psychology of elite sport through a mixture of academic theories and interviews with sports people.

== Achievements ==
- Bronze medal in the pair at the World U23 Championships in Poznań.
- Sixth in the women's single at the 2006 GB Senior Selection Trials in Belgium.

=== World Championships 2005 ===
- Ninth in the single scull.

=== 2006 World Cup Series ===
- Gold in the Double Scull at the Munich World Cup Regatta.
- Fourth in Poznań.
- Silver in Lucerne.

=== World Championships 2006 ===
- Fourth in the Double Scull.

=== World Championships 2007 ===
- Gold in the Quad Scull

=== Beijing Olympics 2008 ===
- Silver in the Quad Scull.

=== World Championships 2009 ===
- Silver in the Double Scull

=== World Championships 2010 ===
- Gold in the Quad Scull
