= Engollan =

Coordinates: 50.489°N 5.014°W

Engollan: Cornish: Hengollen
- Location within Cornwall
- OS grid reference: SW863699
- Civil parish: St Eval
- Unitary authority: Cornwall
- Ceremonial county: Cornwall
- Region: South West
- Country: England
- Sovereign state: United Kingdom
- Post town: WADEBRIDGE
- Postcode district: PL27
- Dialling code: 01841
- Police: Devon and Cornwall
- Fire: Cornwall
- Ambulance: South Western
- UK Parliament: North Cornwall
- Councillors: Stephen Rushworth (C, St Issey and St Tudy)

Engollan (Cornish: Hengollen) is a hamlet 5 miles (8.0 km) south-west of Padstow in Cornwall, England. Engollan is in the civil parish of St Eval.

== Views of Engollan ==
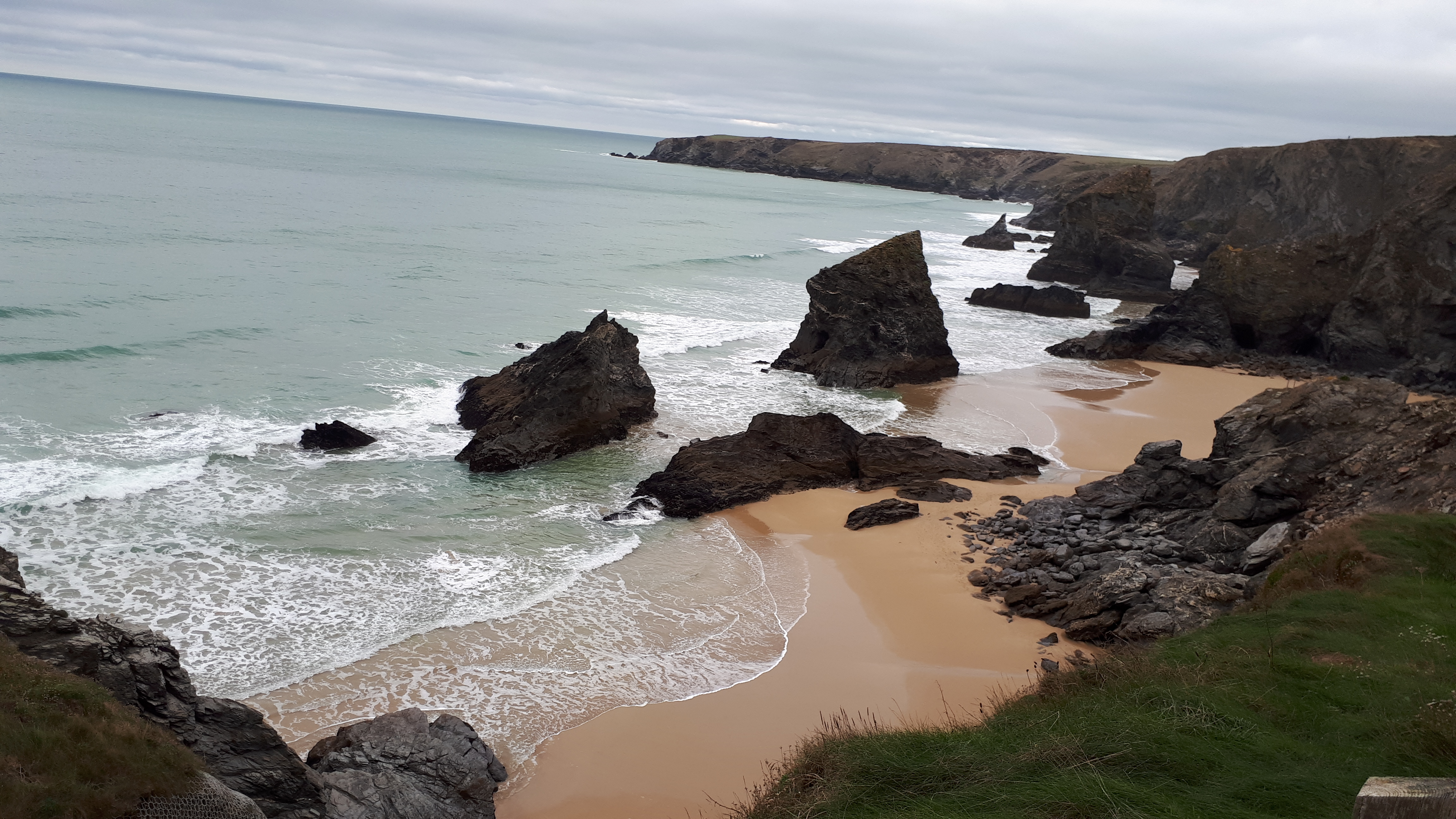
Pentire Steps beach

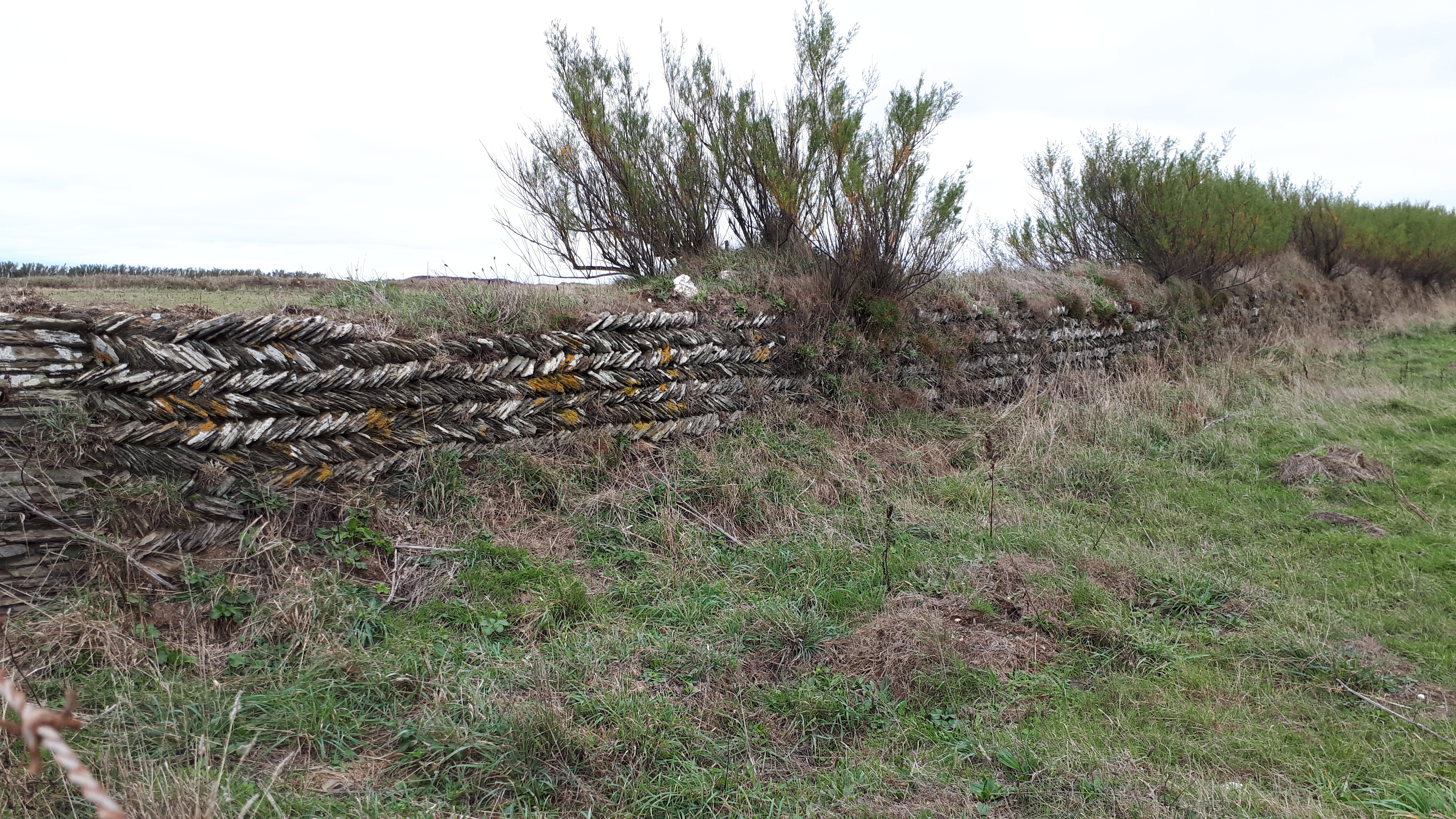
Stone fence on the coastal path
