= St Ervan =

Rural civil parish and hamlet in Cornwall, England

Church of Saint Hermes
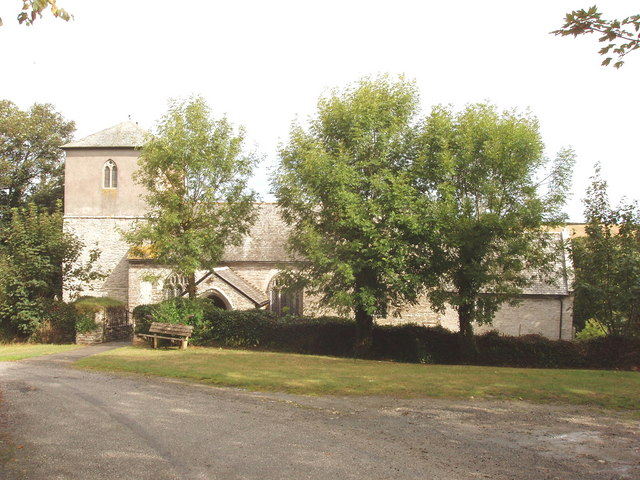

- Location within Cornwall
- 50°29′39.6″N 04°58′25.9″W
- OS grid reference: SW 89176 70283
- Location: St Ervan
- Country: England
- Denomination: Church of England
- Website: Lannpydar.org.uk

History
- Dedication: St Hermes

Architecture
- Functional status: active
- Heritage designation: Grade II* listed
- Designated: 1969

Specifications
- Materials: Slatestone rubble with granite dressings, and Catacleuse stone windows

Administration
- Province: Canterbury
- Diocese: Truro
- Archdeaconry: Cornwall
- Deanery: Pydar
- Parish: St Ervan

Clergy
- Rector: Revd. Helen Baber

St Ervan is a rural civil parish and hamlet in Cornwall, England, United Kingdom. The hamlet is situated three miles (5 km) southwest of Padstow. St Ervan is named after St Erbyn, the original patron of the church, who is said to have been the father of St Selevan. Notable features in St Ervan are the Anglican church, the village hall and the Nonconformist cemetery. The parish population at the 2011 census was 521. In addition to the hamlet of St Ervan, also called Churchtown, the parish incorporates the hamlets of Penrose and Rumford.

== Church ==
The parish church is dedicated to St Hermes and has a very unusual tower which was originally 50 feet (15 m) high and was built in the 14th/15th centuries. The upper part was brought down by explosives in the 1880s, but it was not properly capped until 1956 and now stands 24 feet (7 m) high. The church is in the Lann Pydar joint benefice with: St Eval Church, St Mawgan Church and St Columba's Church, St Columb Major. The church was supported by the Arundell family who lived at the manor of Trembleath as early as 1240.

The English poet, Sir John Betjeman mentioned the church in his poem "Summoned by Bells" (1960), chapter VIII.

=== Monuments ===
There are several notable slate, wall monuments within the church

- Richard Harvey, d. 1666 and Richard Russell, died 1654.
- William Pomeroye, d. 1622 with figure carved in central panel in contemporary dress.
- Humphrey Arthur, died 1676 with floral decoration around a central inscription panel and another slate to his wife Elizabeth.
- Nicholas and Jane Brewer, d. 1642,
- Richard Hare d. 1610, Richard Louis d. 1688, John Tom d. 1647. In the nave
- Two daughters of Walter Piper, d. 1723 and fragment of slate with carved kneeling figures.
- Richard and Eleanora Vivian who d. in 1708 and 1707.

There are also two late 17th-century monuments with columns and entablatures, one in the south transept to Ralph Keate who died in 1672.

== Cemetery ==
St Ervan Nonconformist Cemetery is located on the outskirts of the village on the road toward Penrose. It was opened in 1919 and is used to serve three Nonconformist chapels in the Parish.

=== Monuments ===
St Ervan Parish War Memorial, found at the centre of the cemetery, is a wheel cross set on a tapering shaft with a tapering plinth. Black lettering is used to commemorate the Great War 1914-1919

== See also ==
- Penrose Methodist Chapel
