= Rumford, Cornwall =

Hamlet in Cornwall, England

Coordinates: 50°29′35″N 4°58′00″W

Rumford (Cornish: Resledan, meaning wide ford) is a hamlet in Cornwall, England. Rumford is in the civil parish of St Ervan. The telephone area code for Rumford is 01841.
