= Trevorrick =

Coordinates: 50°31′31.88″N 4°56′9.85″W

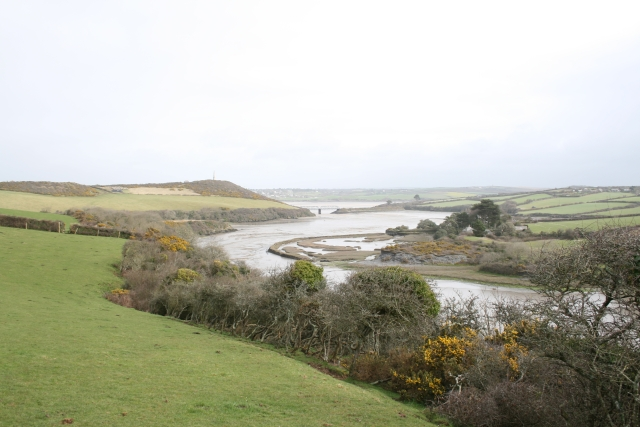
Little Petherick Creek and Sea Mills

Trevorrick is a hamlet near St Issey in north Cornwall, England, United Kingdom. It is located about two miles south of Padstow just to the east of Little Petherick Creek. Half a km north is Sea Mills, a house on the banks of the creek. Sea Mills was a grist mill in the late 18th and early 19th centuries. It was powered by flood tidal water which then drove a water wheel when the tide was on the ebb. The sea walls can still be seen including the sluice gate but the wheel is long gone.
