= St Breock =

Coordinates: 50.511°N 4.854°W

St Breock: Cornish: Nanssans
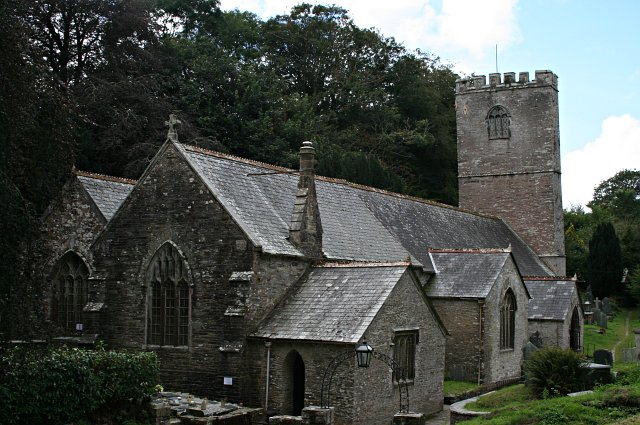
- St Breock Church

- Location within Cornwall
- Population: 734 (United Kingdom Census 2011 including Edmonton and Engollan)
- OS grid reference: SW 978 719
- Unitary authority: Cornwall
- Ceremonial county: Cornwall
- Region: South West
- Country: England
- Sovereign state: United Kingdom
- Post town: WADEBRIDGE
- Postcode district: PL27
- Dialling code: 01208
- Police: Devon and Cornwall
- Fire: Cornwall
- Ambulance: South Western
- UK Parliament: North Cornwall
- Councillors: Stephen Rushworth (C, St Issey and St Tudy)

St Breock (Cornish: Nanssans) is a village and a civil parish in north Cornwall, England, United Kingdom. The spelling St Breoke is used for the ecclesiastical parish but is otherwise out of use.

== Geography ==
St Breock village is 1 mile (1.6 km) west of Wadebridge immediately to the south of the Royal Cornwall Showground. The village lies on the eastern slope of the wooded Nansent valley. The civil parish of St Breock is in Bodmin Registration District and the population in the 2001 census was 703, increasing to 725 at the 2011 census. The parish extends approx five miles (8 kilometres) south of Wadebridge. To the north, the parish is bounded by the River Camel, to the west by St Issey parish, to the northeast by Egloshayle parish and to the southeast by Lanivet parish. Together with Egloshayle it was one of the two parishes within which the town of Wadebridge developed.

== History ==
=== Prehistory ===
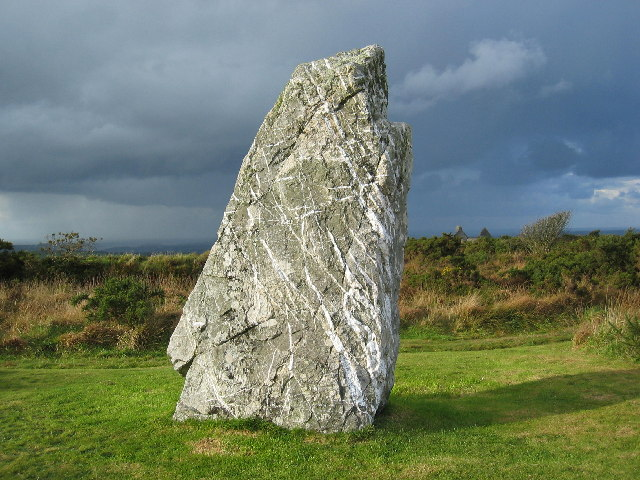
St Breock Downs Monolith

Around two miles south of the village stands the St Breock Downs Monolith, a 16 ft (5 m) high prehistoric standing stone. It is the largest and heaviest prehistoric standing stone in Cornwall. Around one mile northwest of the monolith is a prehistoric dolmen known as Pawton Quoit.

=== 20th century ===
During World War 2 there was a report of both bombs and incendiaries being dropped near St Breock in August 1940.

== Manor of Pawton ==
The Manor of Pawton, already established in Saxon times, was very large, extending to six whole parishes and parts of four others. It was granted to the Bishops of Sherborne by King Egbert of Wessex and held by their successors until it was alienated under Henry VIII. In 1086 there were 44 hides of land, land for 60 ploughs, 40 villagers and 40 smallholders; pasture 12 sq leagues, woodland 2 sq leagues. Charles G. Henderson wrote in 1925 that slight remains of the bishop's palace and deer park were still to be seen. On the down above Pawton is a very large barrow with massive dolmen. At Nanscowe Farm a pillar stone of the 5th or 6th century with inscription meaning 'To the son of Ulcagnus; and to Severus' (in Latin).

== Parish Church ==
The parish church grid reference SW 977 717 is dedicated to St Briocus and dates back to the 13th century although it was extensively rebuilt in 1677. (The aisle, south transept and porches are additions of the 15th and 16th centuries.) The church has a battlemented tower with a ring of five bells. It is situated beside the stream in the valley bottom and in 1965 suffered damage in a major flood. The nave is longer than usual in a parish church: this may be connected to the fact that the Bishops of Exeter owned the manor of Pawton before the Reformation and had a palace there. In 1790 the rector here was John Molesworth and his wife Catherine Molesworth was an amateur artist. The church was restored for £1,400, and reopened on 26 July 1881 by Edward Benson, the Bishop of Truro.

The church contains some fine monuments to members of the Tredeneck family and one of 1598 to William and Jane Viell. The heirs of the Viell family in the 17th century were the Prideaux family of Prideaux Place, which still owned the manor of St Breock in 1968. There is a brass probably also to a Tredeneck, ca. 1520. The church organ was the work of 'Father' Willis. Seth Ward, afterwards a bishop, was briefly the incumbent here.

== Cornish wrestling ==
Cornish wrestling tournaments have been held in St Breock parish for many centuries; there is a recorded tournament in Pawton in 1302.
