= St Eval =

Coordinates: 50.478°N 4.984°W

St Eval: Cornish: S. Uvel
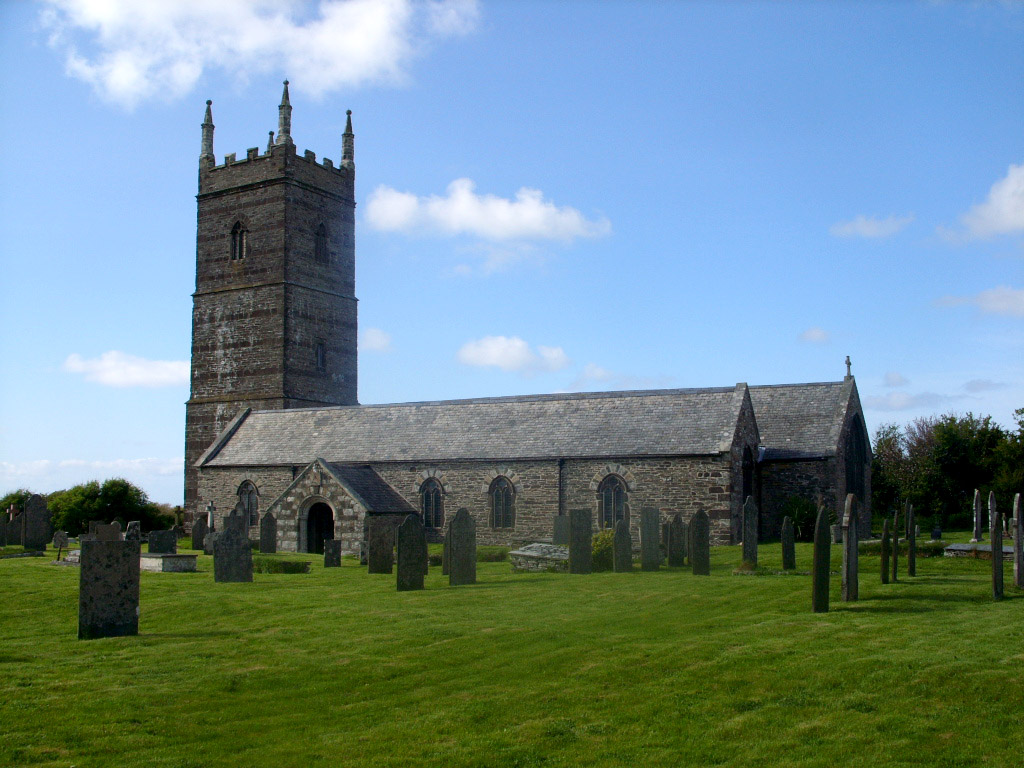
- St Eval church

- Location within Cornwall
- Population: 732 (civil parish 2011)
- OS grid reference: SW883685
- Civil parish: St Eval
- Unitary authority: Cornwall
- Ceremonial county: Cornwall
- Region: South West
- Country: England
- Sovereign state: United Kingdom
- Post town: WADEBRIDGE
- Postcode district: PL27
- Dialling code: 01841
- Police: Devon and Cornwall
- Fire: Cornwall
- Ambulance: South Western
- UK Parliament: North Cornwall

St Eval (Cornish: S. Uvel) is a civil parish and hamlet in north Cornwall, England, United Kingdom. The hamlet is about four miles (6.5 km) southwest of Padstow. The parish population at the 2011 census was 960.

Much of the village land was acquired by compulsory purchase in 1938 to build an RAF Coastal Command Station, RAF St Eval. Many buildings were demolished leaving only the Norman church, the Vicarage, and Trevisker Farm. These buildings were effectively surrounded by RAF activity, and during World War II were taken over for RAF use, with the church tower used as an observation post and navigation mark.

The parish incorporates the southern part of Porthcothan and the hamlets of Engollan and Treburrick.

== Parish church ==
In early times St Eval lay within the episcopal fief and peculiar deanery of Pawton. In 1297 the benefice was appropriated to the Dean and Chapter of Exeter; in 1312 the Dean and Chapter were in dispute with the vicar about the repair of the chancel. This was settled in 1322 by the vicar lengthening the chancel by six feet (1.8 metres) and rebuilding its walls. The aisle and tower were added before 1662 and in 1725 collections were made throughout the diocese for funds to rebuild the tower. The merchants of Bristol acknowledged the usefulness of the church tower as a sea mark and provided the funds for this in 1727. The oldest part of the church is Norman but the north transept has been rebuilt. The south aisle is Perpendicular; the arcade has six arches but only four belong to the nave and the fifth arch is low but the sixth high again. Features of interest are the plain Norman font, the base of the rood screen, the octagonal pulpit dated 1688, and a good set of bench ends, reused in the restoration of 1889. The restoration was the work of J. D. Sedding. The stained glass (1989) commemorates the RAF station. The churchyard contains the war graves of 23 Commonwealth air force personnel of World War II.

St Eval church (dedicated to St Uvelus or Eval, about whom nothing is known) was incorporated into the combined benefice of St Mawgan, St Ervan and St Eval, and subsequently into the Lann Pydar Benefice together with St Columb Major.

In medieval times there were chapels at Efflins (dedicated to St Katherine) and Trethewell.

== Prehistoric settlement at Trevisker round ==
In 1955 and 1956 excavations were carried out on behalf of the Ministry of Works on the site currently occupied by Trevisker School and playground. The Excavation found evidence of a Bronze Age and Iron Age settlement. From the pottery found at Trevisker round at St. Eval it was possible to distinguish several stages of occupation. This was the first Bronze Age site of this kind in the UK. This type of Bronze Age pottery is known as Trevisker Ware.

== Sale of Ministry of Defence housing ==
In 1996, Annington Homes purchased a number of prefabricated homes in St Eval from the Ministry of Defence as part of a £1.67bn national agreement. The homes, which had been constructed as temporary structures soon after the Second World War and lacked insulation, were reconstructed by Annington while preserving the original roofs in order to relieve the company from a responsibility to provide affordable housing.

== Notable parishioners ==
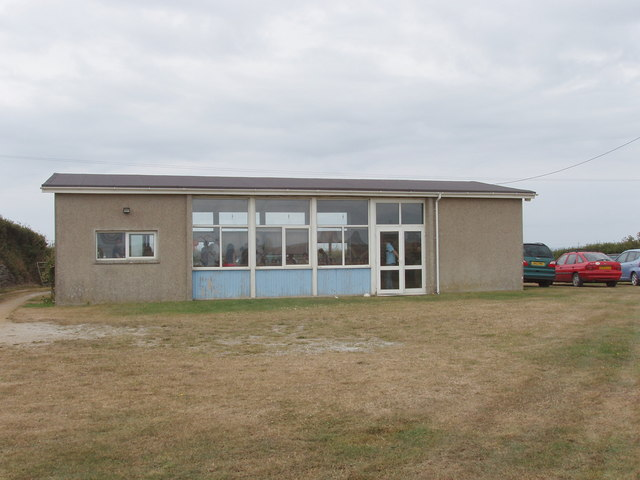
St Eval parish hall

- John Pudney (1909–1977), poet and author, served at RAF St Eval and wrote poems there.
- George Hawke, pioneer emigrant to Australia. whose diary was published as a book called Road to Byng by Yvonne McBurney, (1982) ISBN 0-908053-18-5
- Nick Darke (1948–2005), playwright and journalist, was born and grew up in St Eval

== Shops and businesses ==
St. Eval has a local shop which is home to a Post Office. Kernow Chocolate has its factory nearby. Rick Stein group has an administration office in St. Eval
