= St Issey =

Coordinates: 50.510°N 4.923°W

St Issey: Cornish: Egloskrug
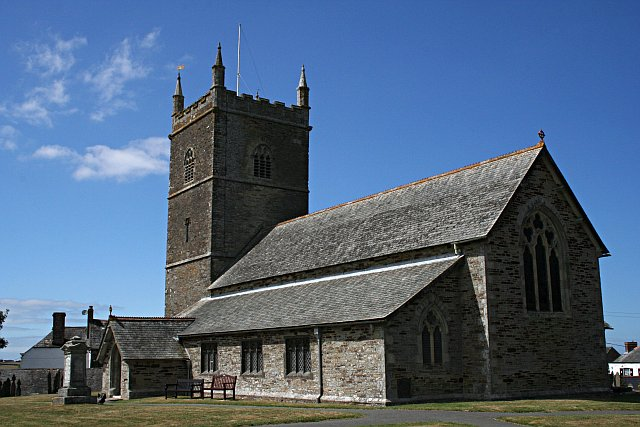
- St Issey church

- Location within Cornwall
- Population: 891 (2011 census including Little Petherick)
- OS grid reference: SW928718
- Civil parish: St Issey
- Unitary authority: Cornwall
- Ceremonial county: Cornwall
- Region: South West
- Country: England
- Sovereign state: United Kingdom
- Post town: WADEBRIDGE
- Postcode district: PL27
- Dialling code: 01841
- Police: Devon and Cornwall
- Fire: Cornwall
- Ambulance: South Western
- UK Parliament: North Cornwall

St Issey (Cornish: Egloskrug) is a civil parish and village in Cornwall, England, United Kingdom. It lies approximately two miles (3 km) south of Padstow. The parish covers an area of approximately 4,500 acres (18 km^{2}). At the 2011 census the parish population was 940. An electoral ward with the name of St Issey also existed before being replaced in 2013 by St Issey and St Tudy, which also included the village and civil parish of St Tudy. The population of the ward at the same census was 4,111.

== History ==
The parish takes its name from Saint Yse (or Ida), one of the twenty-four children of St Brychan, a 4th-century Welsh saint and king. (The name of the hamlet St Jidgey is also derived from the name of the same saint.) The Cornish name means "the church on the tumulus". In early records Egloscruk is the name of the parish, while St Ida refers to the site of the saint's chapel and holy well at Zanzidgie. Until 1199 the parish formed part of the manor and peculiar of Pawton, belonging to the Bishop of Exeter; it was then appropriated by the bishop to the Chapter of Exeter Cathedral. At Sea Mills near Trevorrick are the remains of a sea mill on the River Camel.

On 20 August 1940 several bombs were dropped in the St Issey area, although some failed to explode.

== Parish church ==
The parish church is partly Norman and was enlarged in the 15th century when the south aisle and tower were built. The tower has been rebuilt twice, c. 1680, and again in 1871. In 1869 the church tower was struck by lightning and collapsed. Though there was a "lamentable rebuilding in 1871" (Charles Henderson) there are some features of great interest. These include the reredos and a Pietà of Catacleuse stone which may be fragments of a late medieval monument, possibly that of Lady Matilda Chyverston which is mentioned in a document of 1399. According to local tradition the stonework was originally in the chapel at Halwyn, an estate of the Hamelys. Ruins of the house, chapel and columbarium were mentioned by Henderson in 1925.

== The Ring O' Bells Inn ==
On a corner opposite the church is the Ring O Bells Inn, known locally as 'The Ringers'. Dating from the 17th century, it is one of the oldest inns in the area and retains many of its original features.

== Cornish wrestling ==
Cornish wrestling tournaments, for prizes, were held in St Issey in the 1800s.

== Trelow Downs ==
Trelow Downs, to the south of the civil parish, is designated as a Site of Special Scientific Interest for the dry and wet heaths, valley mires and scrub.

== HMS St Issey ==
On 28 December 1942 the British tug HMS St. Issey (Lt. J. H. W. Howe, RNR) was torpedoed and sunk by German submarine U-617 off Benghazi, Libya.
