= Harlyn =

Village in north Cornwall, England

Coordinates: 50.538°N 4.997°W

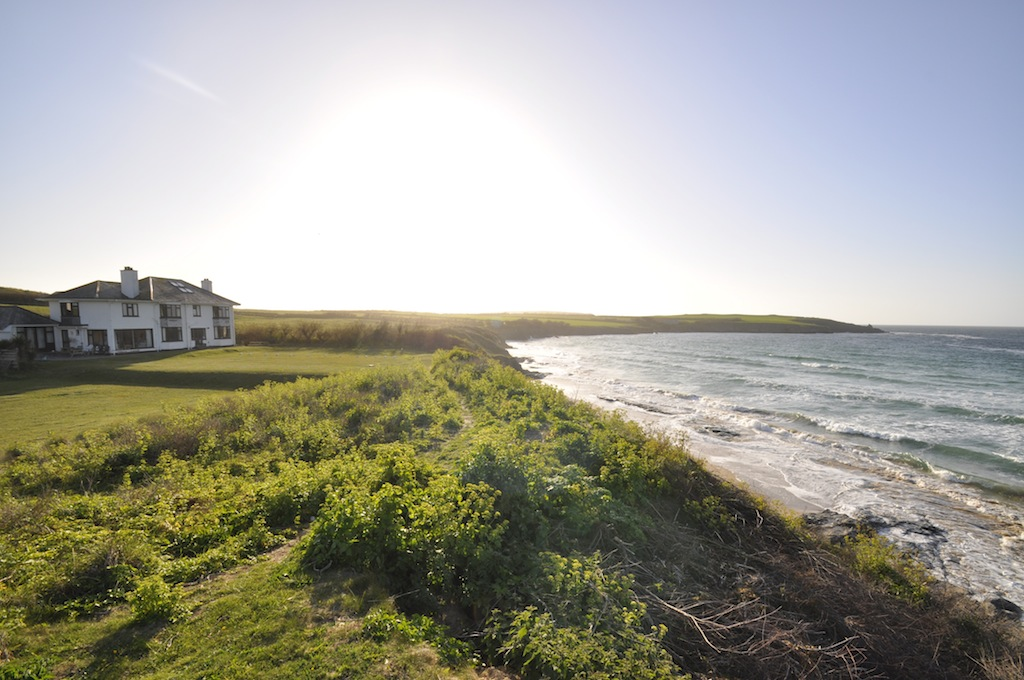
Sunset at high tide looking West from clifftop

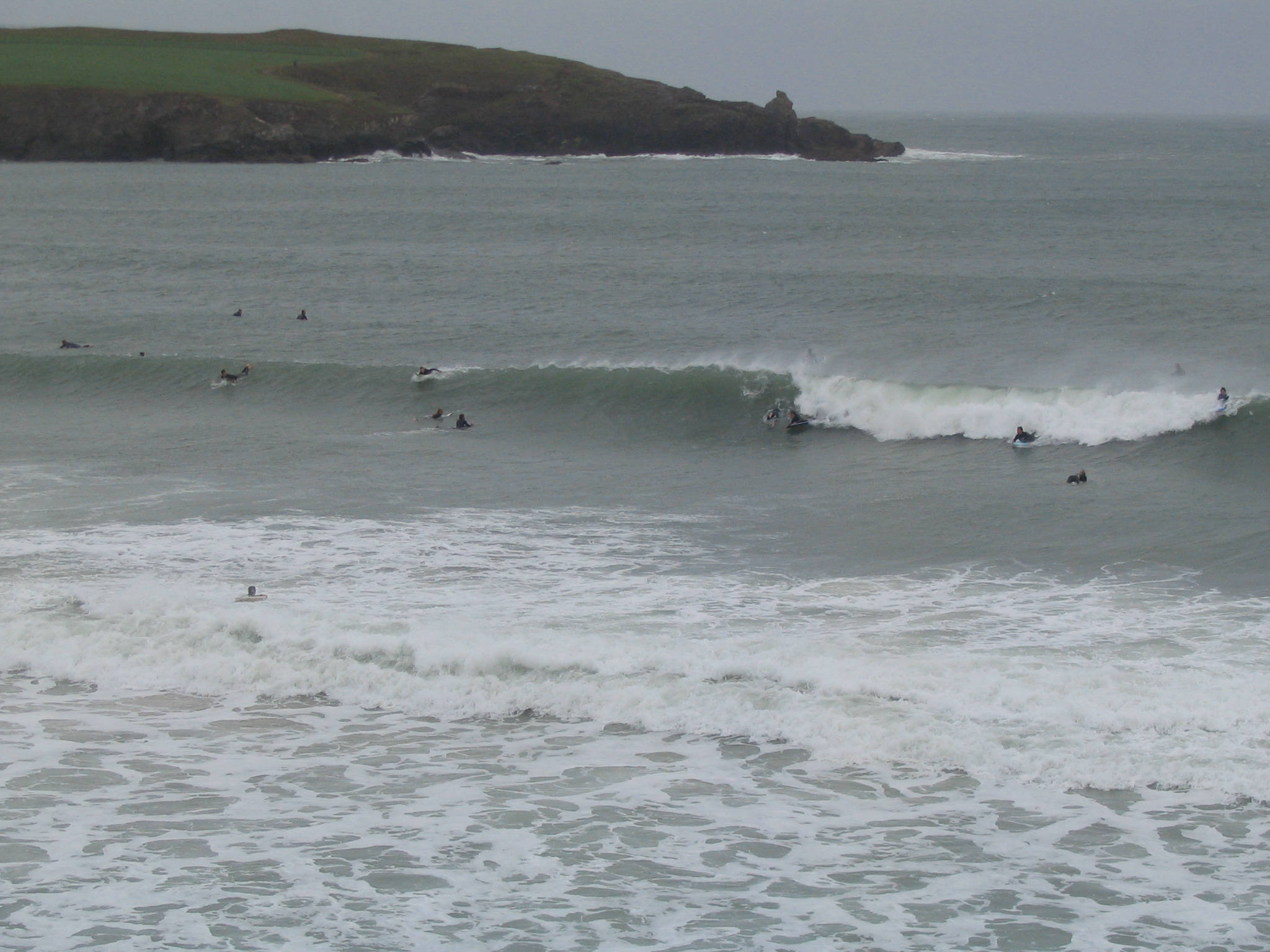
Surfers at Harlyn Bay

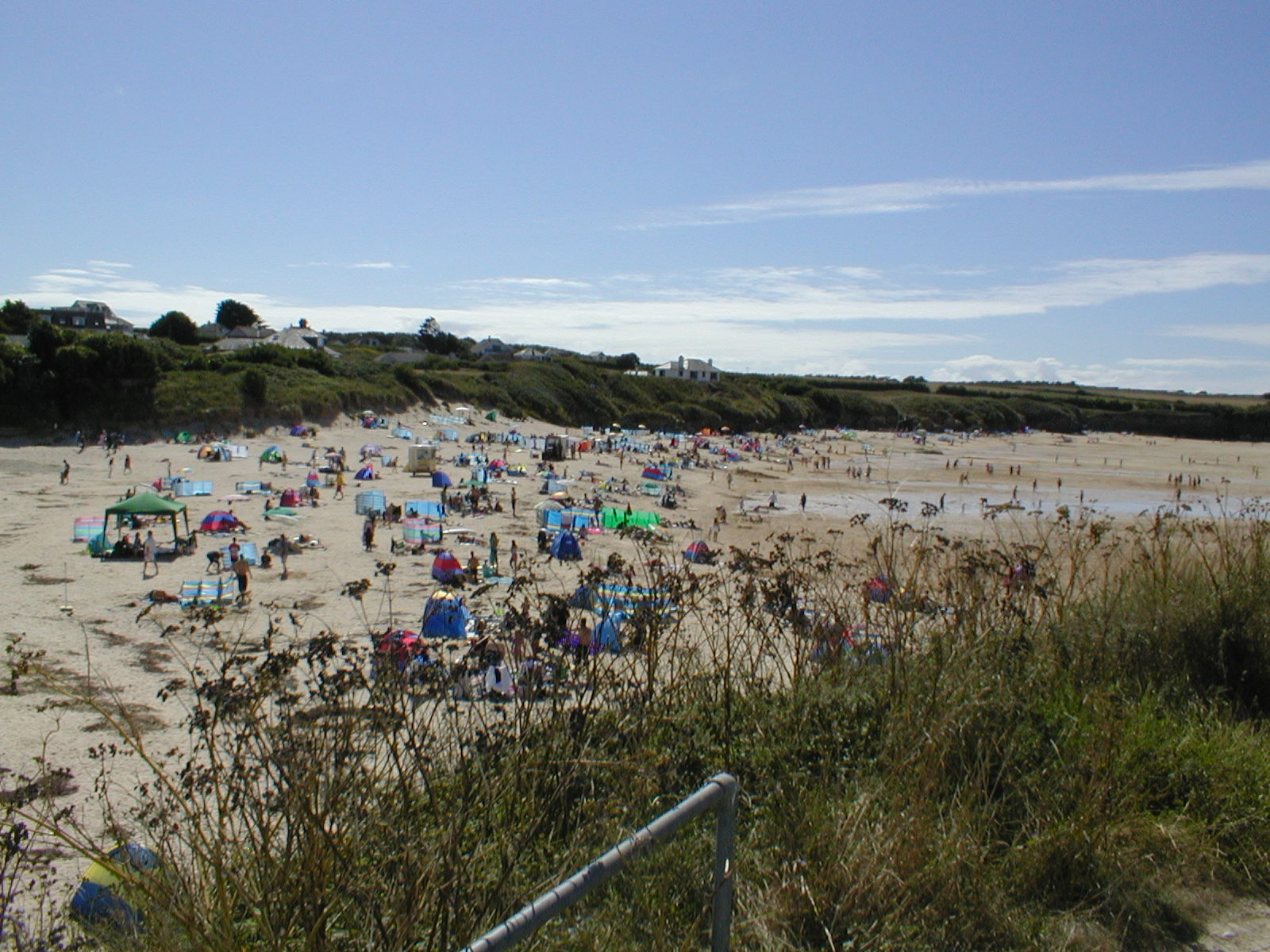
Harlyn beach on a busy summer day

Harlyn (Cornish: Arlynn, meaning facing a pool) is a small village on the north coast of Cornwall, England, United Kingdom. It is situated inland from Harlyn Bay (Cornish: Porth Arlynn) three miles from Padstow and about one mile from St. Merryn.

Harlyn Bay and the surrounding farm has been owned by the Hellyar family since 1800. It originally comprised the Farm, Beach, Farmhouse (now The Pig at Harlyn) and the Fish Cellars. The Beach is a family and surfing beach and is suitable for novice surfers. Many of the houses in Harlyn are holiday lets.

East of Harlyn Bay is the village and beach of Trevone and west of Harlyn are Cataclews Point (Cornish: Karrek Loos, meaning grey rock), Mother Ivey's Bay and Trevose Head. Further west, the beaches at Constantine Bay, Porthcothan and Treyarnon are linked by the South West Coast Path.

Harlyn lies within the Cornwall Area of Outstanding Natural Beauty (AONB). The farm and the many archeological sites are maintained by Harlyn Estates LLP.

The village is comprised to a large extent of second homes, and is quiet for much of the year.

== The Gold Lunulae of Harlyn ==
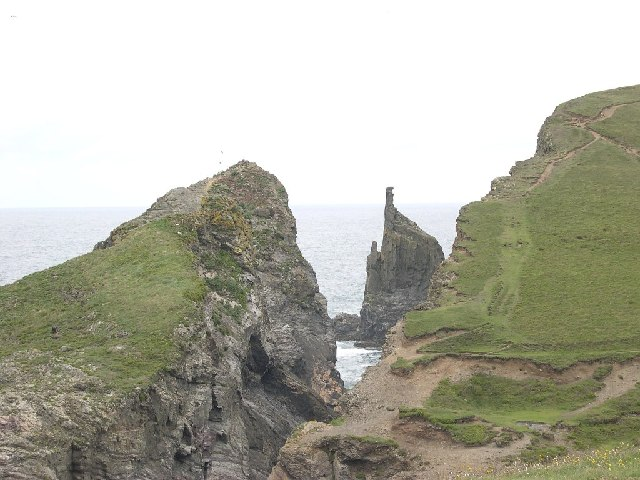
Gunver Head

In 1865 a labourer found two wafer-thin crescents of gold known as lunulae at Harlyn Bay. They probably date from the early Bronze Age, and were probably deposited as grave goods, as there are several prehistoric burial mounds nearby. The shape of these lunulae indicates a symbolic meaning. They represent the crescent horns of the moon, and may thus have been objects of great ritual and ceremonial significance. The site of the finds was above Onjohn Cove, a small cove between Harlyn Bay and Cataclews Point at grid reference SW 872 759. They are preserved at the Royal Cornwall Museum, Truro.

In 2014, after heavy storms had battered the cliffs of Harlyn Bay, local residents and beach users discovered the storms had uncovered an ancient burial cist containing human remains. The remains were recovered for further investigation, but it is assumed that they belong to a female from either the Iron or Bronze Age periods.
