= Margaret Ascham =

Sixteenth century English writer

Margaret Ascham (nee Harleston; c. 1528 – c. 1592), was a sixteenth century English writer. Margaret was the daughter of Sir Clement Harleston. She was married to the humanist writer Roger Ascham, who was tutor to the young Elizabeth I.

Margaret was born in South Ockendon, Essex. She first married a man named Howe, who died about 1552. She then married Roger Ascham in 1554. They had at least three sons, Giles, Dudley and Thomas (or Sturmius by another account), but may have had as many as six children together. One child, a son, was lost in his infancy during the early years of their marriage.

Roger was considerably older than Margaret and of ill health. He died in 1568, leaving behind his unfinished manuscript The Scholemaster. Margaret then took it upon herself to complete the manuscript and prepare it for publishing. She raised the funds and the book was successfully published in 1570.

The Scholemaster is a treatise on the correct way to teach Latin composition, and also concerns the whole learning experience. It was reprinted in 1571 and 1589. It was edited by James Upton in 1711 and in 1743, by John Eyton Bickersteth Mayor in 1863, and by Edward Arber in 1870.

Unusually for the period, Margaret signed her own name in the book's preface, possibly to ensure that her own work in the manuscript would be known. It has been suggested that her intention was to introduce "a broad audience to her editorship." She is credited with preserving her husband's work, which may not otherwise have been published—which, according to George Markham Tweddell, "would have been a great loss to the world had we been deprived of honest Roger's Schoolmaster."

Margaret was remarried in 1569 to her neighbour Thomas Rampston. They had two daughters together. Margaret was careful to ensure that her children were well educated and well placed. Margaret died sometime between 1590 and 1592.
