= Trevone =

Village in Cornwall, England

Coordinates: 50.5418°N 4.9744°W

Trevone: Cornish: Treavon
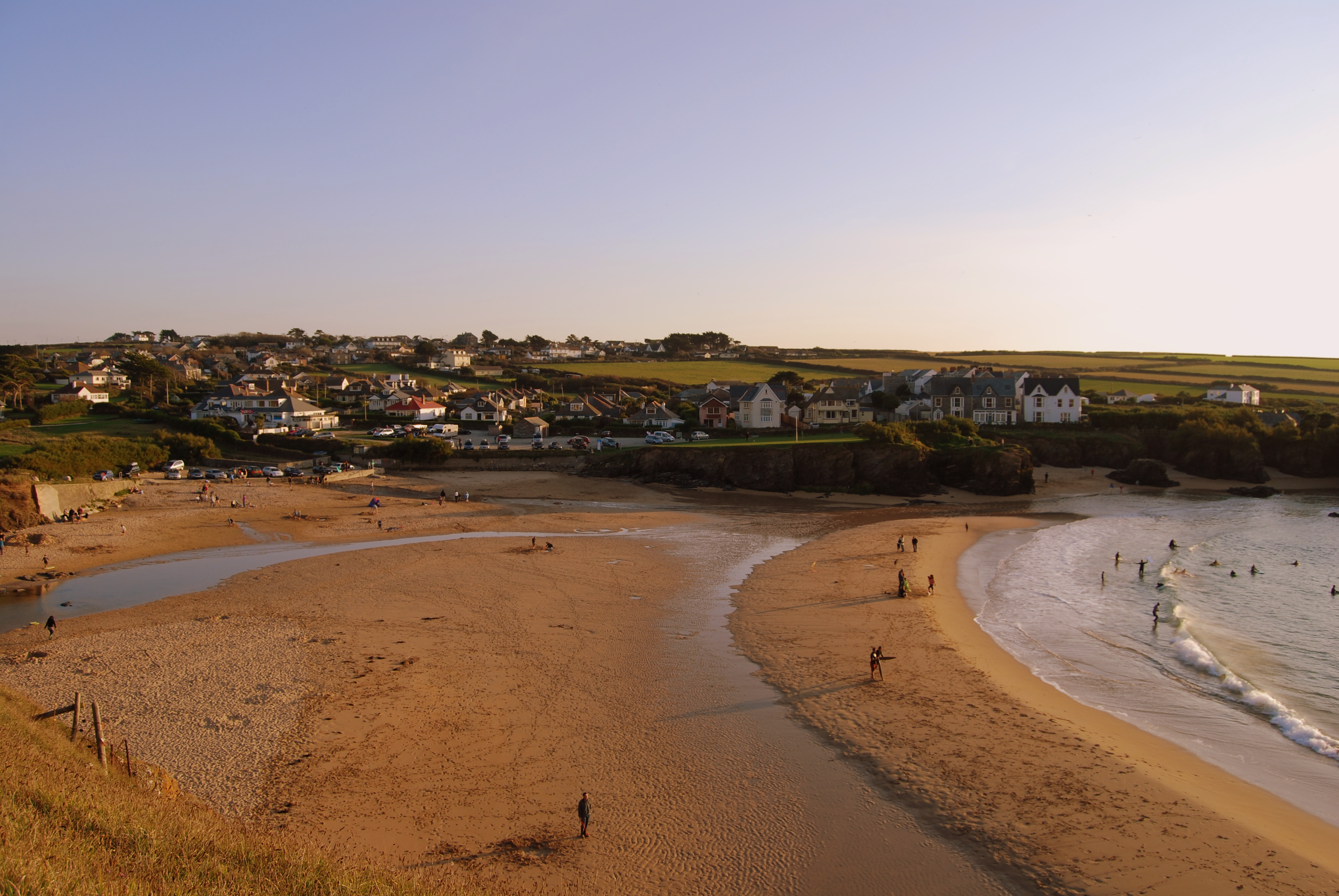
- Trevone beach in the evening

- Location within Cornwall
- OS grid reference: SW893756
- Civil parish: Padstow
- Unitary authority: Cornwall
- Ceremonial county: Cornwall
- Region: South West
- Country: England
- Sovereign state: United Kingdom
- Post town: PADSTOW
- Postcode district: PL28
- Dialling code: 01841
- Police: Devon and Cornwall
- Fire: Cornwall
- Ambulance: South Western
- UK Parliament: North Cornwall

Trevone (Cornish: Treavon, meaning farmstead facing a stone) is a seaside village and bay (Cornish: Baya Porthmusyn) near Padstow in Cornwall, England, UK.

== Geography ==
Trevone Bay is a Site of Special Scientific Interest (SSSI). It contains four Geological Conservation Review sites (GCR) and is within the Cornwall Area of Outstanding Natural Beauty (AONB). There are goniatite fossils on Pentonwarra Point and conodont fossils on Marble Cliff. The 'Round Hole', a large sink hole formed by a collapsed sea cave, can be seen on a sloping field above the east side of the bay. All land in Trevone Bay SSSI is owned by the local authority.

Porthmissen Beach received the highest rating for water quality in 2008 and a good rating in 2002. No dogs are allowed on the beach during the summer months.

== Facilities ==
The village has a village hall, a shop, a Surfing shop and small seasonal cafe. There is also a general store halfway between the top of the hill and the beach. Trevone has recently had its post office closed down, and the general store where the PO operated from is also now closed. However, there is a new store based at Trevone Farm.

Trevone used to have many hotels including Green Waves, Newlands, Trevone Bay Hotel, and The Sea Spray, but the only remaining hotel (and pub) in the bay is the Well Parc. The Newlands Hotel (bed and breakfast) has been renamed Trevone Beach House, and is currently being developed into a private family house. The other hotels are now tourist apartments.

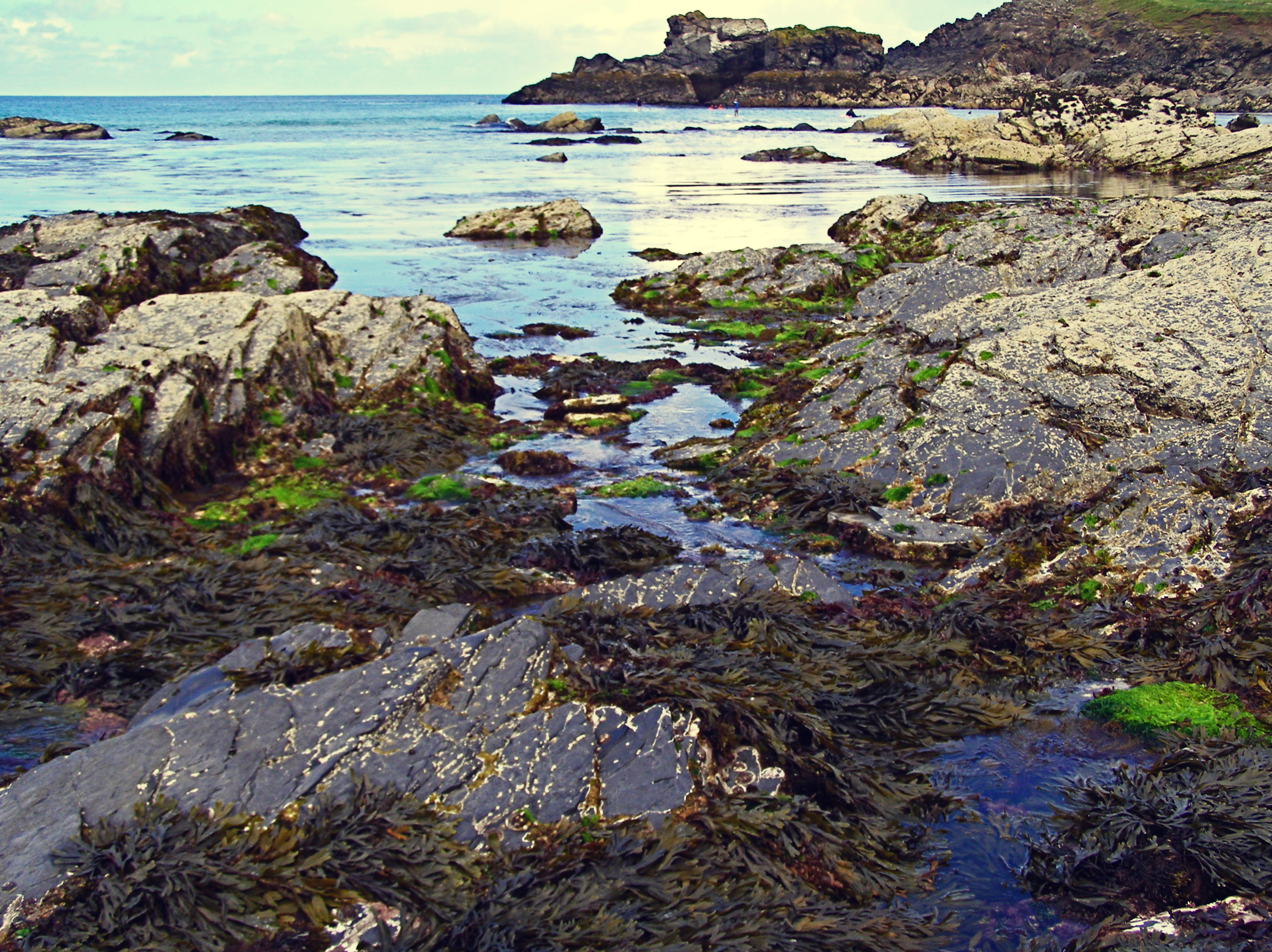
Trevone Bay

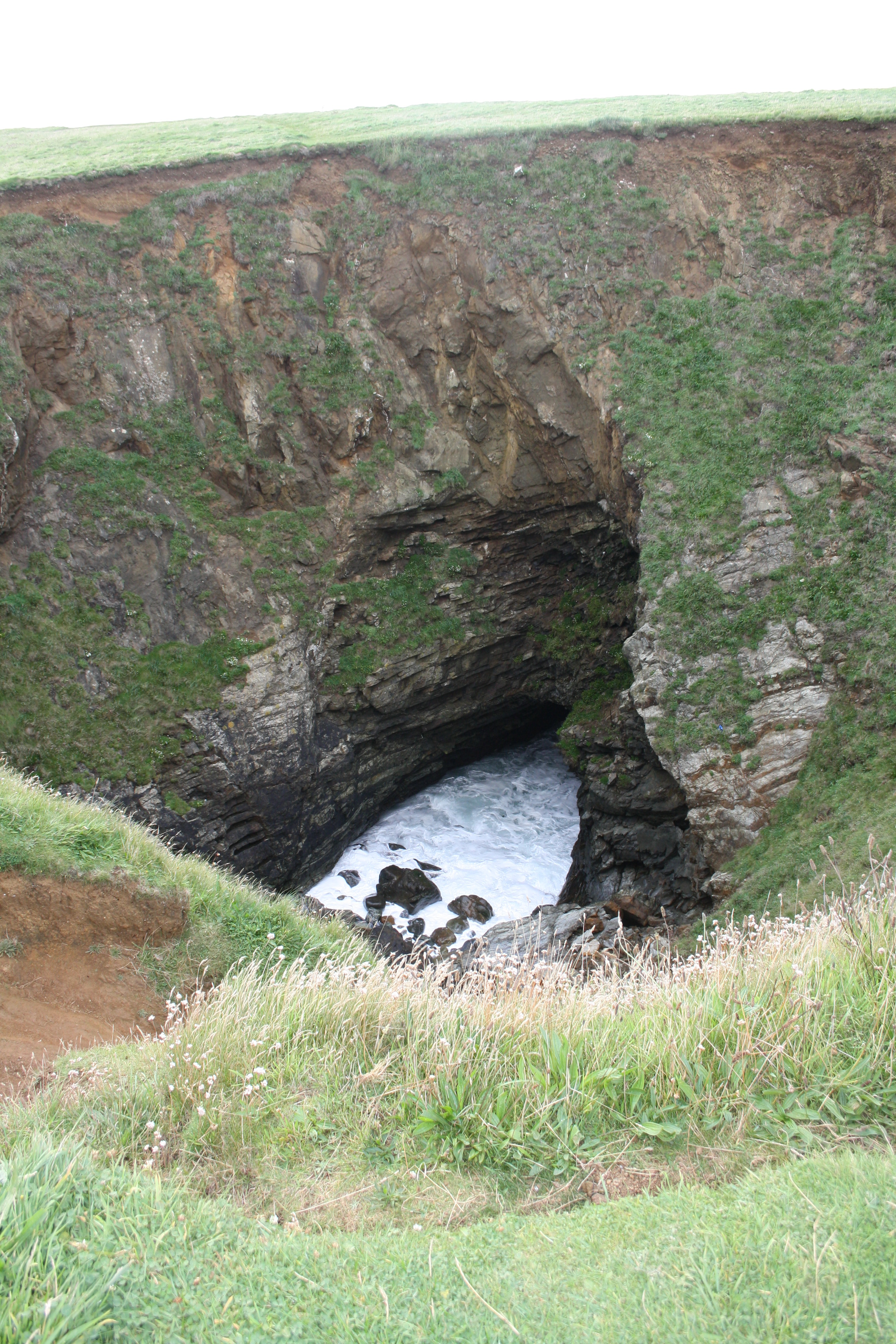
The Blowhole, August 2009

== St Saviour's Church ==
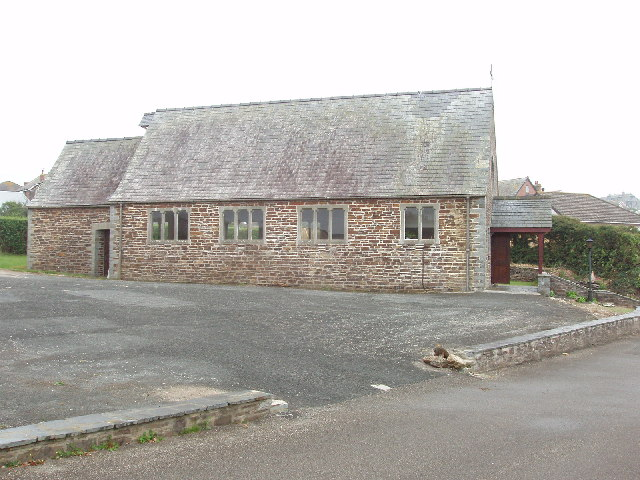
St Saviour's Church

St Saviour's Church was built in 1959 with local sandstone from St Columb Downs, replacing a wooden mission church built in 1894. The stone is iron-rich which works outwards as the stone is weathered to give a hard casing. The roof is of Delabole slate. It is dedicated to St Saviour because there was a St Saviour's Chapel on what is now St Saviour's Point, on the Camel Estuary outside Padstow, inside the Doom Bar.

Elizabeth Maria Molteno, the South African suffragist, poet and civil rights activist, retired to Trevone and is buried at St Saviour's.

== See also ==
- Harlyn
- Constantine Bay
- Treyarnon
- Porthcothan
- St. Merryn
