= John Upton (Spenser editor) =

English clergyman and academic (1707–1760)

John Upton (1707–2 December 1760) was an English clergyman, academic and critic. An important early editor of Edmund Spenser, he is best known for the notes in his 1758 edition of Spenser's great romance epic The Faerie Queene, which was first published in 1590 (books 1-3) and 1596 (books 4-6).

Upton was educated at Oxford University, where he was a college fellow. The notes in his edition of The Faerie Queene attempted to link the poem to events in Spenser's life, and characters in the poem with historical figures.

== Life ==
Born at Taunton, he was the second son of James Upton and his wife Mary Proctor. He was educated by his father and at Merton College, Oxford, where he matriculated in 1724. In 1728 he was elected fellow of Exeter College, graduating B.A. 1730, M.A. 1732. He resigned his fellowship in 1736. In 1732 Lord Powlett gave him the rectory of Seavington with Donnington, Somerset; later Earl Talbot gave him the rectory of Great Rissington, Gloucestershire. On 19 January 1637 he was admitted prebendary of Rochester, and he also held the sinecure rectory of Landrillo, Denbigh.

Upton died unmarried at Taunton on 2 December 1760. Among his pupils at Oxford was Jonathan Toup.

== Works ==
Upton published:

- (ed.) Epictetus, To tou Epiktētou Encheiridion, an edition of Arrian's Epictetus, 1739–41, 1744, incorporated by Johann Schweighäuser in his edition of 1799
- Critical observations on Shakespeare, 1746
- Remarks on three plays of Benjamin Jonson Viz. Volpone, or The Fox : Epicoene, or The Silent Woman : and The Alchemist, 1749
- (ed.) Spenser's Faerie Queene, 1758
