= Nick Darke =

British playwright (1948–2005)

- Born: Nicholas Temperley Watson Darke; August 29, 1948; Wadebridge, Cornwall, England
- Died: June 10, 2005 (aged 56)
- Education: Rose Bruford College
- Occupation: Playwright
- Years active: 1978–2005
- Spouse: Jane Darke (m. 1993–2005)
- Children: Henry Darke; Jim Roberts (stepson)
- Parent(s): Pop Darke; Betty Cowan
- Website: www.nickdarke.net

Nick Darke (1948–2005) was a British playwright. He was also known within Cornwall as a lobster fisherman, environmental campaigner, and chairman of St Eval Parish Council.

== Early life ==
Nick's great-grandfather, William Leonard Darke, was a sea captain and master mariner. Nick's grandfather, Temperley Darke, was also a master-mariner and sea-captain who spent his life at sea, and was wrecked twice off the Cape of Good Hope. His father, Temperley Oswald ('Pop') Darke, was a North Cornwall chicken farmer, and a distinguished ornithologist. His mother, Betty Cowan, was an actress who performed throughout the UK. Betty's father was the organist at Hampstead Church and played organ for Elgar. After acting, Betty ran a cafe called 'Betty's tearooms' from the home where Nick was born in. As a small boy, Darke remembered uninvited holidaymakers snooping around parts of his house, even his bedroom, and his contempt for the ravaging effects of unchecked, unregulated tourism, began.

Nicholas Temperley Watson Darke was born in Wadebridge, Cornwall. He was raised in, and later moved back to, Porthcothan, where his family had lived for four generations after moving there from Padstow. He was educated at St Merryn Primary School and Truro Cathedral School, from which he was expelled for getting drunk on sports day. He then attended Newquay Grammar School. Darke's aversion to empire and the English ruling class began at boarding school during the sixties, where he experienced sadistic institutionalized bullying and extremely poor sanitary conditions.

He was accepted into the Royal Academy of Dramatic Art but could not afford the fees; he instead trained as an actor at Rose Bruford College, Kent.

== Early career ==
After making his professional début at the Lyric, Belfast, he went on to learn his craft in repertory theatre at the Victoria Theatre, Stoke-on-Trent, England. Over a ten-year period, he acted in over eighty plays at Stoke and between 1977–79 also directed Man Is Man, The Miser, Absurd Person Singular, The Scarlet Pimpernel, and A Cuckoo in the Nest.

His love of theatre in the round began at Stoke: "fluidity of action, jump-cuts from location to location, short scenes, diversity of characters, music as narrative were the bread and butter of the Vic and I've fed on them ever since". He believed the best advice to learn how to be a playwright was to 'go and be an actor'.

At Stoke he wrote his first full-length play, Never Say Rabbit in a Boat, which won the George Devine award in 1979. He then gave up acting to write full-time.

== Playwriting ==
Over the next twenty-seven years, Darke wrote twenty-seven plays which have been performed throughout the world. His plays have been performed at a number of London's theatres including the Royal Court Theatre, Donmar Warehouse, Almeida Theatre, Bush Theatre, and Lyric Theatre. Darke also wrote two plays for the Royal National Theatre, and eight for the Royal Shakespeare Company.

Three of his plays, The Catch, Kissing The Pope, and The Dead Monkey, were originally directed by Roger Michell.

Prominent actors have performed his work, including Tim Roth, Ralph Fiennes, Pete Postlethwaite, Frances Barber, Lesley Sharp, Geoffrey Hutchings, Phillip Jackson, and Antony O'Donnel.

'By turns dreamily inconsequential, passionately satirical, and sharply observant, he is one of the most interesting of our playwrights,' Sunday Telegraph.

Having grown up in a secluded agricultural community similar to Laurie Lee, Darke was a natural fit to adapt Cider With Rosie for the stage, in 1981.

During his career, Darke also wrote twelve radio plays and presented five radio documentaries for Radio Four.

When he returned to Cornwall during the latter part of his career, Kneehigh Theatre performed his work. Kneehigh's London debut, The King Of Prussia, was written by Darke, commissioned by the Donmar Warehouse in 1996. He also wrote Kneehigh's second London show, The Riot, which was commissioned by the National Theatre, Cottesloe, in 1999.

== Screenwriting ==
Darke wrote a Play for Today entitled Farmer's Arms (1983), a comedy western set in the parish of St Merryn, near where he grew up, starring Phillip Jackson, Colin Welland, and Brenda Bruce.

In 1999, Darke wrote a TV movie called The Bench, starring Geoffrey Hutchings and Leslie Grantham. He also worked with Hutchings twice in the theatre, with one-man, one-act monologue Bud at the Almeida in 1985, and later Hutchings had the central role in The Riot at the National Theatre in 1999.

A film version of Darke's first play Never Say Rabbit in a Boat was in pre-production with APT Films when he died in 2005.

His son Henry Darke made short film versions of his plays Danger My Ally in 2003, and Highwater in 2006.

== Documentary ==
The Wrecking Season (2004) was Darke's final work and his first documentary. He wrote, presented, and narrated the film, which his widow Jane Darke filmed and directed. The Wrecking Season charts the lives of Cornish 'wreckers', traditionally Cornish farm-hands who collected bulk wood that washed in after a storm to sell for additional money and supplement their income when farming was slack, or to use to build with. More broadly the film explores the journey of long haul drift and general sea debris, notably sea beans from the Amazon basin and tuna and lobster fisherman's tags from the Maine and Massachusetts fisheries, and how 'wreck' follows a consistent route around the Gulf Stream, arriving specifically on the west coast of Ireland and the North Cornwall coast. Darke talks to oceanographers, wood specialists, and fisherman on both sides of the Atlantic.

Darke himself was a 'wrecker' after moving permanently back home to Porthcothan in 1990. He self-built part of his home with wreck wood salvaged after storms from beaches across Cornwall, and traded fishing gear that he found with Padstow lobster fishermen for bait and lobster pots that he then used to fish with. During their wrecking, Nick and Jane Darke personally amassed one of the largest collections of tropical sea-beans in Europe.

The documentary was innovative at the time for its investigation into the variety of plastics on Cornish beaches, including microplastics such as 'nurdles'.

The Wrecking Season was broadcast on BBC4 shortly after Nick's death.

== Environmental activism ==
Darke claimed his greatest achievement (and that of his wife Jane) was campaigning North Cornwall District Council to end the mechanical raking of beaches on the North Cornwall coast. A system of cleaning that did great harm to the natural eco-system of beaches in Cornwall. This followed in the footsteps of his father, conservationist 'Pop' Darke, who as St Eval Parish Council chairman before Nick, prevented a car park from being built on the site of Porthcothan sand-dunes.

== Personal life ==
Nick Darke met painter and documentary filmmaker Jane Darke (née Spurway) in Sevenoaks, Kent, in 1979. They began a relationship in 1980 and married in 1993.

Nick is the father of film-maker Henry Darke and stepfather of Jim Roberts, a marine scientist who works for the NIWA environmental research institute of New Zealand.

Nick was made a bard of the Cornish Gorsedd in 1996, taking the Bardic name Scryfer Gwaryow ('Writer of Plays').

== Death ==
Darke suffered a stroke in January 2001, leaving him unable to write and speak. The process of recovery was documented in the radio documentary Dumbstruck. Having relearnt the ability to write and speak with the help of his wife, and nearly fully recovered from the stroke, Darke was diagnosed with terminal cancer. He died one month after his diagnosis, aged 56, in June 2005.

A beach funeral ceremony was followed by burial in St Eval churchyard. The Art of Catching Lobsters, directed and filmed by Jane Darke, with additional camera-work by Molly Dineen, is an account of her husband's death, and the grieving process.

== Influences ==
Peter Cheeseman, the artistic director of Victoria Theatre Stoke, was a huge influence on the early part of Darke's career and the direction it would take. Cheeseman oversaw Darke's move from actor to director and eventually to writer of the annual winter pantomime two years in a row. Cheeseman saw enough promise in Darke's adaptation of Mother Goose to commission his first play.

As well as Chekhov and Ibsen, a big influence on Darke's work was Bertolt Brecht, and specifically Mann ist Mann. Darke was personally and creatively fascinated by the individual's ability to entirely remake themselves anew, exploring the subject in three of his plays: The Body, The Bogus, and Kissing The Pope.

Later on, Edward Abbey's The Monkey Wrench Gang, and Dessert Solitaire, were big influences on Darke's attitude to the natural world and our collective responsibility towards it.

He was also friends with, and hugely influenced by, Cornwall's leading historian John Angarrack, whom Darke made a short documentary film about, named after Angarrack's first book Breaking The Chains (2000).

The biggest influences on Darke's life and work were the farmers he grew up with as a boy, the fishermen he made friends with as a man, and the distinctly Cornish men and women in the parish of St Eval who once defined the area but who he watched gradually and completely disappear from the community.

== Style and legacy ==
Subjects ranged from eco-sabotage, Greek mythology, child soldiers, U.S. geopolitics, Saint Paul, the right-wing lobbying arm of the evangelical Christian movement, domestic abuse, British colonialism, and slavery in Africa, but the bulk of Nick's work, reflected Cornish society and culture, such as tin mining, farming, and fishing. He had a preoccupation with depicting authentic Cornish characters, based on the people he lived and grew up with.

Nick Darke's literary voice is highly distinctive and many of his characters, plots and settings are rooted in real Cornish life, past and present. As one of his earliest reviews, in The Financial Times stated: "Darke gives shape to a Cornish identity that feels vital and real and has nothing to do with clay pipes and clotted cream".

In 2009, director Simon Harvey and the Cornwall Youth Theatre Company began Darke Visions, an eighteen-month festival running from Spring 2009 to Summer 2010 celebrating Darke's life and work, with the performance of Hells' Mouth (directed by Harry and Theresa Forbes-Pearce); The Body (directed by Tom Faulkner); and Ting Tang Mine (directed by Rory Wilton and Emma Spurgin Hussey). These plays went on tour in Cornwall during March/April 2009.

In 2011 the theatre group o-region toured small-scale venues with a new show One Darke Night which also celebrated Nick Darke's legacy. Combining specially commissioned film (featuring Nick's son, Henry) and a small cast of players, the play fused extracts from lesser-known works with plays such as The King of Prussia and extracts from Darke's other writings. Compiled by Simon Harvey, who had worked with Nick on the production of his final play Laughing Gas in 2006, the production provided fresh insight into the remarkable range and diversity of Nick's catalogue of work.

Among others, Nick mentored playwright Carl Grose and film director Mark Jenkin, both of whom won Falmouth University's Nick Darke Award, and both of whom cite Nick as a source of inspiration for their own work.

=== The Nick Darke Award ===
The Nick Darke Award was developed by Nick Darke's widow, with the support of Nick Darke's family and Falmouth University. Funded by the university, the annual award began as a financial prize aimed at giving writers time to write an entirely new work for stage, screen or radio. The award then developed from a Cornwall-focused prize, based on short treatment submissions, into one purely for fully-written, and polished new plays, similar in structure to other prominent national playwriting prizes. Submissions for the award immediately jumped from one hundred, to one-thousand five hundred, and in broadening its scope, became another welcome new home for newly written, unperformed plays, and exciting new voices in the theatre world.

== Published works ==
- The Body (RSC playtext: Methuen Publishing, pbk 1983); ISBN 0-413-53340-9
- Ting Tang Mine & Other Plays (New Theatrescripts: Methuen Publishing, pbk 1987); ISBN 0-413-17930-3
- Kissing The Pope – play text and Nicaraguan travel diary (Nick Hern Books, pbk 1990); ISBN 1-85459-047-2
- Cider with Rosie (Heinemann Plays: new edition, hrdbk, 1993); ISBN 0-435-23295-9
- The Riot (Methuen Modern Plays: Methuen Drama, pbk 1999); ISBN 0-413-73730-6
- Nick Darke Plays (Methuen Contemporary Dramatists: Vol 1, pbk 1999) – incls "The Dead Monkey", "The King of Prussia", "The Body" and "Ting Tang Mine"; ISBN 0-413-73720-9

=== Plays ===
- Mother Goose (1977; Victoria Theatre, Stoke-on-Trent) – pantomime
- Never Say Rabbit in a Boat (1977; Victoria Theatre, Stoke-on-Trent) – his first full-length play, set in Cornwall about an ageing rabbit catcher and a beach seine net company. Hellyar Jan is also a fisherman, smuggler and born liar. The action takes place on the beach of a small bay in North Cornwall and in Hellyar's old house on the cliff above.
- Low tide (1977; Plymouth Theatre Company) – about tourism set on a beach.
- Sinbad the Sailor (1978; Victoria Theatre, Stoke-on-Trent) – pantomime
- Summer Trade (1979; Orchard Theatre) – takes place in a pub somewhere on the North Cornish coast the day after the ex-landlord's last night. The new landlord has plans to modernise.
- Beauty and the Beast (1979; Orchard Theatre) – pantomime
- Landmarks (1979; Chester Gateway Theatre) – set in the thirties in rural England when horse met the tractor for the first and last time.
- A Tickle on the River's Back (1979; Theatre Royal Stratford East) – set on the Thames about a family of lightermen and the decline of the industry on the river over the last 20 years.
- High Water (1980; Royal Shakespeare Company) – set on a beach early one morning. Two men meet to go wrecking and discover they are father and son.
- Say Your Prayers (1981; Joint Stock Theatre Company) – set in the time of the Roman Empire, and based on an interpretation of the teachings of St Paul. The play takes a wry look at Christianity as the 'Born Again' movement develops into a powerful right-wing lobby in the USA, while the established church in Britain is at its lowest ebb yet.
- The Catch (1981; for The Royal Court Theatre Upstairs) – two fishermen bedevilled by the European Economic Community cast their nets for a different kind of catch – cocaine.
- Cider with Rosie (1981) – growing up in the idyllic English countryside between the two world wars (based on the autobiography of Laurie Lee of the same name)
- The Lowestoff Man (1982; Orchard Theatre Company) – sequel to "The Catch", a mysterious American arrives to claim his cocaine
- The Body (1983; Royal Shakespeare Company) – an eccentric West Country community contend with the presence of an American air base. It was written during the Cold War with the USSR when many were concerned about American nuclear weapons on British soil. Nick had a friend whose farm backed onto the St Mawgan Air Base. Every morning the farmer went to check his sheep while a US Marine followed his movements with a gun. Darke's researched how marines were trained, broken down and rebuilt so they would be effective fighting men and said that The Body was a play about identity.
- The Earth Turned Inside Out (1984; community play for the Borough of Restormel, Cornwall) – the rivalries of two Cornish mining communities set in 1815 at a time when the Cornish copper mining industry was healthy but prone to market forces.
- Bud (1985; Royal Shakespeare Company) – fifty-year-old Bud has spent twenty years without rancour or spite working his wife's farm but his peaceful existence comes to an abrupt halt when a misjudgement forces him to question his motivation and examine the 'acid drop scorchin holes in the startched napkin of our marriage'.
- The Oven Glove Murders (1986, The Bush Theatre, London) – the play is a writer's experience of the film industry. A playwright has a screenplay set in The Greenham Common peace camp given the Hollywood treatment by a young producer; a similar premise is the basis of the film The Strike by The Comic Strip team two years later.
- The Dead Monkey (1986; Royal Shakespeare Company at the Barbican Pit) – a childless Californian couple sit down to a candlelit supper to commemorate the death of their fifteen-year-old pet. The party sours after a series of discomforting revelations. Nick Darke's best known play, The Dead Monkey has been staged many times around the world, including a major USA revival featuring David Soul and in Germany in translation as Der tote Affe.
- Ting Tang Mine (1987; for The National Theatre) – reworking starring Robyn McCaffrey of the community play The Earth Turned Inside Out: the fate of two competing mining communities used as a parable for capitalism.
- A Place Called Mars (1988; community play for Thornbury, South Gloucestershire). The play is set on a haunted marshland.
- Kissing The Pope (1989; Royal Shakespeare Company) – originally known as Campesinos, this is Nick Darke's play for Nicaragua. Set in revolutionary South America, its main themes are about becoming a man in a violent world and about having to decide why to kill before you know why to live. As part of his research, Darke travelled to Nicaragua during the war and wrote a diary of his experiences that was published with the play text by Nick Hearn Books – see Published Works.
- Fears and Miseries of the Third Term – part contributor (1989, Young Vic Studio).
- Hell's Mouth (1992; Royal Shakespeare Company) – story after Sophocles, set in post-apocalyptic dystopia with Cornish nationalists fighting for independence from England.
- Danger My Ally (1993; Kneehigh Theatre) – is about what happens to two eco-warriors when they are caught trying to blow up an open-cast mine. (The title is taken from the autobiography of F. A. Mitchell-Hedges, the English adventurer and traveller.)
- The Bogus (also known as Koyt) (1994; Kneehigh Theatre) – billed as a pan-Atlantic tragi-comedy of murder, corruption and nuptials. When an assassin's bullet lands Arthur May, president-elect of the USA, six feet under, John Sty dons his persona and leaves Springville, Utah, on a one-way ticket to the village of Koyt in Cornwall.
- Knock Out The Pin (1994; Cornwall Youth Theatre Company) – about Newquay lifeboat.
- The King of Prussia (1996; for The National Theatre/Kneehigh) – based on the life and times of 18th century Cornish smuggler, John Carter of Prussia Cove, West Cornwall. Darke saw this as a play about a person's responsibility to their community – the opposite of what he felt was happening in Cornwall and the rest of Britain in the 1990s. He felt the individualistic, free market philosophy, espoused in the 1980s, had destroyed industry everywhere and left communities rootless.
- The Man with Green Hair (1997; Bristol Old Vic) – drew its inspiration from the Camelford water pollution incident of 1988. A water company somewhere in Cornwall has had a slight mix-up with its chemicals and poisoned the water supply. The mustard-keen pollution control officers want to expose the dirty dealings, the water company and the government want to cover it up. The local community side with the water company, for fear of destroying the lucrative tourist trade.
- The Riot (2000; for Kneehigh production at the National Theatre) – set in the fishing village of Newlyn in 1896, about the so-called "Sabbath riots", when the devout Cornish fisherman whose Methodist beliefs forbade them to fish on Sundays demonstrated violently against the Sunday fishing fleet from Lowestoft.
- Laughing Gas (2005; o-region) a comedy about the life of Sir Humphry Davy unfinished at the time of Nick Darke's death; completed posthumously by Cornish actor and playwright Carl Grose and produced by the Truro-based production company o-region.
- One Darke Night (2011; o-region) – a compendium of extracts from Nick Darke's plays spanning nearly thirty years of his writing career, together with film commentary and extracts from his other writings; intended for simple staging with a small number of performers, emphasis on the words.

=== Television and films ===
- Dancers (a dance therapy programme, TV, 1982)
- Farmers Arms (BBC1 'Play for Today', 1983)
- The Bench (TV, 1999)
- Breaking the Chains (film, 2000) Writer: John Angarrack, Director/producer: Nick Darke. Cornish historian John Angarrack talks to Nick Darke about Cornish cultural suppression and the way forward.
- The Cornish Farmer (film, 2004) Writer: Nick Darke, Directors: Nick Darke/Mark Jenkin, Producer: Jane Darke. Nick Darke talks to his old friend, Warwick Cowling, about threshing and other farm practices. The film uses 8 mm archive film shot by Nick's father in the 1960s in St Eval.
- The Wrecking Season (film, 2004; commissioned by the Arts Council and directed by his wife, Jane Darke, first broadcast on BBC4 22 July 2005) a film about beachcombing on the Cornish coast – available on DVD from Boatshed Films.
- The Art of Catching Lobsters (film, 2005; first broadcast on BBC4 27 September 2007), Nick and Jane's second film was initially conceived as a film about Nick's recovery from a stroke through such activities as beachcombing and lobster fishing. Nick was then diagnosed with terminal cancer and the film became a record of his attempts to pass on his knowledge and experience of lobster fishing and the ways of the sea to his son Henry, as well as a poignant documentary about love, loss and the grieving process—also available on DVD from Boatshed Films.
- Nick Darke also appeared in the Exmouth to Bristol episode of the TV series "Coast"

=== Radio ===
- Foggy Anniversary (1979)
- Summer Trade (1980)
- Landmarks (1981)
- Lifeboat (1981)
- The Catch (1983)
- So Long as Lobsters Swim the Sea (1997; Another Strand feature) – described as "An occasional series where those well-known in one field talk about another consuming interest in their lives. Nick Darke, author of many plays for radio, the National Theatre, and the Royal Shakespeare Company, is also a keen fisherman. He talks about his lobster pots and nets off Padstow."
- Cider with Rosie (radio adaptation of Laurie Lee's autobiography) (1998), in two episodes broadcast by BBC as "The Classic Serial".
- Gone Fishing (1998)
- Bawcock's Eve (1999) – a mystery story set in Mousehole, Cornwall.
- Flotsam & Jetsam (1999) – a family tale based in Porthnant Bay, Cornwall.
- The King of Prussia (1999) – set off the Cornish coast in 1789. A mad king, heavy taxes, and smugglers...and in the other direction, a country on the brink of revolution. Based on his play of the same name.
- Underground (feature on Cornish tin mining) (2000) – voices of miners and their families are woven into a text by Nick Darke and music by Jim Carey.
- In quest of Joseph Emidy (2000) – the amazing story of Joseph Antonio Emidy an African slave who eventually became a violinist in the Lisbon Orchestra, fought in the Napoleonic Wars, then settled in Falmouth and became a successful teacher and composer. Produced by Juliam May, with contributions from Richard McGrady (musical historian), Tunde Jegede (composer), Nancy Naro (slavery expert) and Emidy's descendants.
- The Fisherman's Tale (2000) – a group of travellers take shelter in a motorway service station from appalling weather. There is no radio or TV, so to keep each other entertained they each tell a story. Darke's contribution to the "2000 tales" series ", written on the 600th anniversary of Chaucer's death. The (verse) text was first performed as a play as part of the Darke Night Out production – see Plays above. Aunt Feen, part-time caretaker of a house on Bobby's Bay, St Merryn, decides to supplement her income by letting the property to a young man, Jim, without the knowledge of the house's absentee owner Hugo Bryson Spelles – see the official Nick Darke website for the full text https://nickdarke.net/archives.
- Atlantic Drifting (BBC Radio 4 documentary produced by Simon Elmes, 30 November 2001 – the forerunner of The Wrecking season film)
- Dumbstruck (2003; first broadcast on BBC R4) – documentary using an audio diary Nick kept during his rehabilitation after a stroke.
- Hooked (2005; first broadcast 18 July 2005 BBC R4) – a comedy drama-documentary telling the story of a Cornish couple who are asked for their advice by a Londoner on how to fish for Bass, who subsequently cashes in on his new knowledge. Recorded on Porthcothan Beach.

Darke also appeared on the Radio 4 programme "Nature" (broadcast 16 February 2004). BBC Radio commemorated the 10th anniversary of his death by rebroadcasting several of Darke's radio plays in June 2015.

=== Other projects ===
- The Lobster (1998) for speaker and chamber group ('Thoughts of a crustacean upon entering a trap', text by Nick Darke). Performed at the Queen Elizabeth Hall in 1998 by Nicole Tibbels (speaker) with the Mephisto Ensemble conducted by the composer, Christopher Gunning (born 1944). Recorded by them on the Meridian label (CDE 84498).
