= Polventon House =

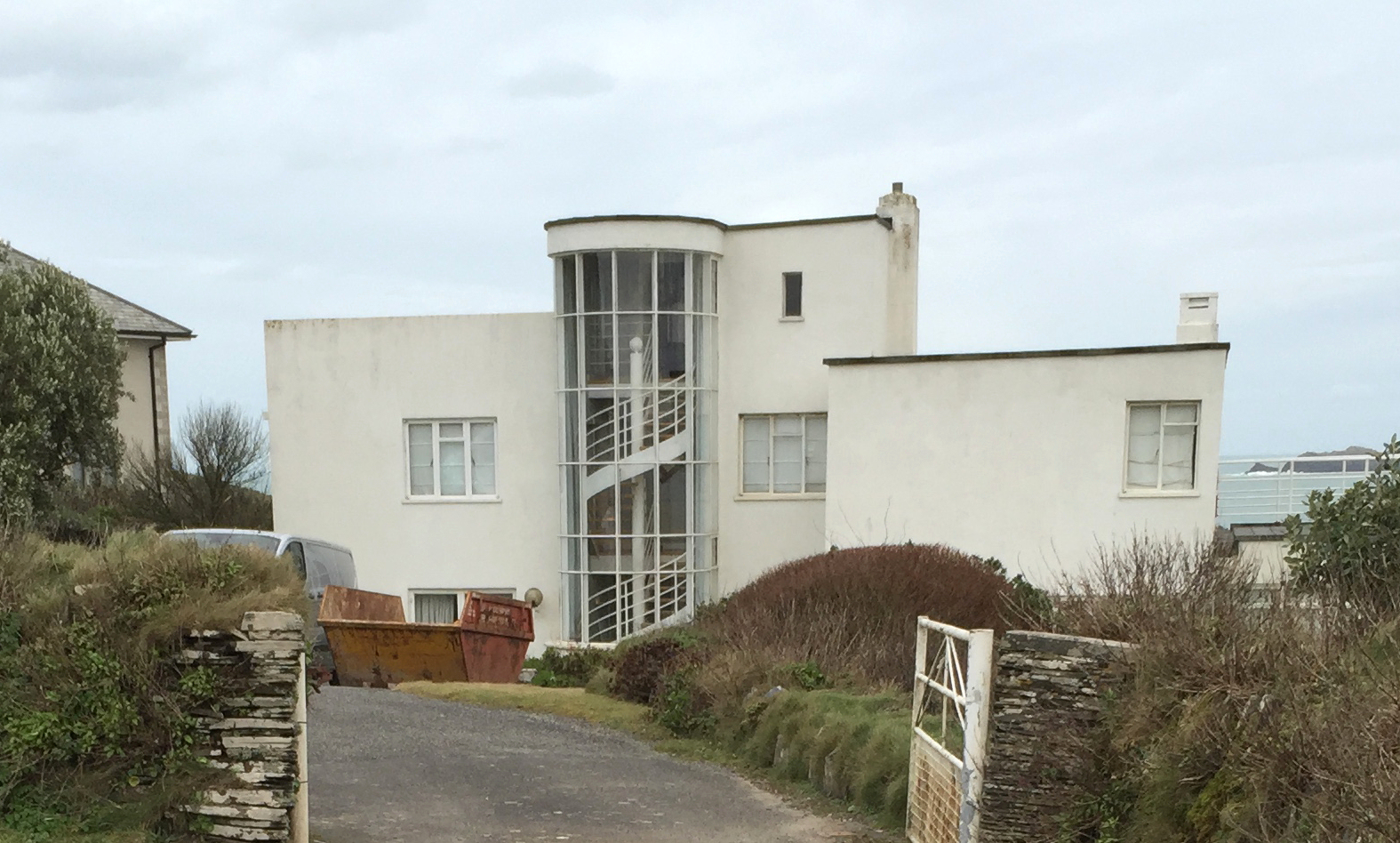

- Location within Cornwall
- 50.54757°N 5.02221°W
- Location: Trevose, St Merryn, Cornwall, England

Listed Building – Grade II
- Official name: Polventon
- Designated: 20 May 1988
- Reference no.: 1289389

Polventon House is a grade II listed private house overlooking Mother Ivey's Bay near Padstow in Cornwall, England.

It was built in the International Style on a clifftop in 1936 for R.H. Stein, father of English celebrity chef Rick Stein. Rick Stein spent the summers of his childhood in the house, which he visited in some of his TV series, such as Rick Stein's Cornwall.
