= The Archer's Craft =

- First edition
- Author: A. E. Hodgkin
- Language: English
- Publisher: Faber
- Publication date: 1951
- ISBN: 1-897853-80-7

The Archer's Craft (ISBN 1-897853-80-7, first published in 1951) by A. E. Hodgkin is a book on the making and use of traditional English and Welsh bows. The book describes how to make both longbows and short hunting bows and arrows. It also describes hunting with the bow and on its history and place in English culture of the yeoman class and royal mandates. It draws inspiration and often quotes from the 16th century Toxophilus written by Roger Ascham.
