= Constantine Bay =

Village in Cornwall, England

Coordinates: 50.53036°N 5.01245°W

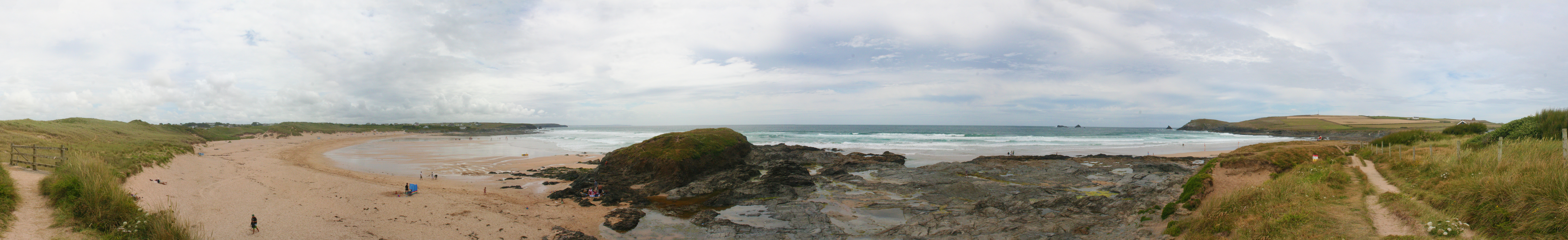
Panoramic showing Constantine Bay in July 2010

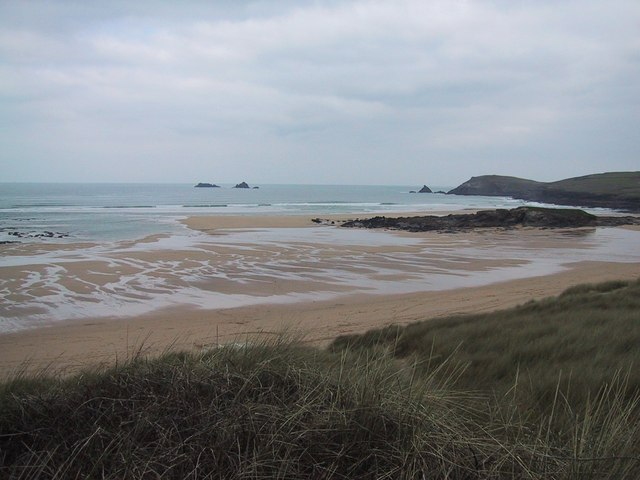
Constantine Bay

Constantine Bay (Cornish: Egloskostentin, meaning church of St Constantine) is a village and beach on the Atlantic coast of north Cornwall, England, United Kingdom. It is situated approximately three miles (5 km) west of Padstow and is in the parish of St Merryn. The beach is sandy and is popular with surfers and has lifeguard patrols in the summer. Historically the sand was removed by local farmers by horse and cart to spread on the land to lighten and fertilise the heavy soil.

Constantine Bay is named after Saint Constantine, a 6th-century Cornish saint possibly identified with a minor British king Constantine. St Constantine's Well, an historic site, is accessible by public right of way on Trevose Golf Club's golf course. The area was a favourite holiday location of Margaret Thatcher during her premiership and also of former Prime Minister David Cameron.

Trevose Head and Constantine Bay SSSI is designated for both its biological and geological interests. The dune system at Constantine Bay is in an unfavourable declining condition because of the invasion by species such as bramble, ivy and sea buckthorn; and by visitor pressure causing erosion.

Constantine Bay lies within the Cornwall Area of Outstanding Natural Beauty (AONB).

Other coastal villages nearby include Harlyn, Porthcothan, Trevone and Treyarnon
