= Toxophilus =

1545 book about archery by Roger Ascham

Henry VIII, the dedicatee of Toxophilus

Toxophilus is a book about longbow archery by Roger Ascham, first published in London in 1545. Dedicated to King Henry VIII, it is the first book on archery written in English.

Ascham was a keen archer and a lecturer at St John's College, Cambridge, and wrote Toxophilus or the Schole or Partitions of Shooting to defend archery against claims that it was a sport unbefitting a scholar.

Toxophilus is written in the form of a dialogue between two characters, Philologus ("a lover of study") and Toxophilus ("a lover of the bow"), who is also a scholar and defends archery as a noble pastime.

Ascham prefixed his work with an elaborate dedication to Henry VIII, who approved of the book and granted Ascham a pension of £10 a year, which was confirmed and augmented by Edward VI.

== Influence on English ==
As well as being the earliest printed book in English about archery, Toxophilus is also important as a model for how books of instruction could be written in English (rather than Latin) and how English could be written in a clear style, for as he remarks in his preface "To All Gentle Men and Yeomen of England": "Many English writers have not done so, but using strange words, as Latin, French, and Italian, do make all things dark and hard."

So, unlike other scholars writing in English at the time, such as Thomas Elyot and John Cheke, he avoided neologisms and flowery classical terms, and "succeeded in making his English work as a vehicle of wide communication ... Some of the passages describing the environment (for example, the way in which the wind could interfere with the aim of an expert archer) were vivid and at the time unparalleled in English writing."

The word "Toxophilus" was invented by Ascham. The noun "toxophilite", meaning "a lover or devotee of archery, an archer", is derived from it.

== History of archery ==
The next major work on archery in English was The Art of Archerie by Gervase Markham, published in London in 1634.

Toxophilus has served as a source book for many subsequent works on the history of archery, for example The Archer's Craft by A. E. Hodgkin.

== Editions ==
- Ascham, Roger; ed. Arber, Edward (1868). English Reprints: Toxophilus, 1545. London: Murray.
- Ascham, Roger; ed. Wright, William Aldis (1904). English Works: Toxophilus, Report of the Affaires and State of Germany, The Scholemaster. Cambridge: Cambridge University Press.

== See also ==
- 16th century in literature
