= Edward Alexander Newell Arber =

British palaeobotanist (1870-1918)

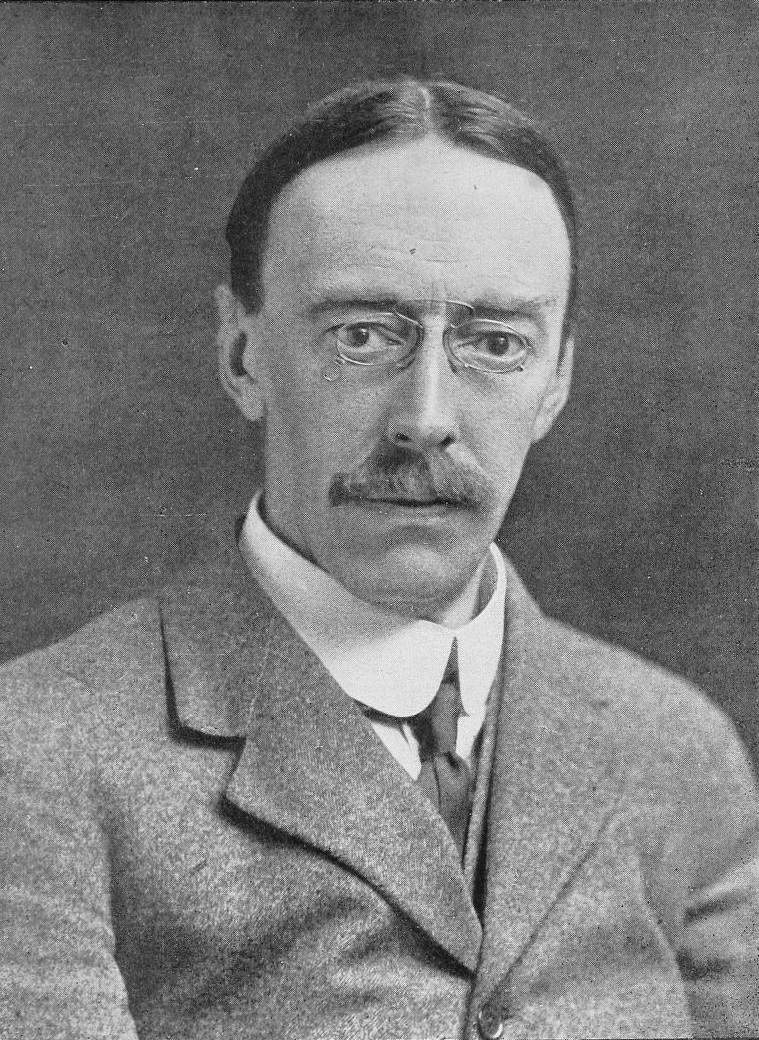
- Born: 5 August 1870; London, England
- Died: 14 June 1918 (aged 47); Cambridge, England
- Scientific career
- Fields: Botany, paleontology

Edward Alexander Newell Arber (5 August 1870 – 14 June 1918) was an English botanist and paleontologist. His father was the literary scholar and anthologist Edward Arber.

Arber was born at No. 5 Queen Square, Bloomsbury. Sent to Davos in Switzerland at the age of 15 for health reasons he developed an interest in botany. Returning home he studied Botany and Geology at Trinity College, Cambridge (1895-1899), where he later became a professor, specialising in palaeobotany. From 1899 until the end of his life he was appointed demonstrator in Palaeobotany in the Woodwardian [later Sedgwick] Museum in Cambridge. Between 1901 and 1906 he worked on the naming and arrangement of the palaeobotanical specimens in the Geology Department of the British Museum.

He married plant morphologist and philosopher Agnes Robertson in 1909. They had many interests in common, and his marriage was described as 'happy'. They had one child, a daughter. He died in 1918 following a period of ill health.

== Works ==
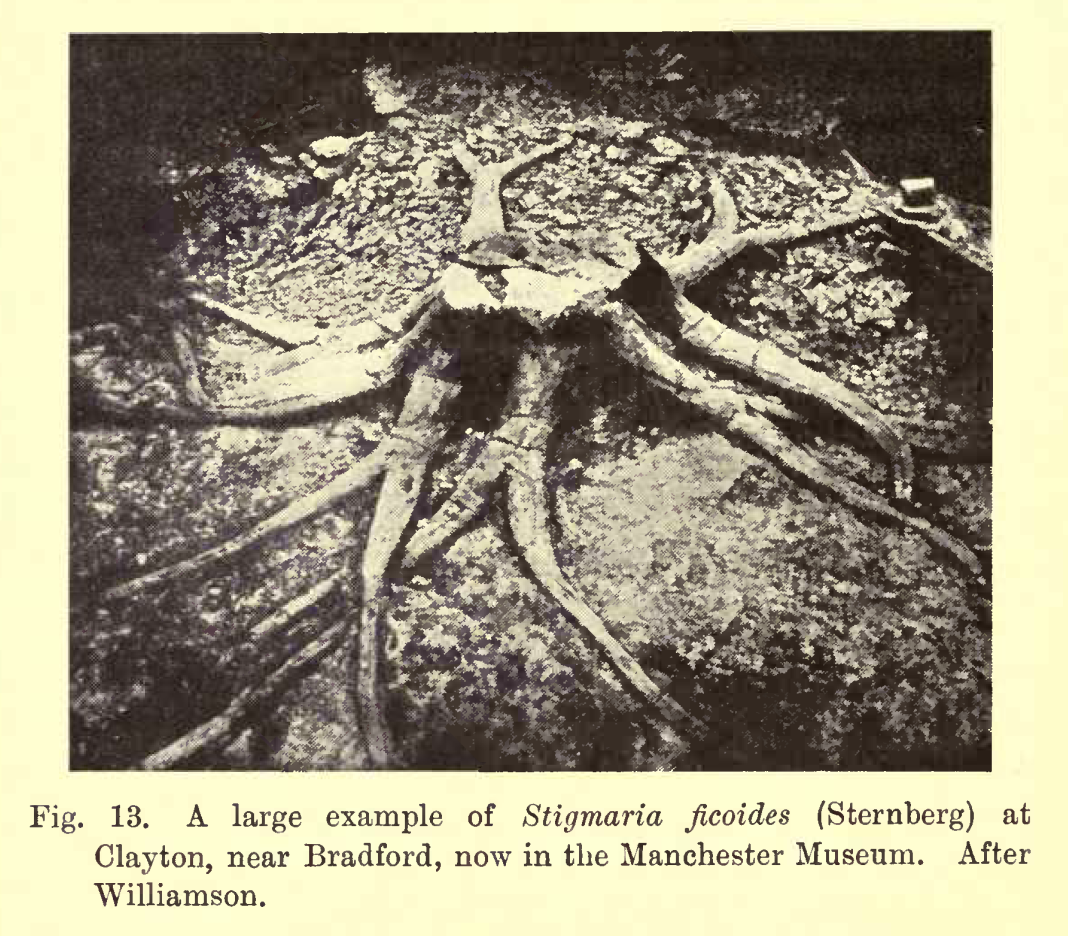
Fossil trunk of Stigmaria ficoides, from The Natural History of Coal

Partial list

- 1905. Catalogue of the fossil plants of the Glossopteris flora in the department of geology, British Museum (natural history): being a monograph of the permo-carboniferous flora of India and the southern hemisphere. Ed. Longmans. 255 pp.
- 1910. Plant life in Alpine Switzerland: being an account in simple language of the natural history of Alpine plants. Ed. J. Murray. 355 pp.
- 1911. The Natural History of Coal. Ed. University Press. 163 pp. Reeditó en 2008 Kessinger Publ. 176 pp. ISBN 0548907919
- 1911. The coast scenery of North Devon: being an account of the geological features of the coast-line extending from Porlock in Somerset to Boscastle in North Cornwall, Ed. J.M. Dent & Sons, Ltd. 261 pp.
- 1917. The earlier mesozoic Floras of New Zealand. Volumen 6 de New Zealand. Dep. of Mines. New Zealand Geol. Survey. Palaeontological Bulletin. 80 pp.
- 1921. Devonian Floras; a study of the origin of Cormophyta. 100 pp. Reprinted in 2010 General Books LLC. 62 pp. ISBN 9781153342421

The standard author abbreviation E.Arber is used to indicate this person as the author when citing a botanical name.
