= Robert Pember =

English classical scholar

Robert Pember (died 1560) was an English classical scholar. He was a reader in Greek at Trinity College, Cambridge and taught Roger Ascham Greek.

Robert Pember was of a Herefordshire family. He studied at Cambridge University, graduating B.A. in 1523/4 and M.A. in 1527. He became a fellow of St John's College, Cambridge in 1524. In 1546 he became one of the original fellows of Trinity College, and was a reader in Greek there until his death in 1560. He retained his post at Trinity in 1555 by subscribing to the Roman Catholic articles.

He died in 1560 at Trinity College.
