= Trevose Head =

Headland in north Cornwall, England

Coordinates: 50.54785°N 5.03191°W

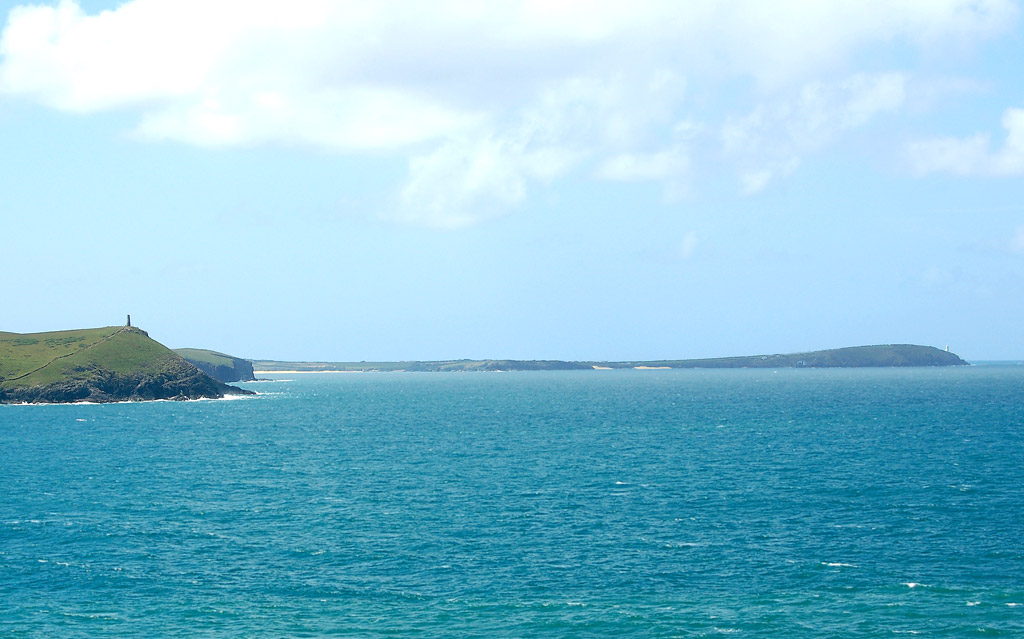
Trevose Head (right of photo) seen from the north-west (the two nearer headlands (left of photo) are Stepper Point and Gunver Head)

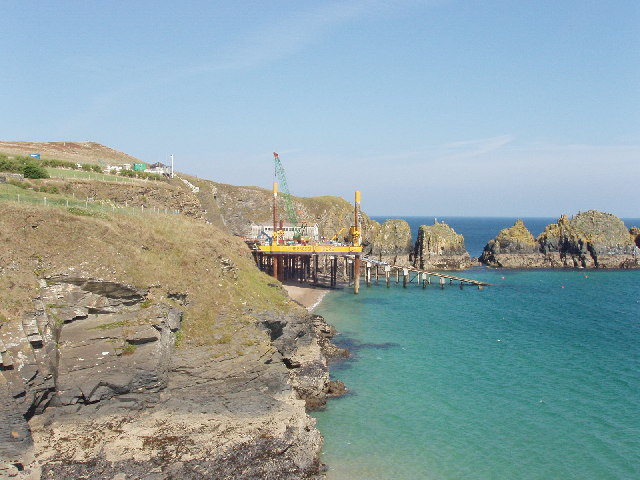
Trevose Head Lifeboat Station

Trevose Head (Cornish: Penn Trenfos, meaning headland of the walled farmstead) (grid reference SW853764) is a headland on the Atlantic coast of north Cornwall, on the south-western coast of Great Britain. It is situated approximately 5 miles (8.0 km) west of Padstow. The South West Coast Path runs around the whole promontory and is within the Cornwall Area of Outstanding Natural Beauty and the Trevose Head Heritage Coast. In clear weather, visitors to Trevose Head can see virtually the whole length of the north Cornwall coast; to the north, the view extends beyond the Cornwall county boundary to Hartland Point (40 miles (64 km)), Devon; to the south, it extends beyond St Ives to the headland at Pendeen Watch (35 miles (56 km)).

LB&SCR H2 class 4-4-2 no. 425 (later no. B425, 2425, and 32425) was named Trevose Head after this landmark.

== History ==
The ruins of St Constantine's chapel can be visited at hole 3 of Trevose Golf Club along an ancient right of way. The club is situated between Constantine Bay and Mother Ivey's Bay, behind Booby's Bay.

Trevose Head Lighthouse, maintained by Trinity House, is on the north-west corner of the headland and the Padstow lifeboat is stationed on the east side of Trevose Head. The lighthouse was first lit on 1 December 1847; initially there was an upper and lower light with the lower light no longer used after 1882. The last of the resident keepers left the lighthouse on 20 December 1995 following automation. A lifeboat was established at Padstow before 1825 and in 1967 the lifeboat station was moved from Hawkers Cove to Trevose Head due to silting of the River Camel. The present station was completed in July 2006 and came into service shortly after.

In September 1940, during World War II, there is a record of bombs being dropped on Trevose Head, although it is suspected that these were jettisoned rather than the headland being deliberately targeted.

Approximately 217 acres (88 ha) of Trevose Headland was put up for sale in March 2016, comprising 137 acres (55 ha) of agricultural land and 80 acres (32 ha) of coastal rough grazing and slope. The area had been in the ownership of the same family since circa 1900.

== Natural history ==
The headland is within the Trevose Head and Constantine Bay Site of Special Scientific Interest (SSSI) which is designated for both its biological and geological interests. Wild asparagus (Asparagus prostratus) grows on the cliffs of Dinas Head and shore dock (Rumex rupestris) at the base of the cliffs. The cliffs are also important for breeding northern fulmar (Fulmarus glacialis), razorbill (Alca torda) and guillemot (Uria aalge).
