= Constantine (British saint) =

Local English saint

Saint Constantine is the name of one or many British or Pictish saints.

== Identification ==
=== South-west Britain ===
A Saint Constantine is revered in Devon and Cornwall. Based purely on similarity of a common name, some have identified him with the monarch Constantine of Dumnonia, despite the latter's condemnation for immoral behaviour by Gildas. If this is correct, he must have mended his ways. He gives his name to the parish church of Milton Abbot in Devon and the villages of Constantine and Constantine Bay in Cornwall, also extinct chapels in Illogan and Dunterton. The saint at Constantine Bay was almost certainly the 'wealthy man' of this name mentioned in the Life of Saint Petroc. He was converted to Christianity by that holy man at nearby Little Petherick after the deer Constantine was hunting took shelter with him. A Constantine "King of the Cornishmen" also appears in the Life of Saint David as having given up his crown in order to enter this saint's monastery at St David's.

=== Scotland and Ireland ===
The conversion of a Constantine is recorded in the Annals of Ulster in 588, and a Constantine appears in the Breviary of Aberdeen as entering a monastery in Ireland incognito before joining Saint Mungo (alias Kentigern) and becoming a missionary to the Picts. He was martyred in Scotland about 576 and John of Fordun tells how he was buried at Govan (where his shrine can still be seen today). Although revered on the same day as the Cornishman, the date has probably been transferred from one to the other. The Life of Saint Kentigern names a Constantine as the son and successor Riderch Hael, king of Alt Clut, later known as Strathclyde.

== Veneration ==
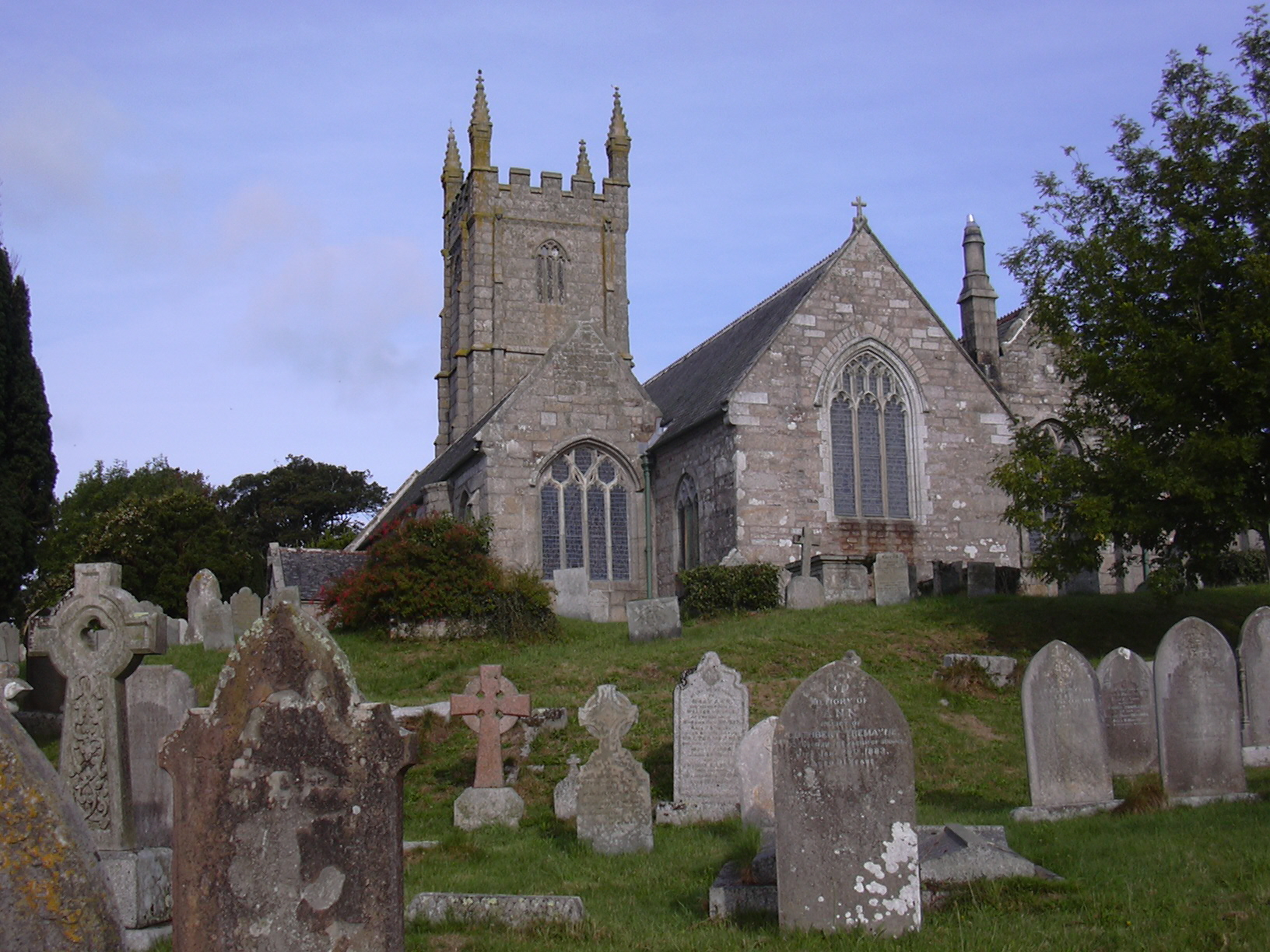
Constantine in Kerrier: the 15th-century Church, dedicated to Saint Constantine

The cult of Saint Constantine (of Dumnonia) centred on the two places bearing his name, both of which may have originally supported monastic establishments. The ruined chapel at Constantine Bay also has a nearby holy well (uncovered in 1911). Taking the waters there was said to bring rain during dry weather. The chapel's splendid font is now in the parish church at St Merryn. The name of the village of Constantine is recorded as Sanctus Constantinus in the Domesday Book. However, the monasteries seem to have declined into parish churches, after the Norman Conquest. The present Kerrier building is 15th century and bears no remnants of Constantinist iconography. The saint's day is generally celebrated on 9 March. An annual "Feast" is held in the village of Constantine, on the Sunday nearest to 9 March.

== Sources ==
- Henderson, Charles (d. 1933) (1937). G. H. Doble (ed.). A history of the parish of Constantine in Cornwall. Truro: Royal Institution of Cornwall. pp. 42–43 and footnote.
- Doble, G. H. (1962). The Saints of Cornwall Vol. 2: saints of the Lizard district. Dean & Chapter of Truro, pp. 15–24.
- Geoffrey of Monmouth; Thorpe, Lewis (translator) (1966). The History of the Kings of Britain. London: Penguin Books. ISBN 0-14-044170-0.
- Olson, Lynette (1989). Early monasteries in Cornwall (Studies in Celtic History series). Woodbridge, Suffolk: Boydell Press. ISBN 0-85115-478-6.
- Orme, Nicholas (2000) The Saints of Cornwall. Oxford University Press ISBN 0-19-820765-4
