= Porthcothan =

Village in Cornwall, England

Coordinates: 50.5081°N 5.0221°W

Porthcothan: Cornish: Porthkehoodhon
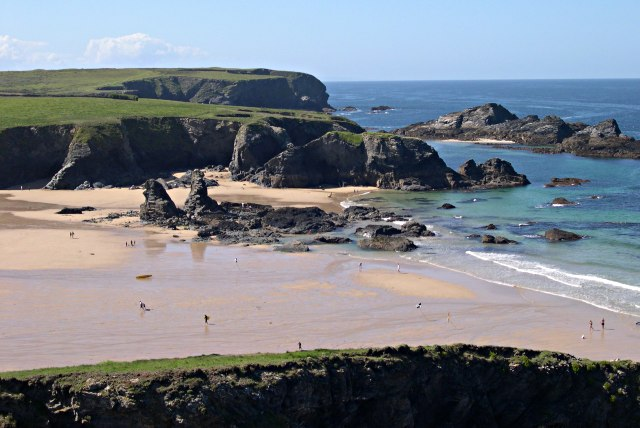
- Porthcothan beach looking down from the north at low tide, towards the former Arch rock

- Location within Cornwall
- OS grid reference: SW8574572018
- Civil parish: St Eval
- Unitary authority: Cornwall
- Ceremonial county: Cornwall
- Region: South West
- Country: England
- Sovereign state: United Kingdom
- Post town: PADSTOW
- Postcode district: PL28
- Dialling code: 01841
- Police: Devon and Cornwall
- Fire: Cornwall
- Ambulance: South Western
- UK Parliament: North Cornwall

Porthcothan (Cornish: Porthkehoodhon, meaning cove of open people) is a coastal village between Newquay and Padstow in Cornwall, England, UK. It is within the civil parish of St Eval.

Porthcothan lies within the Cornwall Area of Outstanding Natural Beauty (AONB). Almost a third of Cornwall has AONB designation, with the same status and protection as a National Park.

The sandy beach is popular with tourists and surfers and is patrolled by lifeguards during the day in the summer; local surf schools sometimes use the beach for tuition. There is a pay-and-display car park and a small grocery shop near the beach. In January 2014, storm Anne reduced a local arch, Jan Leverton's Rock, to rubble.

== History ==
As with many coves in Cornwall, Porthcothan has legends of smuggling, and there is a large cave some miles inland that is reputed to have been used to store smuggled goods.

== Notable people ==
Notable former residents include the early science fiction author J. D. Beresford and the playwright Nick Darke. The novelist D. H. Lawrence lived locally at one time, but did not get on with the local populace who accused him of spying during World War I.

== See also ==
Other coastal villages and bays nearby

- Harlyn
- Constantine Bay
- Trevone
- Treyarnon
- Carnewas & Bedruthan Steps

Other villages nearby

- St Merryn
