= Theodore Goulston =

English physician

Theodore Goulston M.D. (or Gulston) (1572–1632) was an English physician, scholar, and founder of the Goulstonian Lectures.

== Life ==
He was the son of William Goulston, rector of Wymondham, Leicestershire. He entered Merton College, Oxford, was elected a fellow in 1596, and graduated M.A. 8 July 1600, and M.D. 30 April 1610. He had before that practised at Wymondham, and after taking his final degree settled as a physician in the parish of St. Martin-extra-Ludgate in London, and was admitted a fellow of the College of Physicians, 29 December 1611. He was elected censor in 1615, 1616, 1625, and 1626.

He had in his own time a reputation for general learning, and a considerable practice as a physician. He died at his house in St. Martin's on Ludgate Hill 4 May 1632, and by his will, dated 26 April 1632, left £200 to the College of Physicians of London to found a lectureship, to be held in each year by one of the four youngest doctors of the college. These lectures were annually delivered from 1639, and have continued for more than three centuries.

== Works ==
In 1619 he published in London Versio Latina et Paraphrasis in Aristotelis Rhetoricam, with a dedication to Prince Charles in Latin prose, and his notes and Latin version were reprinted in the edition of the Greek text published at Cambridge in 1696. In 1623 he published Aristotelis de Poetica liber Latine conversus et analytica methodo illustratus, with a dedication in Latin verse to Prince Charles. This was later edited by James Upton. He also wrote Versio, variae lectiones, et annotationes criticae in opuscula varia Galeni, which was published in 1640, with a preface by his friend Thomas Gataker.
