= Edward Arber =

19th/20th-century English scholar and writer

- Born: 4 December 1836; London, England
- Died: 23 November 1912 (aged 75)
- Occupations: English academic and writer
- Spouse: Married in 1869
- Children: 2 including E. A. N. Arber
- Writing career
- Language: English
- Notable works: A Transcript of the Registers of the Stationers' Company; The Term Catalogues, 1668-1709/11.[2]

Edward Arber (4 December 1836 – 23 November 1912) was an English scholar, writer, and editor.

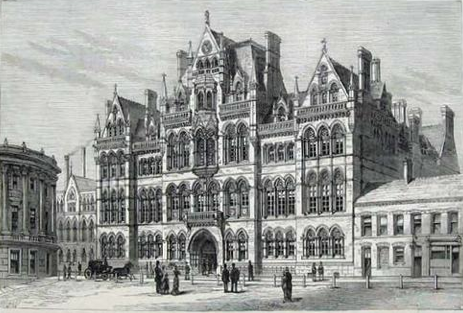
Mason College, now Birmingham University

== Background and professional work ==
Arber was born in London. From 1854 he 1878 he worked as a clerk in the Admiralty, and began evening classes at King's College London in 1858. In 1870 his address was No. 5 Queen Square, in Bloomsbury.

From 1878 to 1881 he studied English literature, under Henry Morley, at University College London; and from 1881 to 1894 he was professor of English at Mason College (which later became Birmingham University). From 1894 he lived in London as emeritus professor, being also a fellow of King's College London. In 1905 he received the honorary degree of D. Litt. from the University of Oxford. He married Marion Murray in 1869, and had two sons, one of whom, E. A. N. Arber, became demonstrator in palaeobotany at the University of Cambridge.

== Scholarly edits ==
As a scholarly editor, Arber made notable contributions to English literature. His name is associated particularly with the English Reprints series (1868–1871), by which an accurate text of the works of many English authors, formerly only accessible in more expensive editions, was placed within reach of the general public. Among the thirty volumes of the series were Stephen Gosson's School of Abuse, Roger Ascham's Toxophilus, Tottel's Miscellany, and Robert Naunton's Fragmenta Regalia. It was followed by the "English Scholar's Library" (16 volumes) which included the Works (1884) of Captain John Smith, governor of Virginia, and the Poems (1882) of Richard Barnfield.

== Anthologies and bibliographies ==
In his eight volume English Garner (1877–1890) Arber collected rare old tracts and poems, "ingatherings from our history and literature". Between 1899 and 1901 he issued the ten volume British Anthologies set:

- 1) The Dunbar Anthology
- 2) The Surrey and Wyatt Anthology
- 3) The Spenser Anthology
- 4) The Shakespeare Anthology
- 5) The Jonson Anthology
- 6) The Milton Anthology
- 7) The Dryden Anthology
- 8) The Pope Anthology
- 9) The Goldsmith Anthology
- 10) The Cowper Anthology

During and after the first World War, T.S. Eliot used to recommend The Shakespeare Anthology for students of his University Extension classes on Elizabethan Literature in London. In 1907 Arber began a series called A Christian Library. He was the sole editor of two vast English bibliographies: A Transcript of the Registers of the Stationers' Company, 1553–1640 (1875–1894), and The Term Catalogues, 1668–1709/11.
