= Roger Ascham =

English scholar and didactic writer (1515-1568)

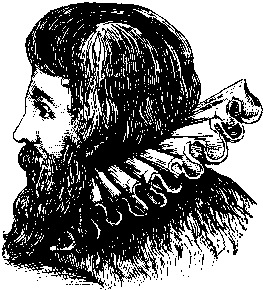
- Sketch of Ascham
- Born: c. 1515; Kirby Wiske, Yorkshire, England
- Died: 30 December 1568 (aged 52–53); London, England
- Education: St John's College, Cambridge
- Occupations: Scholar, didactic writer
- Notable work: The Scholemaster

Roger Ascham (/ˈæskəm/; c. 1515 – 30 December 1568) was an English scholar and didactic writer, famous for his prose style, his promotion of the vernacular, and his theories of education. He served in the administrations of Edward VI, Mary I, and Elizabeth I, having earlier acted as Elizabeth's tutor in Greek and Latin between 1548 and 1550.

== Early life ==
Ascham was born at Kirby Wiske, a village in the North Riding of Yorkshire, near Northallerton, the third son of John Ascham, steward to Baron Scrope of Bolton. The name Ascham is derived from Askham near York. His mother, Margaret, is said to have come from the Conyers family, but this is speculation. Thomas and John were Roger's two elder brothers, while Anthony Ascham was the youngest son of the Ascham family. The authority for this statement, as for most here concerning Ascham's early life, is his close friend Edward Grant (1540s–1601), headmaster of the venerable and still extant Royal College of St. Peter at Westminster—better known as Westminster School—who collected and edited his letters and delivered a panegyrical oration on his life in 1576.

== Education ==
Ascham was educated at the house of barrister Sir Humphrey Wingfield, Ascham tells us in the Toxophilus, under a tutor named R. Bond. His preferred sport was archery, and Sir Humphrey "would at term times bring down from London both bows and shafts and go with them himself to see them shoot". Hence Ascham's earliest English work, the Toxophilus, the importance which he attributed to archery in educational establishments, and probably the reason for archery in the statutes of St Albans, Harrow and other Elizabethan schools.

Through Toxophilus, Ascham sought to teach the art of shooting and present a literary piece with proper English vocabulary. He criticised other English authors for sprinkling foreign terms into their works. Prior to Toxophilus' publication, the bow had been forgotten by the English people with firearms evolving as the prevailing weapons of choice. The book sparked renewed interest in the practice of archery and Ascham was able to present it as an "innocent, salutary, useful, and liberal division". Many recognise the use of the bow as a disciplined skill, requiring more practice than any other instrument of offence.

From this private tuition Ascham was sent "about 1530", at the age, it is said, of fifteen, to St John's College, Cambridge, then the largest and most learned college in either university, where he devoted himself specially to the study of Greek, then newly revived. Equipped with a small knowledge of the Greek language, Ascham went on to read lectures and teach fellow St. John students the language. He believed that the best way to learn a language was by teaching it. Ascham was applauded for his encouragement of Greek learning in the university. In particular, Robert Pember, a fellow student, praised Ascham's lectures and his method of teaching a language in order to learn it. In a letter to Ascham, Pember stated that "he would gain more knowledge by explaining one of Aesop's Fables to a boy, than by hearing one of Homer's poems explained by another". Ascham was then appointed by the university to read Greek at open schools and received payment through honorary stipends. This was monumental for Ascham because at the time, there was no established lecturer of Greek at the university. Here he fell under the influence of Sir John Cheke, who was admitted a fellow in Ascham's first year, and Sir Thomas Smith. Cheke in turn was friendly with Anthony Denny, who was brother-in-law to Kat Ashley, governess to the Lady Elizabeth. His guide and friend was Robert Pember, "a man of the greatest learning and with an admirable ability in the Greek tongue".

He became B.A. in 1533–34, and was nominated to a fellowship at St John's. Nicholas Metcalfe was then master of the college, "a papist, indeed, and if any young man given to the new learning as they termed or went beyond his fellows", he "lacked neither open praise, nor private exhibition". He procured Ascham's election to a fellowship, "though being a new bachelor of arts, I chanced among my companions to speak against the Pope ... after serious rebuke and some punishment, open warning was given to all the fellows, none to be so hardy, as to give me his voice at election." The day of election Ascham regarded as his birthday", and "the whole foundation of the poor learning I have and of all the furtherance that hitherto elsewhere I have been tamed". He took his M.A. degree on 3 July 1537.

He stayed for some time at Cambridge taking pupils, among whom was William Grindal, who in 1544 became tutor to Princess Elizabeth. Thomas Ashton, who was a foundational headmaster of Shrewsbury School, and an influential Tudor dramatist was in the St John's College fellowship at the same time.

In 1540 he sent letters in both Greek and Latin to Edward Lee, the former adversary of Erasmus.

== Tutor to Elizabeth I ==
In January 1548, Grindal, the tutor of princess Elizabeth, died. Ascham, one of the ablest Greek scholars in England, as well as public orator of the university, had already been in correspondence with the princess. In one of Ascham's letters to Katherine Ashley, he enclosed a new pen, as well a pen which he himself mended specifically for princess Elizabeth. Through Cecil, and at the fourteen-year-old princess's own wish, he was selected as her tutor against another candidate, also named Grindal, who was pressed by Admiral Seymour and Queen Catherine. In 1548, Ascham began teaching Elizabeth, future queen of England, in Greek and Latin chiefly at Cheshunt, a job he held until 1550.

On the subject of his experience with Elizabeth's education, Ascham later wrote: "Yea, I beleve, that beside her perfit readines, in Latin, Italian, French, & Spanish, she readeth here now at Windsore more Greeke every day, than some Prebendarie of this Chirch doth read Latin in a whole weeke." Ascham's influence on Elizabeth is suggested by the fact that, for the remainder of her life, she remained an occasional writer of poems, such as "On Monsieur's Departure".

In a letter to Johannes Sturm, the Strassburg schoolmaster, Ascham praised Elizabeth's growth as a student: "She talks French and Italian as well as English: she has often talked to me readily and well in Latin and moderately so in Greek. When she writes Greek and Latin nothing is more beautiful than her handwriting . . . she read with me almost all Cicero and great part of Titus Livius: for she drew all her knowledge of Latin from those two authors. She used to give the morning to the Greek Testament and afterwards read select orations of Isocrates and the tragedies of Sophocles. To these I added St. Cyprian and Melanchthon's Commonplaces."

== Secretary to Richard Morrison ==
In 1550, Ascham had an unspecified quarrel with the court, which he described only as "a storm of recent violence and injury". As a result, Ascham returned to Cambridge. Whilst there, Cheke informed Ascham that he had been appointed secretary to Sir Richard Morrison (Moryson), appointed ambassador to Charles V. It was on his way to join Morrison that he paid visit to Lady Jane Grey at Bradgate, where he found her reading Plato's Phaedo while everyone else was out hunting. This final meeting between the two has been a cause of inspiration among many painters and writers as a grandiose romantic moment.

Ascham served in this position for several years, travelling widely on the European continent. The embassy went to Louvain, where he found the university very inferior to Cambridge, then to Innsbruck and Venice. Ascham read Greek with the ambassador Morrison four or five days a week. His letters during the embassy in 1553, which was recalled on Mary's accession, were later published as the Report and Discourse on Germany. The work, which was possibly a history of political turmoil in Germany in the 1550s, is incomplete. Common theories are that the work was either lost, damaged, or left unfinished.

== Latin Secretary to Mary I ==
Ascham's next job was an appointment as Latin Secretary to Mary I. Throughout the first few months he held the position, Ascham was bombarded with a torrent of work, which included countless letters. Through the efforts of Bishop Gardiner on his return to England, this office he likewise discharged to Queen Mary with a pension of £20 a year, and then to Elizabeth—a testimony to his tact and caution in those changeful times.

On 1 June 1554, he married Margaret Harleston, of South Ockendon, Essex, the daughter of Sir Clement Harleston. By her he had at least four sons and three daughters. Ascham was not a rich man, and when marrying Margaret, Ascham had to resign both his College Greek Readership and his University Public Oratorship. Margaret herself brought very little dowry, leaving Ascham to seek help from the connections he had made throughout the years. His relationship with Cardinal Reginald Pole led to Ascham's securing from the queen the reversion of a lease of the manor of Salisbury Hall in Walthamstow, Essex, a manor once owned by Pole's family.

== Death ==
Ascham became fatally ill on 23 December 1568, having just finished a poem of thanks for the blessings Queen Elizabeth I had bestowed on England through her reign. Ascham made his last confession to the parish priest of St Sepulchre-without-Newgate, William Gravet, simply saying "I want to die and be with Christ", according to Edward Grant. He died on 30 December 1568, most likely from malaria. Ascham was then buried on 4 January 1569 in St. Sepulchre-without-Newgate, in London.

== Publications ==
Ascham obtained from Edward Lee, then Archbishop of York, a pension of £2 a year, in return for which he translated Oecumenius' Commentaries on the Pauline Epistles but the archbishop, scenting heresy in some passage relating to the marriage of the clergy, sent it back to him.

=== Toxophilus ===
Ascham's first published work, Toxophilus ("Lover of the Bow") in 1545, was dedicated to Henry VIII. The objects of the book were twofold, to commend the practice of shooting with the long bow, and to set the example of a higher style of composition than had yet been attempted in English. Ascham presented the book to Henry VIII at Greenwich soon after his return from the capture of Boulogne, and received a grant of a pension of £10 a year. Toxophilus was the first book on archery in English. The work is a Platonic dialogue between Toxophilus and Philologus. Editions were published in 1571, 1589 and 1788, and by Edward Arber in 1868 and 1902.

=== The Scholemaster ===
In 1563 Ascham began the work The Scholemaster, published posthumously in 1570, which ensured his later reputation. Richard Sackville, he states in the book's preface, told him that "a fond schoolmaster" had, by his brutality, made him hate learning, much to his loss, and as he had now a young son, whom he wished to be learned, he offered, if Ascham would name a tutor, to pay for the education of their respective sons under Ascham's orders, and invited Ascham to write a treatise on "the right order of teaching". The Scholemaster was the result.

Not a general treatise on educational method, the book concentrates on the teaching of Latin; and it was not intended for schools, but "specially prepared for the private brynging up of youth in gentlemen and noblemens houses". It advocated "the double translation of a model book", the book recommended being Sturmius's Select Letters of Cicero; the method itself was not new. The book's plea for gentleness and persuasion instead of coercion in schools, was contemporary: it was being practised and preached at that time by Christopher Jonson (c. 1536–1597) at Winchester College; and had been repeatedly urged by Erasmus and others. Along with its suggestions for educational practice, Ascham's book includes a famous warning against the dangers of Italy, which he calls "inchantementes of Circes".

The Scholemaster was reprinted in 1571 and 1589. It was edited by James Upton in 1711 and in 1743, by John Eyton Bickersteth Mayor 1863, by Edward Arber in 1870 (reprints in 1888, 1895, 1903, 1910, 1927), by J. Holzamer (Vienna, 1881), and by Henry Morley in 1888 (Cassell's National Library, no. 137; and reprints). In the twentieth century, it was included in series of English classics, in editions for use in schools: Methuen's English Classics (1934, ed. D. C. Whimster), Dent University Paperbacks (1966, ed. R.J. Shoeck), Folger Shakespeare Library (1967, ed. L.V. Ryan).

=== Correspondence ===
Ascham's letters were collected and published in 1576, and went through several editions, the last at Nuremberg in 1611. They were re-titled by William Elstob in 1703.

=== Other works ===
Report and Discourse of the Affairs and State of Germany 1553 was published by John Daye (1570). Ascham's English works were edited by James Bennett, with a life by Samuel Johnson in 1771, reprinted in 1815. John Allen Giles in 1864–1865 published in 4 vols. select letters from the Toxophilus and Scholemaster and the life by Edward Grant.

== Legacy ==
- His character Euphues was referred to in Thomas Lodge's Rosalynde, which was the source book for William Shakespeare's As You Like It.
- Euphues was also referred to by John Lily in his literary work.
- Ascham School, in Sydney, Australia, is named after Roger Ascham.
- Roger Ascham Primary School in Walthamstow, London is named after Roger Ascham.
- Roger Ascham Primary School on Ascham Road in Cambridge, England, which closed in 1987

== Bibliography ==
- 1767 - The English works of Roger Ascham. Preceptor to queen Elizabeth. Contains: The life of Roger Ascham; A report of the affairs of Germany, and the Emperor Charles's court; Toxophilus, or the school of shooting; The schoolmaster, or perfect way of bringing up youth, illustrated by the late learned Mr. Upton; Letters to Queen Elizabeth and others, now first published from the manuscripts

== Sources ==
- Lee, Sidney (1885). "Ascham, Roger" . In Stephen, Leslie (ed.). Dictionary of National Biography. Vol. 2. London: Smith, Elder & Co.
- "Roger Ascham". Encyclopædia Britannica. Encyclopædia Britannica Online Academic Edition. Encyclopædia Britannica Inc., 2013. Web. 24 Oct. 2013
