= Jonathan Toup =

British philologist (1713–1785)

Jonathan Oannes Toup (19 December 1713 – 19 January 1785) was an English philologist, classical scholar and critic.

== Early life and education ==
Toup was born at St Ives, Cornwall in December 1713 and baptised on 5 January 1714. After the death of his father in 1721, Toup's mother Prudence (née Busvargus) remarried, and Toup was adopted by her brother, William, the last male of the Busvargus family. Toup had one full sister, Mary, and two half-sisters, Prudence and Ann. After the death of Toup's stepfather in 1763, Toup's mother and all three of her daughters lived with him.

Toup was educated at St. Ives grammar school, and afterwards by the Rev. John Gurney, who kept a private school at St Merryn in Cornwall. From 15 March 1733 to 13 November 1739, Toup was battellar of Exeter College, Oxford, where John Upton was his tutor. He graduated B.A. on 14 October 1736, and later received his M.A. from Cambridge in 1756. He never married.

== Church positions ==
Toup was ordained a deacon on 6 March 1736, and three days later was licensed to the curacy of Philleigh in his native county. After two years, on 29 May 1738, he was licensed as curate of Buryan, also in Cornwall, having proceeded to priest's orders on the previous day. Through the influence of his uncle Busvargus, he was presented on 28 July 1750 to the rectory of St. Martin's-by-Looe, which position he held until his death.

When his name was once mentioned to the bishop of Exeter the response was "Toup,--who is Toup?" the reply being "A poor curate in your diocese, my lord, but the greatest Greek scholar in Europe".

== Achievements ==
Toup's reputation was established by his Emendationes in Suidam, the first part of which was published in 1760, the second part in 1764, and the third part in 1766. The Emendationes were followed by an Epistola Critica to Bishop Warburton in 1767, in which Toup made some derisive comments about Bishop Lowth, while flattering Warburton for his learning. A volume of Curae novissimae sive appendicula notarum et emendationum in Suidam was published in 1775.

Although the critical power and skill of these works earned Toup an immense reputation at home and abroad, he was also criticised for his "immoderate language" and "boorish conduct." One scholar called Toup "a piece of a coxcomb" having "superior airs"; another called him a "homo truculentus et maledicus" ("aggressive and slanderous man"). Although Toup was reviled by some, others allowed that he was very charitable to the poor of his parish, and that his excessive self-confidence could be attributed to the fact that he lived apart, without sufficient personal intercourse with other scholars. He was said to have possessed an "uncompromising independence of mind and a hatred of servility," and censure of others was with him more frequent than praise.

After a preparation of thirty-five years, Toup's edition of Longinus, in Greek and Latin, was published in 1778. This edition included notes and emendations by David Ruhnken, whose assistance was mentioned on the title page. However, Ruhnken later regretted providing assistance to Toup, feeling that Toup had taken credit for his work and had not even sent him a presentation copy of the work when it was completed.

== Later years ==
On 14 May 1774, when Toup was more than sixty years old, he was appointed by Bishop Keppel to a prebendal stall at Exeter and was admitted on 29 July 1776 to the vicarage of St Merryn, the parish in which he had been partly educated. These preferments he held, with his rectory, to his death.

For some years before his death, Toup's mental capacity was diminished, and he was cared for by his half-sister Ann and her three daughters. He died at St Martin's rectory on 19 January 1785 and was buried under the communion table of the church. His property was left to his nephew John Toup Nicolas.

A small marble tablet was erected to his memory on the south wall of the church by his niece Phillis Blake. The tablet states that the excellence of Toup's scholarship was "known to the learned throughout Europe." The inscription on a round brass plate beneath the tablet records that the cost was defrayed by the delegates of the Oxford University Press.
