= Mother Ivy's Bay =

Beach in Cornwall, England

Coordinates: 50.5467°N 5.0165°W

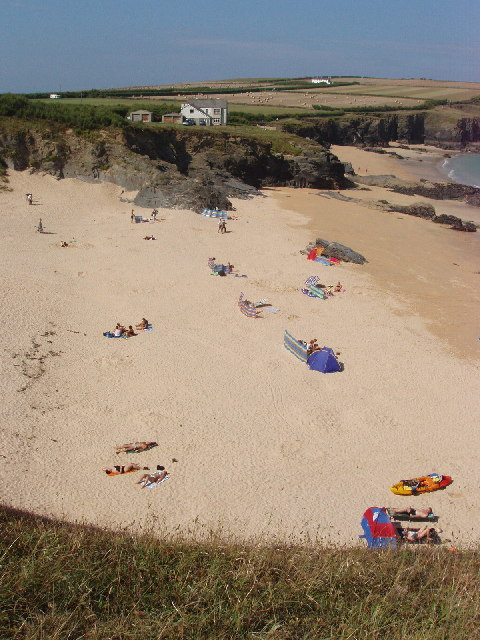
People sunbathing in the bay

Polventon Bay (Cornish: Poll Fenten, meaning pool of a spring), Mother Ivey's Bay is a bay and bathing beach on the north coast of Cornwall, United Kingdom. The bay is on east side of the headland, Trevose Head and within the parish of St Merryn. The South West Coast Path, which follows the coast of south-west England from Somerset to Dorset follows the cliff above the bay.

== History ==
The name Mother Ivey's Bay first appeared in 1870 and is named after a local wisewoman and white witch.

An auction for the ″Mother Ive Pilchard Fishery″ was held, on 30 September 1879, at the Western Hotel, St Ives. The sale was described as a going concern and included a nearly new, stone-built, slate-covered fish cellar with nineteen sleeping-berths, two seynes, two seine-boats, about thirty oars, horses, forty pilchard hogsheads, 170 tons of French salt, etc. The reserve price of £490 was not met. A second auction was held on 6 September 1881 and included 170 tons of French Salt.

== Popular culture ==
Cover photos for the 1982 album E già by Italian singer Lucio Battisti were taken here by photographer Gered Mankowitz.

== See also ==
- Polventon House
