= James Upton (schoolmaster) =

English clergyman, schoolmaster, and literary editor

James Upton (1670–1749) was an English clergyman, schoolmaster, and literary editor.

== Life ==
Upton was born at Wilmslow, Cheshire, on 10 December 1670. He was educated at Eton College, and was elected a fellow of King's College, Cambridge, where he graduated B.A. in 1697, and M.A. in 1701. At the request of John Newborough, the headmaster, Upton returned to Eton as an assistant master, around 1698.

In 1704, at the request of Lord Poulett and others, Upton moved from Eton to Ilminster Grammar School, Somerset, where he took pupils. In 1712, he was appointed headmaster of Taunton Grammar School, which became, according to Joshua Toulmin, the largest provincial school in England, having over two hundred boys. Before 1711 he received the rectory of Brimpton, near Yeovil, and in 1712 the rectory of Monksilver, near Taunton, both from the Sydenham family.

In 1731 Upton received the vicarage of Bishop's Hull, Somerset. He died at Taunton on 13 August 1749.

== Works ==
Upton edited Theodore Goulston's Poetics of Aristotle (1623), with selected notes, Cambridge, 1696; Dionysius of Halicarnassus, 1702 (reprinted 1728 and 1747); and Roger Ascham's Scholemaster, 1711 (reprinted 1743, 1761, and 1815). He published A Selection of Passages from Greek Authors, 1701 (revised 1726, 1775, 1776).

== Family ==
Upton married Mary Proctor of Eton, by whom he had six sons and two daughters. From the second daughter Ann descended the Tripp family of Huntspill and Sampford Brett, Somerset.

The second son was John Upton (1707–1760), now remembered as editor of the Faerie Queene.

== Notes ==
Attribution

This article incorporates text from a publication now in the public domain: Lee, Sidney, ed. (1899). "Upton, James". Dictionary of National Biography. Vol. 58. London: Smith, Elder & Co.
