= St Merryn =

Village in Cornwall, England

Coordinates: 50.526°N 4.991°W

St Merryn: Cornish: S Meryn
- Location within the United Kingdom
- Population: 1,606 2011 census
- OS grid reference: SW881738
- Civil parish: St Merryn
- Unitary authority: Cornwall
- Ceremonial county: Cornwall
- Region: South West
- Post town: PADSTOW
- Postcode district: PL28
- Dialling code: 01841
- Police
- Fire
- Ambulance
- UK Parliament: North Cornwall

St Merryn (Cornish: S. Meryn) is a civil parish and village in north Cornwall, England, United Kingdom. It is about 3.5 miles (5.6 km) south of the fishing port of Padstow and 11 miles (18 km) northeast of the coastal resort of Newquay.

The village has a primary school (St Merryn School, part of Kernow Learning), a veterinary practice, various shops, restaurants, and two public houses. The population at the 2011 census was 1,692.

== Geography ==
The 3,798 acre parish of St Merryn is bounded by a millstream to the south that separates it from the St Ervan and St Eval parishes; more than 5.5 miles (8.9 km) of coastline along the Atlantic Ocean; and the Padstow parish and Lyn stream.

The Seven Bays region of St Merryn includes (from west to east) Porthcothan Bay, Treyarnon Bay, Constantine Bay, Booby's Bay, Mother Ivey's Bay, Harlyn Bay and Trevone Bay. The nearest bay to St Merryn village centre is Harlyn Bay (1 mile; 1.6 km north). Interesting features include the seaside cliffs, like the Marble cliffs, Tregudda gorge, Trevose Head and the collapsed cave known as Round Hole. The North Cornwall Coastal Path follows the clifftops and crosses the Seven Bays. The B3276 is the largest road passing through the Seven Bays area.

== Toponymy ==
There are two theories about the namesake of the parish of St Merryn.

Visit Cornwall asserts that according to local historians the village and parish are named after a Welsh missionary priest named Merryn who came to St Merryn around 650 AD. It has also been proposed that Cornwall's St Merryn was a monk named Maruanus or Maruan. Which Merryn (or alternative spelling) this may be is debatable. Regarding Merryn son of Brychan, in his 1965 book series The Saints of Cornwall the scholar Gilbert Doble disputes assertions made by Charles G. Henderson that the Merryn in question may have been the "Marwenna found in William of Worcester's list of the Children of Brychan"

The benefice of St Merryn was named Vicaria Sancte Marine (the vicarage of St Marina) in 1259. It continued to be listed in church records as a form of Saint Marina until 1477 when it was named Seynt Meryn. There are two churches in France named after a Saint Marina or Marinus: Lanmérin for a male saint and the former Paris church of St Marina on the Île de la Cité. Churches named after a Celtic saint Merin include those in Llanferin, Gwent; Bodferin, Wales; and Plomelin, Brittany. Doble states that by the Middle Ages, the earlier Celtic saint was replaced by Marina of Bithynia.

Alban Butler describes the celebrated Saint Marina of Bithynia as a woman who lived and died during the 8th century. In her earnestness to live the life of a monk, she dressed and assumed the persona of a man. In 1228 she was identified by William of Paris as a titular saint (existing in title only) of a church in Paris. Her feast day is 17 July. The St Merryn feast day had been changed to the Sunday nearest to 7 July, Saint Thomas of Canterbury's feast day, when the church was rededicated to "The Blessed Meran and St. Thomas à Becket" during Henry VII's rule.

== History ==
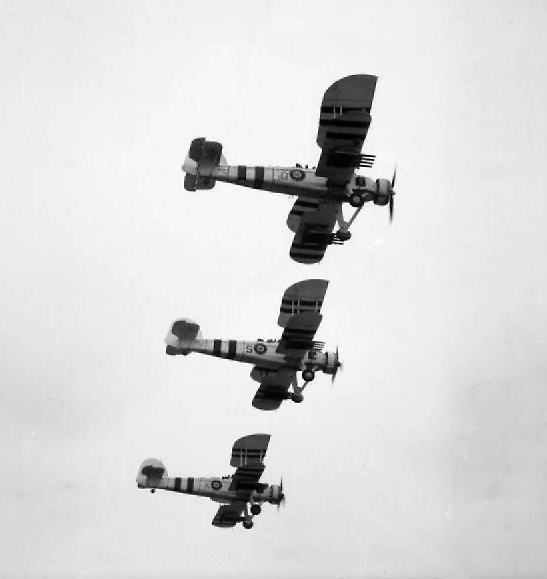
Three rocket-armed Fairey Swordfish of 774 Naval Air Squadron during a training flight from Royal Naval Air Station St. Merryn, Cornwall (UK).

=== St Merryn air field ===
RNAS St Merryn operated from 1937 to 1956 was also known as HMS Vulture and HMS Curlew. Initially the airfield was built with an airstrip and one hangar for civil purposes. In 1940, following construction of buildings for military use, it became an aircraft training centre for training for airborne observers and aircraft carrier flight manoeuvres. The airfield was renamed the RNAS St Merryn, HMS Vulture at that time. The following year German aircraft bombed the field; it was rebuilt in 1942. The Ward Room was housed within the Cornish Arms Inn; there is an honour roll posted at the location commemorating the aviators of the St Merryn air field. In 1952 the HMS Curlew unit joined the airfield for Naval reserve and airborne observer training. The field was closed for military purposes in 1956. There is limited aviation on the landing strips now and some of the former airfield is used for industry, farm land and leisure activity. The control tower and other airport buildings are visible in the area.

=== St Merryn beef shipment of 1999 ===
In August 1999 beef from a St Merryn slaughterhouse made the national news when it was the source of the first beef from the British mainland to be served in Brussels in three years. It signalled a re-emergence of British beef in the international marketplace since bovine spongiform encephalopathy (BSE), or more commonly, Mad Cow Disease, resulted in a shut down of beef exports. The shipment, coordinated by the Meat and Livestock Commission in Britain, came three weeks after the European Union lifted its ban on the import of British beef.

== Religion ==
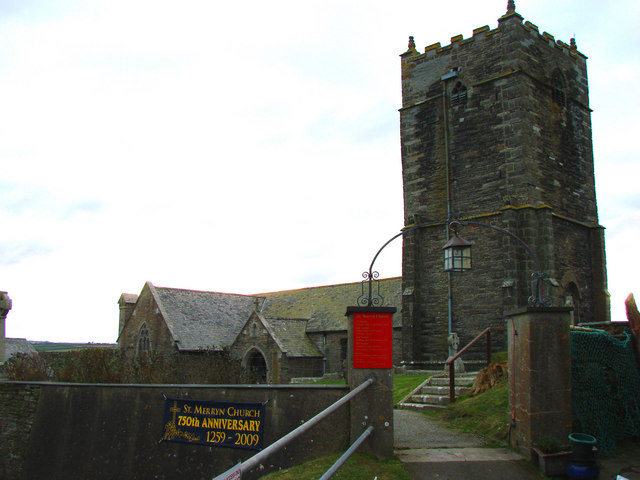
The Parish Church, St Merryn

=== St Merryn Church ===
The original dedication of the church was to St Merryn but in Norman times the saint was assumed to be a St Marina (see above, Toponymy). When the sainthood of Thomas Becket (Thomas of Canterbury) was ratified by Rome in 1338, a second dedication was made to him but it did not replace the St Merryn dedication. The first resident Vicar, John de Withiel, was installed on 2 July 1259. The church building is of Norman foundation but the chancel, south aisle and upper part of the tower are of the 15th century. The font of Cataclewse stone, quarried on Trevose Head, has carved figures of the twelve Apostles; It originally belonged to the chapel of St Constantine in the parish. Charles Henderson dated it as c. 1420 and gives the date of rebuilding the chancel as 1422.

The north transept was built about the 13th century. The piers of the aisle are also of Cataclewse stone. St Merryn Church has a 'wagon roof' built in 1422 and a tower with six bells. The 15th century church expansion included the addition of a south aisle of seven bays. The plaster coat of arms of Charles II, commissioned in 1662 by Harlyn House's Thomas Peter, is located near the tower. The church renovations occurred over two periods: once between 1887 and 1907 and again in 1962, when the west tower was rebuilt. The church became a Grade II building on 6 June 1969 and a Grade II* building on 20 May 1988.

Jonathan Toup was a prominent Vicar of St Merryn, 1776–1785. A small marble tablet erected to his memory by his niece Phillis Blake is on the south wall of the church. The tablet, which states that Toup's scholarship was "known to the learned throughout Europe," had funding from the delegates of the Oxford University Press. When the Diocese of Truro was formed from the Archdeaconry of Cornwall in the Diocese of Exeter on 15 December 1876 St Merryn Church was included in the new diocese.

The annual summer Church Fete "Roses Day Fun" is on Feast Day Sunday (nearest Sunday to 7 July), with stalls and activities in 'The Young Men's Green'.

=== St Constantine chapel ruins ===
The ruins of the Medieval St Constantine chapel include what is likely the 20 feet (6.1 m) high walls of the west tower. The shale and slate stone church was estimated to have been 40 by 24 feet (12.2 by 7.3 m) with a "nave and chancel, south aisle and west tower". The chapel was re-roofed in 1290, on orders from the Bishop of Exeter so the Vicar of St Merryn could hold mass on Sundays, Wednesdays and Fridays. The chapel's font is now in the parish church at St Merryn. Near the chapel ruins is a holy well which was uncovered in 1911. (Note: Or, 1917. The well may have been from the 14th century.) Taking the waters there was said to bring rain during dry weather. The ruins of the chapel still exist in the dunes (now a golf course) near Trevose.

=== St Merryn Methodist Church ===
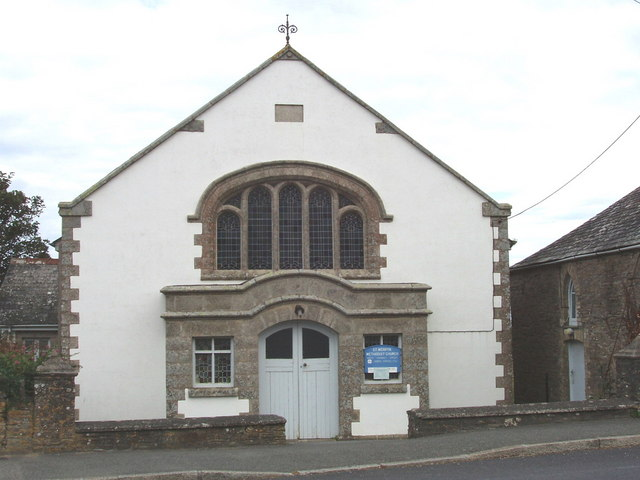
St Merryn Methodist Church

The St Merryn Methodist Church is a Wesleyan Methodist chapel which was completed in 1905. It is a single-storied, Arts and Crafts building with a rectangular plan, 2 light windows and a slate roof. The Grade II building was listed with the British Listed Buildings on 20 May 1988.

The original early 19th century chapel, made of stone rubble with a slate roof, was also a single-storied building with a rectangular plan. The building, with a two-windowed front and that sits close to the road, is now the site of an arts and crafts centre. The Grade II building was listed on 20 May 1988.

== Culture ==
In 1507 Thomas de Tregew donated a small field to "the youth of St Merryn for the celebration of Cornish sports". At that time the sports in question were Cornish wrestling and kales.

St Merryn is one of the places where Kayling was traditionally played. This game, similar to skittles, was played in the locality from at least the 16th century until the 20th century.

St Merryn was also one of the last villages to have a traditional cornish hurling match as part of their annual village festival, this being in honour of St Constantine.

In the summer, St. Merryn hosts a number of activities including the Great Atlantic Raft Race, St Merryn Vintage Steam Rally, St Merryn Carnival and other local festivals and community events. 'The Amazing Maize Maze' is sometimes held in the area. The Community Hall hosts auctions and events.

== Cornish wrestling ==
St Merryn has traditionally hosted many Cornish wrestling tournaments, for prizes, with records of tournaments going back to 1814.

The traditional place for tournaments was the de Tregew field. More recently there have been tournaments for prize money in the Green near the Drill Hall, in the field behind the Farmers' Arms and at the St Merryn Steam Rally.

In 1965, St Merryn hosted the Interceltic games.

== Economy ==
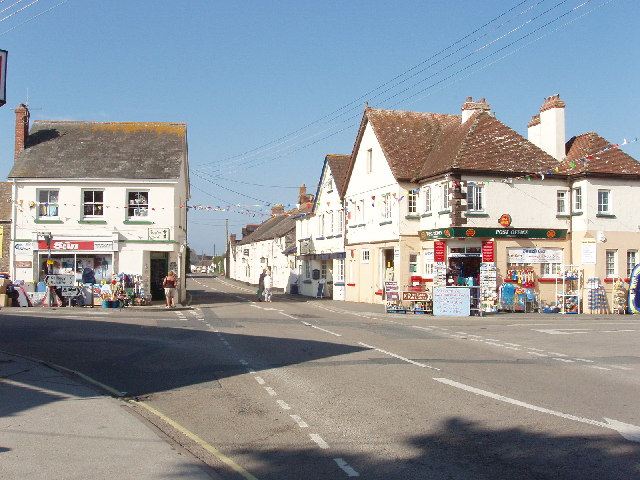
St Merryn shops

The past industries include tin-mining, smuggling, and fishing. Now, farming and tourism are the prime industries.

A mineral lode including Lead ore (Galena) and Copper ore (Chalcopyrite) runs within half a mile of St Merryn church, and from 1823 this was mined by Wheal Friendship mine, initially for silver. There was a further open cut on the same lode known as Trevorgus Mine sited south west of St Merryn, and in 1834 these amalgamated as Trevorgus and Treveglos Mines. The combined mine was abandoned in 1839, but in 1838 it produced only 24 tons of Lead Ore.

There are two old public houses in St Merryn, Farmers Arms Inn and Cornish Arms; the latter was taken over in 2009 by celebrity chef Rick Stein.

=== Tourism ===
Most of the Seven bays have lifeguard facilities, car parks, and public toilets during the summer months. Lodging choices include houses to let, hotels, caravan parks, holiday home parks, and campsites. About 2 miles (3.2 km) inland, on former St Merryn Airfield land, is land used for farming and leisure activity, like the Atlantic Bays, St Merryn Holiday Village and Maribou holiday home parks.

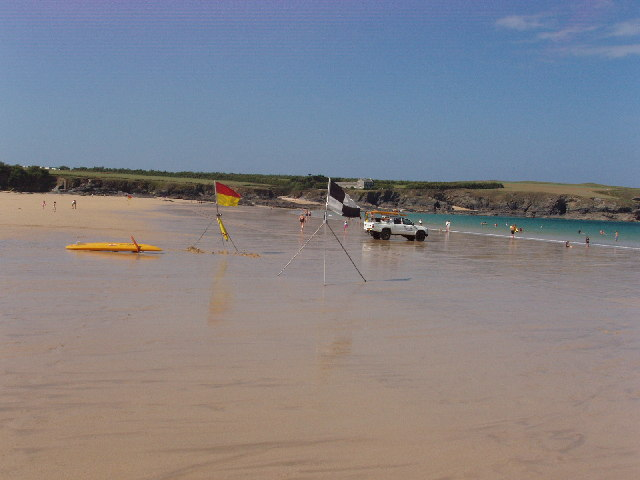
Beach lifeguards and swimming-surfing areas at Harlyn Bay, just north of St Merryn

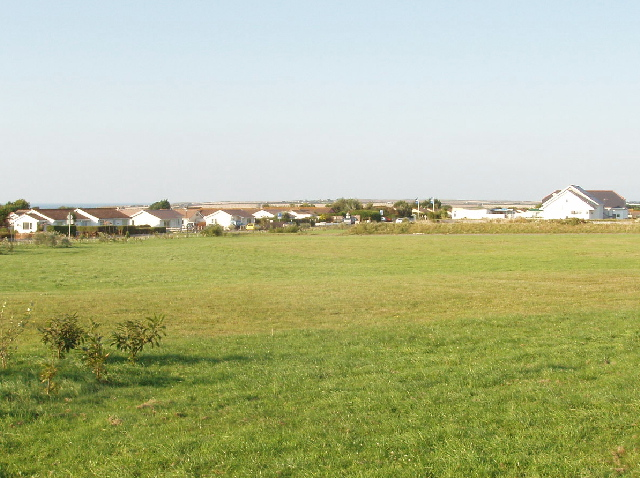
St Merryn Holiday Village

== Notable people ==
- Kenneth Gray, was made OBE for efforts for Age Concern and other community service programmes.
- William Peter, British diplomat and politician.
- Bridget Riley CH CBE artist and academic
