= Treyarnon =

Hamlet in Cornwall, England

Coordinates: 50.5266°N 5.0226°W

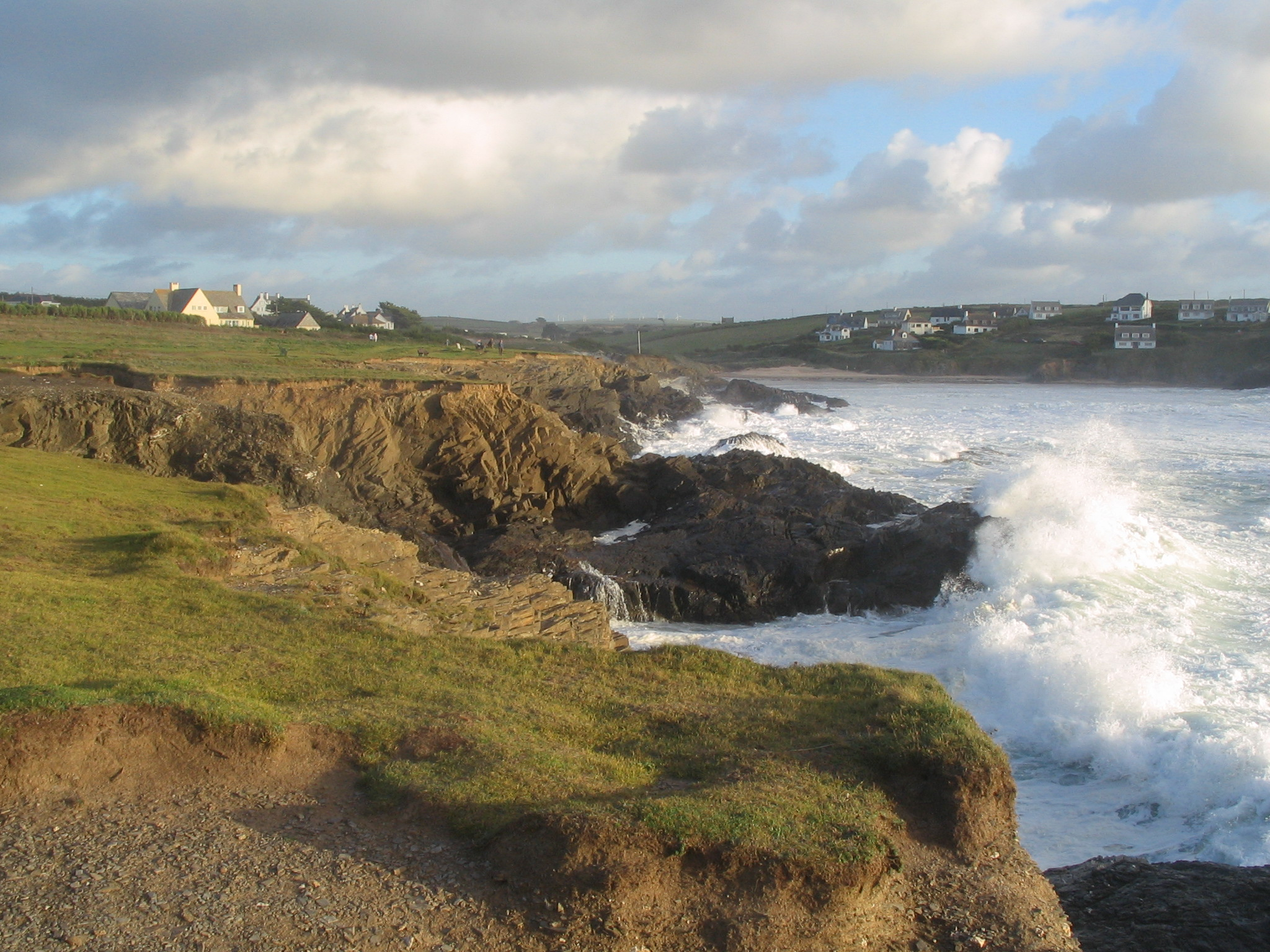
Treyarnon with Youth Hostel on the left

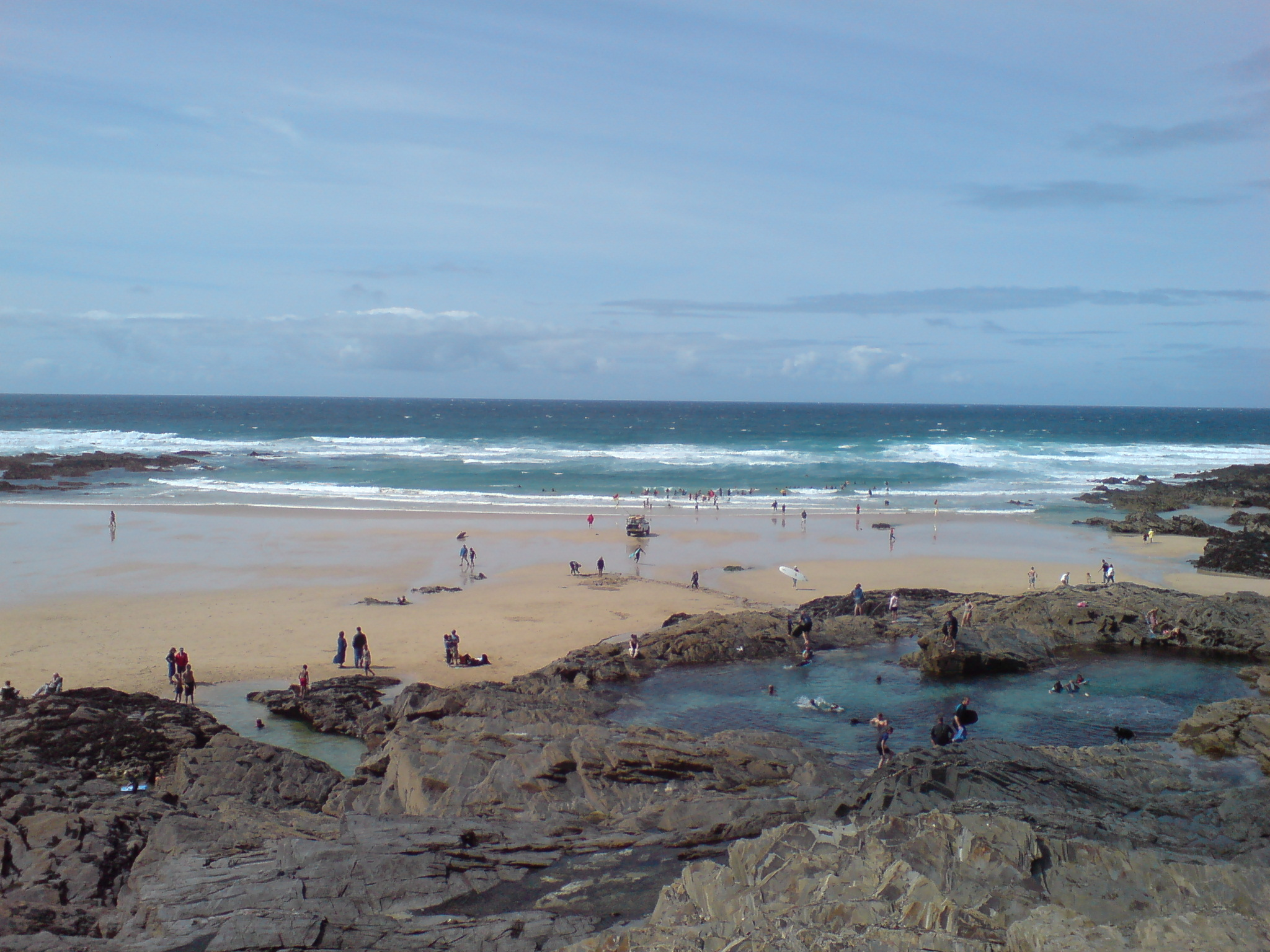
Treyarnon rockpools

Treyarnon (Cornish: Trearnen) is a hamlet west of St Merryn in Cornwall, England, UK near Padstow. Treyarnon Beach is a small beach nearby with a caravan park, Youth Hostel and café.

== Treyarnon Bay ==
Treyarnon has a car park (often full at busy times), toilet facilities and a useful shop (Treyarnon Bay Beach Store). It is a popular spot for bodyboarding, where most surfers go to the beach next door, Constantine Bay. Dogs are allowed all year around and there is lifeguard cover in the summer. The beach has a very dangerous left hand side. The tide comes in very quickly around the island on the left hand side, often leaving people cut off from the mainland. It has a partially constructed rockpool which acts as a swimming pool for older children at low tide.

The headland at the end of the beach features an island (Trethias Island) which is completely separated from the mainland by a steep, deep gulley. The gulley can be easily explored at low tide and there are plenty of jumping opportunities. At the end of the gulley on the left, there is an opening which leads to a large cave, this cave extends through the entire headland and emerges into the cove adjacent to Treyarnon. It is only accessible at low tide however and is extremely dangerous otherwise.

Many clifftop benches are dedicated to relatives of locals and visitors 'who loved this place'. 'Lark song and sea sound in the air, and splendour, splendour everywhere' is one inscription on a bench between Treyarnon and Constantine Bays. Another nearby is the mysterious 'The Captain and the Purple Lady - The sun is always over the yardarm'.

The South West Coast Path runs down the side of Treyarnon beach, across the back of the beach, and then along the other side of the beach. The coast hear runs north–south, the next beach to the north being Constantine and to the south being Porthcothan.

== Other bays ==
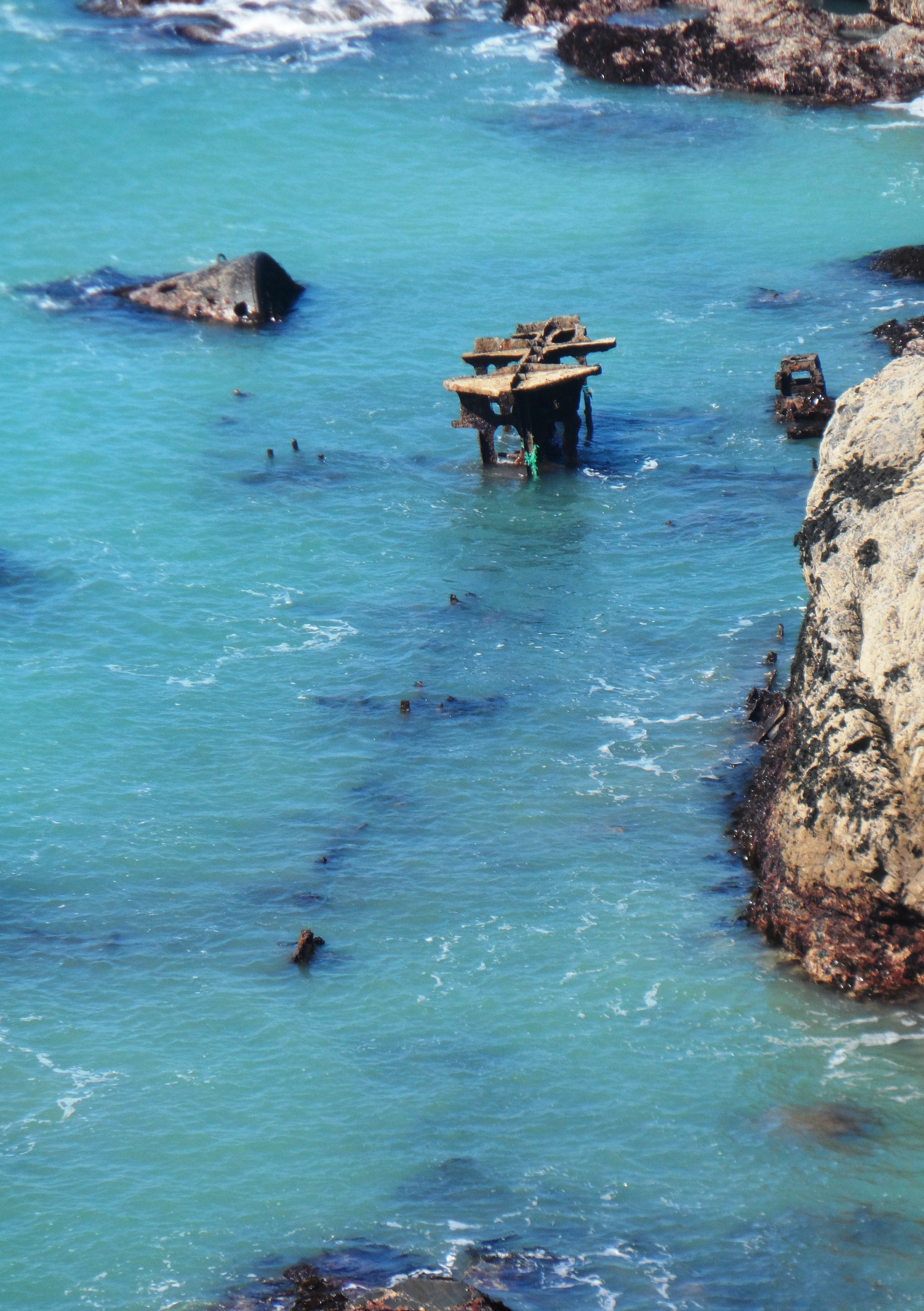
Remains of the wreck of the Hemsley I in Fox Cove in 2015

There are a series of small coves to the south of Treyarnon beach. In order, these are:

- Wine Cove
- Pepper Cove
- Warren Cove
- Fox Cove

The South West Coast Path runs at the back of these coves but they are inaccessible from the path. The cliffs around these coves are unstable, with a large rockfall occurring at Fox Cove in 2020 which caused the coast path to be moved back as the previous course of the path had collapsed.

Just south of Trethias Island are three Promontory forts formed by earthworks designed to defend the individual points between the coves. These forts and the land around are Scheduled monuments.

On 12 May 1969, an empty tanker bound for breaking, the Hemsley I, was wrecked in Fox Cove after the master mistook his location. The vessel was broken up on site.
