= Booby's Bay =

Beach in Cornwall, England

Coordinates: 50.5392°N 5.0268°W

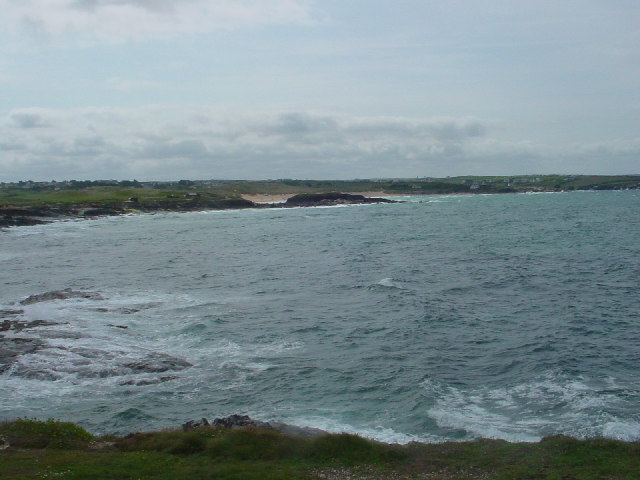
Booby's Bay

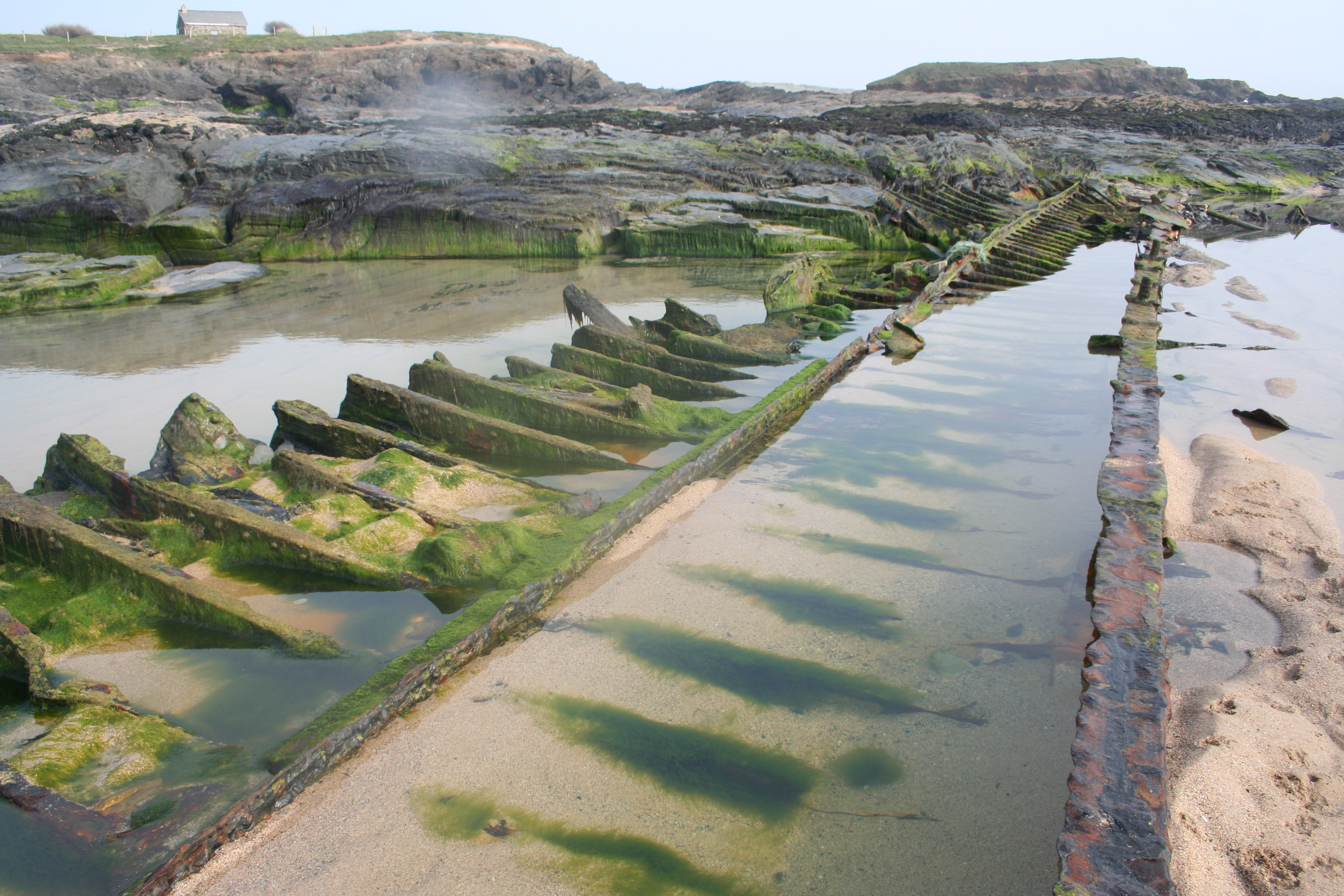
The wreck of the SV Carl

Booby's Bay is a sandy beach near Padstow, Cornwall, England, UK. During World War I, the three masted sailing ship Carl of the German navy was beached and abandoned in Constantine Bay while being towed to London during a storm.
