= List of United Kingdom locations: Stap-St N =

The United Kingdom

This is part of the list of United Kingdom locations: a gazetteer of place names in the United Kingdom showing each place's locality and geographical coordinates.

== Sta (continued) ==
=== Stap ===
Location	Locality	Coordinates (links to map & photo sources)	OS grid reference
Stape	North Yorkshire	54.32°N 00.78°W	SE7993
Stapehill	Dorset	50.79°N 01.93°W	SU0500
Stapeley	Cheshire	53.03°N 02.49°W	SJ6749
Stapenhill	Staffordshire	52.78°N 01.63°W	SK2521
Staple	Kent	51.25°N 01.25°E	TR2756
Staplecross	East Sussex	50.97°N 00.53°E	TQ7822
Staple Cross	Devon	50.97°N 03.38°W	ST0320
Staplefield	West Sussex	51.03°N 00.18°W	TQ2728
Staple Fitzpaine	Somerset	50.95°N 03.05°W	ST2618
Stapleford	Cambridgeshire	52.13°N 00.14°E	TL4751
Stapleford	Hertfordshire	51.82°N 00.10°W	TL3116
Stapleford	Leicestershire	52.75°N 00.80°W	SK8118
Stapleford	Lincolnshire	53.10°N 00.68°W	SK8857
Stapleford	Nottinghamshire	52.92°N 01.25°W	SK5037
Stapleford	Wiltshire	51.13°N 01.90°W	SU0737
Stapleford Abbotts	Essex	51.63°N 00.16°E	TQ5095
Stapleford Tawney	Essex	51.66°N 00.16°E	TQ5099
Staplegrove	Somerset	51.02°N 03.12°W	ST2126
Staplehay	Somerset	50.98°N 03.12°W	ST2121
Staple Hill	South Gloucestershire	51.48°N 02.50°W	ST6576
Staple Hill	Worcestershire	52.35°N 02.04°W	SO9773
Staplehurst	Kent	51.15°N 00.54°E	TQ7843
Staple Lawns	Somerset	50.95°N 03.06°W	ST2518
Staplers	Isle of Wight	50.69°N 01.27°W	SZ5189
Staples Hill	West Sussex	51.03°N 00.57°W	TQ0027
Staplestreet	Kent	51.30°N 00.93°E	TR0560
Stapleton	City of Bristol	51.47°N 02.56°W	ST6175
Stapleton	Cumbria	55.03°N 02.78°W	NY5071
Stapleton	Herefordshire	52.27°N 02.99°W	SO3265
Stapleton	Leicestershire	52.57°N 01.36°W	SP4398
Stapleton (Selby)	North Yorkshire	53.66°N 01.22°W	SE5119
Stapleton (Stapleton-on-Tees)	North Yorkshire	54.50°N 01.59°W	NZ2612
Stapleton	Shropshire	52.63°N 02.79°W	SJ4604
Stapleton	Somerset	50.98°N 02.77°W	ST4621
Stapley	Somerset	50.91°N 03.16°W	ST1813
Staploe	Bedfordshire	52.22°N 00.33°W	TL1460
Staplow	Herefordshire	52.06°N 02.45°W	SO6941

=== Star-Stay ===
Location	Locality	Coordinates (links to map & photo sources)	OS grid reference
Star	Fife	56.21°N 03.11°W	NO3103
Star	Pembrokeshire	51.97°N 04.56°W	SN2434
Starbeck	North Yorkshire	53.99°N 01.51°W	SE3256
Starbotton	North Yorkshire	54.16°N 02.07°W	SD9574
Starcross	Devon	50.61°N 03.45°W	SX9781
Stareton	Warwickshire	52.33°N 01.51°W	SP3371
Stargate	Gateshead	54.96°N 01.75°W	NZ1663
Star Hill	Monmouthshire	51.71°N 02.76°W	SO4702
Starkholmes	Derbyshire	53.11°N 01.55°W	SK3058
Starling	Bury	53.58°N 02.34°W	SD7710
Starling's Green	Hertfordshire	51.95°N 00.10°E	TL4531
Starr's Green	East Sussex	50.90°N 00.48°E	TQ7515
Starston	Norfolk	52.40°N 01.27°E	TM2384
Start	Devon	50.28°N 03.68°W	SX8044
Startforth	Durham	54.53°N 01.93°W	NZ0416
Start Hill	Essex	51.86°N 00.20°E	TL5221
Startley	Wiltshire	51.53°N 02.08°W	ST9482
Startop's End	Buckinghamshire	51.81°N 00.66°W	SP9214
Start Point	Devon	50.22°N 03.65°W	SX823372
Start Point	Orkney Islands	59.27°N 02.38°W	HY783436
St Arvans	Monmouthshire	51.66°N 02.70°W	ST5196
Starveall	South Gloucestershire	51.58°N 02.30°W	ST7987
Starvecrow	Kent	51.21°N 00.27°E	TQ5949
St Asaph (Llanelwy)	Denbighshire	53.25°N 03.45°W	SJ0374
Statenborough	Kent	51.24°N 01.30°E	TR3155
Statham	Cheshire	53.37°N 02.49°W	SJ6787
St Athan	The Vale Of Glamorgan	51.39°N 03.42°W	ST0167
Stathe	Somerset	51.04°N 02.90°W	ST3728
Stathern	Leicestershire	52.87°N 00.85°W	SK7731
Station Hill	Cumbria	54.83°N 03.16°W	NY2549
Station Town	Durham	54.71°N 01.38°W	NZ4036
Staughton Green	Cambridgeshire	52.27°N 00.34°W	TL1365
Staughton Highway	Cambridgeshire	52.26°N 00.34°W	TL1364
Staughton Moor	Cambridgeshire	52.23°N 00.34°W	TL1361
Staunton (near Coleford)	Gloucestershire	51.80°N 02.65°W	SO5512
Staunton (near Gloucester)	Gloucestershire	51.95°N 02.32°W	SO7829
Staunton in the Vale	Nottinghamshire	52.97°N 00.80°W	SK8043
Staunton on Arrow	Herefordshire	52.23°N 02.93°W	SO3660
Staunton on Wye	Herefordshire	52.09°N 02.93°W	SO3645
Staupes	North Yorkshire	54.00°N 01.66°W	SE2257
St Austell	Cornwall	50.33°N 04.78°W	SX0252
St Austins	Hampshire	50.77°N 01.56°W	SZ3197
Staveley	Cumbria	54.37°N 02.83°W	SD4698
Staveley	Derbyshire	53.26°N 01.35°W	SK4374
Staveley	North Yorkshire	54.05°N 01.45°W	SE3662
Staveley-in-Cartmel	Cumbria	54.26°N 02.96°W	SD3786
Staverton	Devon	50.46°N 03.70°W	SX7964
Staverton	Gloucestershire	51.90°N 02.16°W	SO8923
Staverton	Northamptonshire	52.24°N 01.22°W	SP5361
Staverton	Wiltshire	51.33°N 02.21°W	ST8560
Stawell	Somerset	51.13°N 02.91°W	ST3638
Stawley	Somerset	50.98°N 03.34°W	ST0622
Staxigoe	Highland	58.45°N 03.06°W	ND3852
Staxton	North Yorkshire	54.19°N 00.45°W	TA0179
Staylittle	Ceredigion	52.48°N 04.00°W	SN6489
Staylittle	Powys	52.51°N 03.65°W	SN8892
Staynall	Lancashire	53.87°N 02.97°W	SD3643
Staythorpe	Nottinghamshire	53.06°N 00.88°W	SK7553

== St B – St D ==
Location	Locality	Coordinates (links to map & photo sources)	OS grid reference
St Bees	Cumbria	54.48°N 03.59°W	NX9711
St Bees Head	Cumbria	54.51°N 03.63°W	NX942142
St Blazey	Cornwall	50.35°N 04.72°W	SX0654
St Blazey Gate	Cornwall	50.34°N 04.72°W	SX0653
St Boswells	Scottish Borders	55.56°N 02.65°W	NT5930
St Breock	Cornwall	50.50°N 04.86°W	SW9771
St Breward	Cornwall	50.55°N 04.69°W	SX0976
St Briavels	Gloucestershire	51.73°N 02.63°W	SO5604
St Briavels Common	Gloucestershire	51.71°N 02.66°W	SO5402
St Brides	Pembrokeshire	51.74°N 05.20°W	SM7910
St Brides Major	The Vale Of Glamorgan	51.45°N 03.59°W	SS8974
St Bride's-super-Ely	The Vale Of Glamorgan	51.48°N 03.31°W	ST0977
St Brides Wentlooge	City of Newport	51.53°N 03.02°W	ST2982
St Budeaux	Devon	50.40°N 04.19°W	SX4458
St Buryan	Cornwall	50.06°N 05.63°W	SW4025
St Catherine	Bath and North East Somerset	51.42°N 02.33°W	ST7770
St Catherines	Argyll and Bute	56.21°N 05.03°W	NN1207
St Catherine's Hill	Dorset	50.75°N 01.80°W	SZ1495
St Catherine's Hill	Hampshire	51.045°N 01.308°W	SU484276
St Catherine's Point	Isle of Wight	50.57°N 01.29°W	SZ497752
St Chloe	Gloucestershire	51.70°N 02.23°W	SO8401
St Clears	Carmarthenshire	51.81°N 04.51°W	SN2716
St Cleer	Cornwall	50.48°N 04.48°W	SX2468
St Clement	Cornwall	50.24°N 05.01°W	SW8543
St Clether	Cornwall	50.62°N 04.54°W	SX2084
St Colmac	Argyll and Bute	55.85°N 05.13°W	NS0467
St Columb Major	Cornwall	50.42°N 04.94°W	SW9163
St Columb Minor	Cornwall	50.41°N 05.04°W	SW8462
St Columb Road	Cornwall	50.39°N 04.94°W	SW9159
St Combs	Aberdeenshire	57.65°N 01.91°W	NK0563
St Cross	Hampshire	51.04°N 01.33°W	SU4727
St Cross South Elmham	Suffolk	52.40°N 01.36°E	TM2984
St Cyrus	Aberdeenshire	56.76°N 02.42°W	NO7464
St Davids (Tyddewi)	Pembrokeshire	51.87°N 05.27°W	SM7525
St David's	Perth and Kinross	56.36°N 03.71°W	NN9420
St David's Head	Pembrokeshire	51.90°N 05.29°W	SM733281
St Day	Cornwall	50.23°N 05.18°W	SW7342
St Decumans	Somerset	51.16°N 03.34°W	ST0642
St Dennis	Cornwall	50.37°N 04.88°W	SW9557
St Denys	City of Southampton	50.91°N 01.38°W	SU4313
St Dials	Torfaen	51.64°N 03.04°W	ST2894
St Dogmaels	Ceredigion	52.07°N 04.68°W	SN1645
St Dominic	Cornwall	50.48°N 04.25°W	SX4067
St Donat's	The Vale Of Glamorgan	51.40°N 03.53°W	SS9368
St Dympna's	Devon	50.71°N 03.07°W	SY2491

== Ste ==
Location	Locality	Coordinates (links to map & photo sources)	OS grid reference
Stead	Bradford	53.91°N 01.78°W	SE1446
Steam Mills	Gloucestershire	51.83°N 02.52°W	SO6415
Stean	North Yorkshire	54.15°N 01.87°W	SE0873
Steanbow	Somerset	51.14°N 02.61°W	ST5739
Stearsby	North Yorkshire	54.13°N 01.06°W	SE6171
Steart (Babcary)	Somerset	51.04°N 02.62°W	ST5627
Steart (Otterhampton)	Somerset	51.19°N 03.04°W	ST2745
Stebbing	Essex	51.89°N 00.41°E	TL6624
Stebbing Green	Essex	51.88°N 00.43°E	TL6823
Stechford	Birmingham	52.48°N 01.82°W	SP1287
Stede Quarter	Kent	51.11°N 00.67°E	TQ8738
Stedham	West Sussex	50.99°N 00.77°W	SU8622
Steel (Birtley)	Northumberland	55.13°N 02.17°W	NY8982
Steel (Hexhamshire)	Northumberland	54.91°N 02.11°W	NY9358
Steel Bank	Sheffield	53.37°N 01.50°W	SK3387
Steel Cross	East Sussex	51.05°N 00.16°E	TQ5231
Steelend	Fife	56.11°N 03.54°W	NT0492
Steele Road	Scottish Borders	55.22°N 02.75°W	NY5293
Steeleroad-end	Scottish Borders	55.22°N 02.74°W	NY5393
Steel Green	Cumbria	54.19°N 03.28°W	SD1678
Steel Heath	Shropshire	52.91°N 02.68°W	SJ5436
Steen's Bridge	Herefordshire	52.20°N 02.67°W	SO5457
Steep	Hampshire	51.01°N 00.94°W	SU7425
Steephill	Isle of Wight	50.59°N 01.22°W	SZ5577
Steep Holm	North West Somerset	51.33°N 03.10°W	ST230603
Steep Lane	Calderdale	53.70°N 01.97°W	SE0223
Steeple	Dorset	50.62°N 02.12°W	SY9181
Steeple	Essex	51.68°N 00.79°E	TL9302
Steeple Ashton	Wiltshire	51.30°N 02.14°W	ST9056
Steeple Aston	Oxfordshire	51.92°N 01.31°W	SP4725
Steeple Barton	Oxfordshire	51.92°N 01.36°W	SP4425
Steeple Bumpstead	Essex	52.04°N 00.44°E	TL6841
Steeple Claydon	Buckinghamshire	51.92°N 00.99°W	SP6926
Steeple Gidding	Cambridgeshire	52.41°N 00.33°W	TL1381
Steeple Langford	Wiltshire	51.13°N 01.95°W	SU0337
Steeple Morden	Cambridgeshire	52.06°N 00.13°W	TL2842
Steep Marsh	Hampshire	51.02°N 00.93°W	SU7526
Steeraway	Shropshire	52.67°N 02.51°W	SJ6509
Steeton	Bradford	53.89°N 01.95°W	SE0344
Steinis	Western Isles	58.21°N 06.36°W	NB4433
Steisay	Western Isles	57.37°N 07.23°W	NF854442
Stella	Gateshead	54.96°N 01.73°W	NZ1763
Stelling Minnis	Kent	51.17°N 01.06°E	TR1446
Stelvio	City of Newport	51.57°N 03.02°W	ST2987
Stembridge	Somerset	50.97°N 02.82°W	ST4220
Stembridge	Swansea	51.59°N 04.22°W	SS4691
Stenalees	Cornwall	50.37°N 04.80°W	SX0157
Stencoose	Cornwall	50.26°N 05.21°W	SW7145
St Endellion	Cornwall	50.56°N 04.83°W	SW9978
Stenhill	Devon	50.88°N 03.35°W	ST0510
Stenhouse	Dumfries and Galloway	55.21°N 03.88°W	NX8093
Stenhouse	City of Edinburgh	55.92°N 03.26°W	NT2171
Stenhousemuir	Falkirk	56.02°N 03.81°W	NS8783
Stenigot	Lincolnshire	53.31°N 00.12°W	TF2581
Stennack	Cornwall	50.18°N 05.29°W	SW6537
St Enoder	Cornwall	50.36°N 04.96°W	SW8956
Stenscholl	Highland	57.63°N 06.22°W	NG4868
Stenson	Derbyshire	52.85°N 01.52°W	SK3229
Stenswall	Shetland Islands	60.25°N 01.29°W	HU3952
Stenton	East Lothian	55.95°N 02.61°W	NT6274
Stenton	Fife	56.16°N 03.17°W	NT2798
Stentwood	Devon	50.87°N 03.23°W	ST1309
Stenwith	Lincolnshire	52.91°N 00.76°W	SK8336
Steornabhagh	Western Isles	58.20°N 06.39°W	NB4232
Stepaside	Cornwall	50.26°N 04.87°W	SW9545
Stepaside	Pembrokeshire	51.73°N 04.70°W	SN1307
Stepaside	Powys	52.49°N 03.35°W	SO0889
Stepney	Kingston upon Hull	53.757°N 0.358°W	TA083302
Stepney	Tower Hamlets	51.51°N 00.07°W	TQ3481
Stepping Hill	Stockport	53.38°N 02.13°W	SJ9187
Steppingley	Bedfordshire	52.00°N 00.52°W	TL0135
Stepps	North Lanarkshire	55.88°N 04.16°W	NS6568
St Erme	Cornwall	50.30°N 05.03°W	SW8449
Sterndale Moor	Derbyshire	53.20°N 01.85°W	SK1068
St Erney	Cornwall	50.40°N 04.29°W	SX3759
Sternfield	Suffolk	52.19°N 01.49°E	TM3961
Stert	Wiltshire	51.33°N 01.97°W	SU0259
Sterte	Poole	50.71°N 02.00°W	SZ0091
St Erth	Cornwall	50.16°N 05.43°W	SW5535
St Erth Praze	Cornwall	50.16°N 05.40°W	SW5735
St Ervan	Cornwall	50.49°N 04.97°W	SW8970
Stetchworth	Cambridgeshire	52.19°N 00.39°E	TL6458
St Eval	Cornwall	50.47°N 04.98°W	SW8868
Stevenage	Hertfordshire	51.90°N 00.19°W	TL2424
Steven's Crouch	East Sussex	50.90°N 00.43°E	TQ7115
Stevenston	North Ayrshire	55.64°N 04.76°W	NS2642
Stevenstone	Devon	50.95°N 04.10°W	SS5219
Steventon	Hampshire	51.21°N 01.22°W	SU5447
Steventon	Oxfordshire	51.61°N 01.33°W	SU4691
Steventon	Shropshire	52.35°N 02.70°W	SO5273
Steventon End	Essex	52.05°N 00.31°E	TL5942
Stevington	Bedfordshire	52.16°N 00.56°W	SP9853
Stewards	Essex	51.74°N 00.09°E	TL4507
Steward's Green	Essex	51.68°N 00.11°E	TL4600
Stewartby	Bedfordshire	52.06°N 00.51°W	TL0242
Stewarton	Argyll and Bute	55.41°N 05.65°W	NR6919
Stewarton	East Ayrshire	55.68°N 04.51°W	NS4246
St Ewe	Cornwall	50.27°N 04.85°W	SW9746
Stewkley	Buckinghamshire	51.92°N 00.76°W	SP8526
Stewkley Dean	Buckinghamshire	51.92°N 00.79°W	SP8326
Stewley	Somerset	50.95°N 02.98°W	ST3118
Stewton	Lincolnshire	53.35°N 00.04°E	TF3686
Steyne Cross	Isle of Wight	50.67°N 01.09°W	SZ6487
Steyning	West Sussex	50.88°N 00.33°W	TQ1711
Steynton	Pembrokeshire	51.72°N 05.02°W	SM9107

== St F – St H ==
Location	Locality	Coordinates (links to map & photo sources)	OS grid reference
St Fagans	Cardiff	51.48°N 03.26°W	ST1277
St Fergus	Aberdeenshire	57.55°N 01.85°W	NK0952
St Fillans	Perth and Kinross	56.39°N 04.12°W	NN6924
St Florence	Pembrokeshire	51.67°N 04.77°W	SN0801
St Gennys	Cornwall	50.74°N 04.63°W	SX1497
St George	City of Bristol	51.45°N 02.54°W	ST6273
St George	Conwy	53.26°N 03.54°W	SH9775
St George in the East	Southwark	51.50°N 00.07°W	TQ3480
St Georges	North Somerset	51.35°N 02.90°W	ST3762
St George's	Shropshire	52.68°N 02.44°W	SJ7010
St George's	The Vale Of Glamorgan	51.47°N 03.31°W	ST0976
St George's	Trafford	53.46°N 02.27°W	SJ8297
St George's Hill	Surrey	51.34°N 00.46°W	TQ0762
St George's Well	Devon	50.86°N 03.39°W	ST0208
St Germans	Cornwall	50.38°N 04.32°W	SX3557
St Giles	Camden	51.51°N 00.12°W	TQ3081
St Giles	Lincolnshire	53.23°N 00.53°W	SK9872
St Giles in the Wood	Devon	50.94°N 04.09°W	SS5318
St Giles on the Heath	Devon	50.68°N 04.32°W	SX3690
St Giles's Hill	Hampshire	51.05°N 01.30°W	SU4929
St Gluvias	Cornwall	50.16°N 05.11°W	SW7834
St Godwalds	Worcestershire	52.31°N 02.04°W	SO9769
St Govan's Head	Pembrokeshire	51.60°N 04.93°W	SR970932
St Harmon	Powys	52.33°N 03.49°W	SN9872
St Helena	Warwickshire	52.60°N 01.61°W	SK2601
St Helen Auckland	Durham	54.63°N 01.72°W	NZ1827
St Helens	Cumbria	54.67°N 03.53°W	NY0132
St Helens	East Sussex	50.87°N 00.58°E	TQ8212
St Helens	Isle of Wight	50.69°N 01.12°W	SZ6289
St Helens	St Helens	53.44°N 02.75°W	SJ5095
St Helen's	Barnsley	53.56°N 01.45°W	SE3608
St Helen's	Isles of Scilly	49.97°N 06.32°W	SV899170
St Helen's Wood	East Sussex	50.87°N 00.57°E	TQ8111
St Helier	Sutton	51.37°N 00.17°W	TQ2766
St Hilary	Cornwall	50.12°N 05.42°W	SW5531
St Hilary	The Vale Of Glamorgan	51.44°N 03.42°W	ST0173

== Sti – St J ==
Location	Locality	Coordinates (links to map & photo sources)	OS grid reference
Stibb	Cornwall	50.86°N 04.53°W	SS2210
Stibbard	Norfolk	52.81°N 00.93°E	TF9828
Stibb Cross	Devon	50.90°N 04.24°W	SS4214
Stibb Green	Wiltshire	51.35°N 01.68°W	SU2262
Stibbington	Cambridgeshire	52.56°N 00.40°W	TL0898
St Ibbs	Hertfordshire	51.92°N 00.27°W	TL1926
Stichill	Scottish Borders	55.63°N 02.46°W	NT7138
Sticker	Cornwall	50.31°N 04.85°W	SW9750
Stickford	Lincolnshire	53.11°N 00.01°E	TF3559
Stick Hill	Kent	51.16°N 00.08°E	TQ4643
Sticklepath (Barnstaple, North Devon)	Devon	51.06°N 04.07°W	SS5532
Sticklepath (West Devon)	Devon	50.72°N 03.94°W	SX6394
Sticklepath (West Somerset)	Somerset	51.11°N 03.37°W	ST0436
Sticklepath (South Somerset)	Somerset	50.90°N 02.99°W	ST3012
Sticklinch	Somerset	51.13°N 02.63°W	ST5638
Stickling Green	Essex	51.96°N 00.13°E	TL4732
Stickney	Lincolnshire	53.08°N 00.00°E	TF3456
Stiff Street	Kent	51.31°N 00.68°E	TQ8761
Stileway	Somerset	51.16°N 02.77°W	ST4641
Stillingfleet	North Yorkshire	53.85°N 01.10°W	SE5940
Stillington	Darlington	54.60°N 01.42°W	NZ3723
Stillington	North Yorkshire	54.09°N 01.11°W	SE5867
St Illtyd	Blaenau Gwent	51.692°N 03.083°W	SO2101
Stilton	Cambridgeshire	52.48°N 00.29°W	TL1689
Stinchcombe	Gloucestershire	51.68°N 02.39°W	ST7398
Stinsford	Dorset	50.71°N 02.41°W	SY7191
Stiperstones	Shropshire	52.59°N 02.94°W	SJ3600
St Ippolyts	Hertfordshire	51.92°N 00.27°W	TL1927
Stirchley	Birmingham	52.42°N 01.92°W	SP0581
Stirchley	Shropshire	52.65°N 02.44°W	SJ7006
Stirling	Aberdeenshire	57.46°N 01.80°W	NK1242
Stirling	Stirling	56.11°N 03.94°W	NS7993
Stirtloe	Cambridgeshire	52.27°N 00.25°W	TL1966
Stirton	North Yorkshire	53.96°N 02.04°W	SD9752
St Ishmael's	Pembrokeshire	51.71°N 05.14°W	SM8307
St Issey	Cornwall	50.50°N 04.93°W	SW9271
Stisted	Essex	51.88°N 00.61°E	TL8024
Stitchcombe	Wiltshire	51.41°N 01.68°W	SU2269
Stitchin's Hill	Worcestershire	52.15°N 02.36°W	SO7551
Stithians	Cornwall	50.18°N 05.18°W	SW7336
St Ive	Cornwall	50.47°N 04.39°W	SX3067
St Ive Cross	Cornwall	50.47°N 04.38°W	SX3167
St Ives	Cambridgeshire	52.33°N 00.09°W	TL3072
St Ives	Cornwall	50.20°N 05.49°W	SW5140
St Ives	Dorset	50.83°N 01.83°W	SU1204
Stivichall	Coventry	52.38°N 01.51°W	SP3376
Stixwould	Lincolnshire	53.16°N 00.25°W	TF1765
St James	Dorset	50.99°N 02.20°W	ST8622
St James	Norfolk	52.73°N 01.36°E	TG2720
St James's	City of Westminster	51.50°N 00.14°W	TQ2980
St James' End	Northamptonshire	52.23°N 00.91°W	SP7460
St James South Elmham	Suffolk	52.37°N 01.40°E	TM3281
St Jidgey	Cornwall	50.48°N 04.90°W	SW9469
St John	Cornwall	50.35°N 04.25°W	SX4053
St Johns	Lewisham	51.46°N 00.02°W	TQ3776
St Johns	Warwickshire	52.32°N 01.59°W	SP2870
St John's	East Sussex	51.05°N 00.13°E	TQ5031
St John's	Isle of Man	54.19°N 04.65°W	SC2781
St John's (Southborough)	Kent	51.14°N 00.25°E	TQ5841
St John's (Sevenoaks)	Kent	51.28°N 00.17°E	TQ5256
St John's	Leeds	53.82°N 01.34°W	SE4337
St John's	Surrey	51.30°N 00.59°W	SU9857
St John's	Worcestershire	52.18°N 02.25°W	SO8354
St John's Chapel	Devon	51.04°N 04.09°W	SS5329
St John's Chapel	Durham	54.73°N 02.18°W	NY8838
St John's Fen End	Norfolk	52.67°N 00.26°E	TF5311
St John's Head	Orkney Islands	58.91°N 03.40°W	HY192043
St John's Highway	Norfolk	52.70°N 00.24°E	TF5214
St John's Park	Isle of Wight	50.72°N 01.15°W	SZ6092
St John's Point	Highland	58.65°N 03.19°W	ND308749
St John's Town of Dalry	Dumfries and Galloway	55.10°N 04.16°W	NX6281
St John's Wood	City of Westminster	51.53°N 00.18°W	TQ2683
St Judes	Isle of Man	54.33°N 04.47°W	SC3996
St Julians	Hertfordshire	51.73°N 00.35°W	TL1405
St Julians	City of Newport	51.59°N 02.98°W	ST3289
St Just in Penwith	Cornwall	50.12°N 05.69°W	SW3631
St Just in Roseland	Cornwall	50.17°N 05.01°W	SW8535

== St K – St N ==
Location	Locality	Coordinates (links to map & photo sources)	OS grid reference
St Katharines	Wiltshire	51.37°N 01.64°W	SU2564
St Katherines	Aberdeenshire	57.39°N 02.36°W	NJ7834
St Keverne	Cornwall	50.04°N 05.08°W	SW7921
St Kew	Cornwall	50.55°N 04.79°W	SX0276
St Kew Highway	Cornwall	50.54°N 04.78°W	SX0375
St Keyne	Cornwall	50.41°N 04.47°W	SX2460
St Kilda (Hirta)	Western Isles	57.81°N 08.58°W	NF094995
St Lawrence	Cornwall	50.46°N 04.76°W	SX0466
St Lawrence	Essex	51.70°N 00.83°E	TL9604
St Lawrence	Isle of Wight	50.58°N 01.25°W	SZ5376
St Lawrence	Kent	51.33°N 01.38°E	TR3665
St Leonards	Buckinghamshire	51.75°N 00.68°W	SP9107
St Leonards	Dorset	50.82°N 01.84°W	SU1103
St Leonards (St Leonards-on-Sea)	East Sussex	50.85°N 00.54°E	TQ7909
St Leonards	South Lanarkshire	55.76°N 04.15°W	NS6554
St Leonard's Street	Kent	51.27°N 00.39°E	TQ6756
St Levan	Cornwall	50.04°N 05.66°W	SW3822
St Luke's	City of Derby	52.91°N 01.51°W	SK3335
St Luke's	Islington	51.52°N 00.09°W	TQ3282
St Lythans	Vale of Glamorgan	51.44°N 03.29°W	ST1072
St Mabyn	Cornwall	50.52°N 04.76°W	SX0473
St Madoes	Perth and Kinross	56.36°N 03.31°W	NO1920
St Margarets	Herefordshire	51.99°N 02.94°W	SO3533
St Margarets (Stanstead St Margarets)	Hertfordshire	51.78°N 00.00°E	TL3811
St Margarets	Richmond Upon Thames	51.45°N 00.31°W	TQ1774
St Margaret's at Cliffe	Kent	51.14°N 01.37°E	TR3644
St Margaret's Hope	Orkney Islands	58.82°N 02.97°W	ND4493
St Margaret South Elmham	Suffolk	52.39°N 01.39°E	TM3183
St Mark's	Gloucestershire	51.89°N 02.11°W	SO9222
St Mark's	Isle of Man	54.13°N 04.61°W	SC2974
St Martin	Cornwall	50.36°N 04.44°W	SX2655
St Martin (St Martin-in-Meneage)	Cornwall	50.06°N 05.17°W	SW7323
St Martin's	Isles of Scilly	49.96°N 06.27°W	SV934157
St Martin's	Shropshire	52.91°N 03.01°W	SJ3236
St Martins	Perth and Kinross	56.45°N 03.38°W	NO1530
St Martin's Moor	Shropshire	52.90°N 03.02°W	SJ3135
St Mary Bourne	Hampshire	51.24°N 01.39°W	SU4250
St Marychurch	Devon	50.48°N 03.52°W	SX9266
St Mary Church	The Vale Of Glamorgan	51.42°N 03.43°W	ST0071
St Mary Cray	Bromley	51.38°N 00.09°E	TQ4667
St Mary Hill	The Vale Of Glamorgan	51.49°N 03.49°W	SS9678
St Mary Hoo	Kent	51.45°N 00.58°E	TQ8076
St Mary in the Marsh	Kent	51.00°N 00.93°E	TR0627
St Mary's	Isles of Scilly	49.92°N 06.29°W	SV917113
St Mary's	Orkney Islands	58.89°N 02.92°W	HY4701
St Mary's Bay	Kent	51.00°N 00.96°E	TR0827
St Mary's Isle	Dumfries and Galloway	54.82°N 04.06°W	NX672493
St Maughans	Monmouthshire	51.84°N 02.78°W	SO4617
St Maughans Green	Monmouthshire	51.84°N 02.77°W	SO4717
St Mawes	Cornwall	50.15°N 05.02°W	SW8433
St Mawgan	Cornwall	50.44°N 05.00°W	SW8765
St Mellion	Cornwall	50.46°N 04.28°W	SX3865
St Mellons	Cardiff	51.52°N 03.11°W	ST2381
St Merryn	Cornwall	50.51°N 04.99°W	SW8873
St Mewan	Cornwall	50.32°N 04.82°W	SW9951
St Michael Caerhays	Cornwall	50.24°N 04.86°W	SW9642
St Michael Church	Somerset	51.06°N 03.00°W	ST3030
St Michaels	Devon	50.42°N 03.57°W	SX8860
St Michaels	Kent	51.08°N 00.68°E	TQ8835
St Michaels	Worcestershire	52.28°N 02.61°W	SO5865
St Michael's Hamlet	Liverpool	53.36°N 02.96°W	SJ3686
St Michael's on Wyre	Lancashire	53.86°N 02.82°W	SD4641
St Michael South Elmham	Suffolk	52.39°N 01.43°E	TM3483
St Michael Penkivel	Cornwall	50.23°N 05.01°W	SW8542
St Minver	Cornwall	50.55°N 04.88°W	SW9677
St Monans	Fife	56.19°N 02.77°W	NO5201
St Neot	Cornwall	50.47°N 04.56°W	SX1867
St Neots	Cambridgeshire	52.22°N 00.27°W	TL1860
St Newlyn East	Cornwall	50.36°N 05.06°W	SW8256
St Nicholas	Hertfordshire	51.91°N 00.18°W	TL2526
St Nicholas	Pembrokeshire	51.97°N 05.05°W	SM9035
St Nicholas	The Vale Of Glamorgan	51.45°N 03.31°W	ST0974
St Nicholas at Wade	Kent	51.34°N 01.24°E	TR2666
St Nicholas South Elmham	Suffolk	52.38°N 01.40°E	TM3282
St Nicolas Park	Warwickshire	52.53°N 01.45°W	SP3793
St Ninians	Stirling	56.09°N 03.94°W	NS7991
St Ninian's Isle	Shetland Islands	59.97°N 01.35°W	HU363208
