= Stiff =

Stiff may refer to or describe:

== Science and technology ==
- Stiffness, a material's resistance to bending
- Joint stiffness, pain and/or reduced range of motion of body parts in humans and animals
- Stiff diagram, in hydrogeology and geochemistry, a way of displaying water chemistry data
- Stiff equation, in computational differential calculus
- Stiff fluid or stiff matter, modeled by the Zeldovich equation of state
- Stiff nut, a type of fastener

== People ==
- Stiff Johnson, a producer of G. Love and Special Sauce (album), Libido (Buck-O-Nine album), "Demagogue" (song), and Yeah, It's That Easy
- Stiff Leadbetter (c. 1705 – 1766), British architect and builder
- Carol Stiff, American women's basketball executive
- David Stiff (born 1984), English cricketer
- David Stiff (basketball) (born 1972), Australian basketball player
- Denise Stiff, American manager of contemporary musicians
- George Stiff (1807–1873), English engraver and newspaper proprietor
- Harry Stiff (1881–1939), English tug of war competitor and landowner
- Hugh Stiff (1916–1995), Canadian Anglican bishop
- James Stiff (1808–1897), English potter
- Jimmy Stiff (1911–1937), Australian athlete
- Jimmy Stiff, former member of American rock band Jackyl
- Lee Stiff (1949–2021), American mathematics education researcher
- Linda E. Stiff, 2007–2008 acting United States Commissioner of Internal Revenue
- Matthew Stiff (born 1979), English singer and radio presenter
- Patrick J. Stiff (born 1950), American bone marrow transplant doctor
- Peter Stiff (1933–2016), London-born South African author
- Robert Stiff (born 1960), Southern-Rhodesia-born British entrepreneur

== Arts and media ==
=== Music ===
- Stiff (album), a 2016 album by White Denim
- Stiff Records, a British record label

=== Literature, film, and television ===
- Stiff: The Curious Lives of Human Cadavers, a 2003 nonfiction book by Mary Roach
- Stiff (novel), a 1994 novel by Shane Maloney in The Murray Whelan Series
  - Stiff, a 2004 Australian television movie adaptation of it
- Seattle's True Independent Film Festival, an annual event 2005–2019
- "Stiff" (Gimme Gimme Gimme), a 2000 television episode

== Other uses ==
- Stiff, slang for a human corpse
- Stiff (professional wrestling), how a wrestler attacks an opponent
- Bindlestiff, hobo who carries a bindle
- Stiff Street, a hamlet in Kent, England
