= Bender =

Bender may refer to: a Surname (of German and English descent) or meaning to go on a binge.

== Slang ==
- Drinking binge
- Curveball, a type of pitch thrown in baseball
- Bender, a male homosexual, in British derogatory slang
- Sixpence (British coin), in archaic British slang

== Fictional characters ==
- Bender (Futurama), a robot from the animated television series Futurama
- Bender, one who can manipulate a classical element in the Avatar: The Last Airbender franchise
- Elaine Bender, detective from the television series Blue Murder
- Goodloe Bender, from the movie The Road to Wellville
- John Bender (character), from the 1985 film The Breakfast Club played by Judd Nelson
- Ostap Bender, a con man in novels by Soviet authors Ilya Ilf and Yevgeni Petrov
- Bender (TV series), a 1979 TV series produced by Terry Becker

== Places ==
- Bender, Moldova, a city
- Bender, Georgia, United States, a ghost town

== Music ==
- Bender (band), an American hard rock band
- Bender (rapper) (1980–2018), Canadian rapper
- Ariel Bender, pseudonym of British rock guitarist Luther Grosvenor

== Other uses ==
- Bender (surname)
- FC Dinamo Bender, Moldovan football club based in Bender
- Bender tent, a type of makeshift shelter made using bended tree branches
- Pipe and tube bender, a machine which bends tube, pipe and solid metals
- Bloody Benders, a family of serial killers operating in Kansas in the 19th century.
- BENDER, the name of the YouTube channel of Benjamin Buit

== See also ==
- B-Bender, a guitar accessory that allows the player to change the pitch of one or more strings "on the fly"
- Bend (disambiguation)
- Benders (disambiguation)
- Bending (disambiguation)
- Bendor (disambiguation)
