= Articulation =

Articulation may refer to:

== Linguistics ==
- Articulatory phonetics, the study of how humans produce speech sounds via the interaction of physiological structures
  - Manner of articulation, how speech organs involved in making a sound make contact
  - Place of articulation, positions of speech organs to create distinctive speech sounds
- Articulatory gestures, the actions necessary to enunciate language
- Articulatory phonology, a theory that attempts to unify phonetics and phonology
- Articulatory speech recognition, the recovery of speech from acoustic signals
- Articulatory synthesis, computational techniques for synthesizing speech based on models of human articulation processes
- Topic–focus articulation, a field of study concerned with marking old and new information in a clause

== Engineering ==
- Articulated vehicle, which have a pivoted joint allowing them to turn more sharply
- Articulation score, in telecommunications, a subjective measure of the intelligibility of a voice system
- Axle articulation, a vehicle's ability to flex its suspension, measured by ramp travel index

== Other uses ==
- Articulation (anatomy), the location at which two or more bones make contact
- Articulation (architecture), in art and architecture, is a method of styling the joints in the formal elements of architectural design
- Articulation (botany), a joint between two separable parts, as a leaf and a stem; see Glossary of botanical terms
- Articulation (dentistry), the contact relationship of the occlusal surfaces of the upper and lower teeth when moving into and away from centric occlusion
- Articulation (education), the process of comparing the content of courses that are transferred between K - 12 as well as postsecondary institutions
- Articulation (music), the transition or continuity between multiple notes or sounds
- Articulation (sociology), the process by which particular classes appropriate cultural forms and practices for their own use
- Articulation point, in graph theory, shared vertices of a biconnected component
- Articulatory suppression, a process of inhibiting memory by requiring an individual to repeat an irrelevant speech sound
- Articulatory technique, a type of Osteopathic Manipulative Treatment
- Articulation (painting), a painting by Euan Uglow

== See also ==
- Articulate (disambiguation)
- Bendable (disambiguation)
