= Benders (disambiguation) =

The Benders were a Sydney jazz band.

Benders may also refer to:

- Bloody Benders, 1870s family of Kansas serial killers
- Benders (TV series), a 2015 American television series
- Benders decomposition in mathematical programming

People with the surname Benders:

- Jacques F. Benders (1924–2017), Dutch mathematician
- Johan Benders (1907–1943), Dutch teacher
- M. H. Benders (born 1971), Dutch poet

== See also ==
- Bend (disambiguation)
- Bender (disambiguation)
