= Spencer technique =

The Spencer technique (also known as the "7 stages of Spencer") is an articulatory technique used in Osteopathic medicine to help relieve restriction and pain at the shoulder. Although variations exist, normally 7 steps are included. Indications for the Spencer technique include adhesive capsulitis.

The following is a common sequence:

- Glenohumeral extension
  - Use slow gentle springing motion at the point of resistance and muscle energy.
- Glenohumeral flexion
- Circumduction with compression
- Circumduction with traction
- Abduction of the shoulder joint
- Internal Rotation
- Joint Pump

== See also ==
Atlas of Osteopathic Techniques, Alexander Nicholas DO FAAO
