= Robert Stiff =

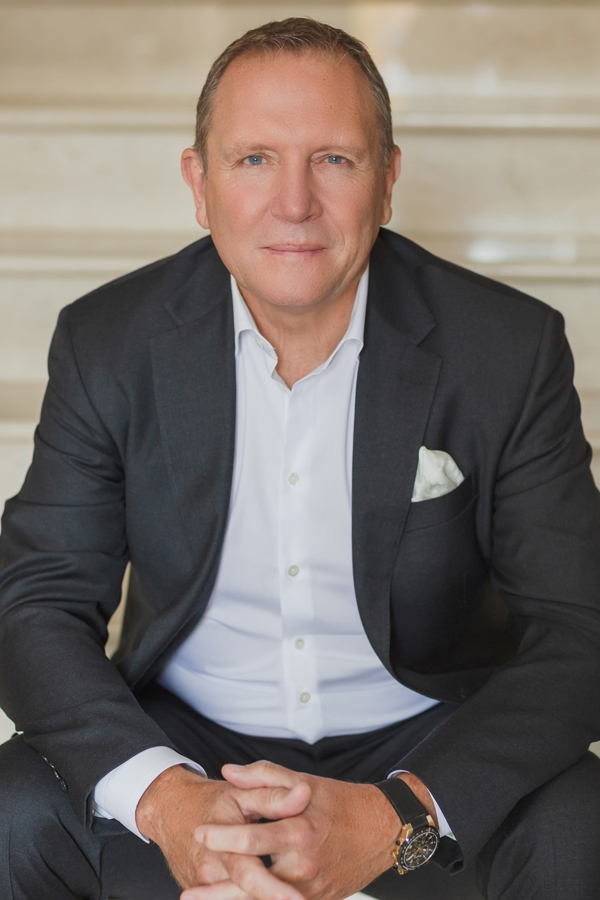
- Born: 24 June 1960 (age 66); Southern Rhodesia
- Occupations: Businessman; entrepreneur
- Known for: Mentoring to business owners, motivational speaking
- Spouse: Catherine Stiff
- Children: Marc Stiff, Katie Stiff, Chloe Stiff

Robert Stiff (born 24 June 1960) is a Southern Rhodesia born British entrepreneur.

== Early life ==
Robert Stiff was born in Southern Rhodesia (now Zimbabwe) in 1960, where he was brought up by his English parents – Peter Stiff and Marion Hewson. His father Peter Stiff, an officer in the British South Africa Police until 1972, is the author of The Rain Goddess. The novel draws on Peter's experiences of counter-insurgency along the Rhodesian–South African border during the 1960s and early 1970s.

Robert is one of four children with Timothy Stiff being his older brother and sisters, Sally Jalette-Joy and Penny Streeter OBE

== Career 1987 - 2005 ==
Robert Stiff moved to Great Britain in 1978 and enlisted in the British Army. After leaving the army, Stiff joined Prudential Assurance in 1987, working as a senior manager for 12 years before moving into healthcare recruitment.

He joined healthcare recruitment company Ambition Recruitment Services as Sales Director in 1999, working with Penny Streeter. During his six years at the company, Stiff was instrumental in increasing his sales team's turnover from £3m to £75m per annum.

== Career 2011 - 2015 ==
In 2005 Stiff started the company Team24 and in May 2011 sold it to one of Britain's largest outsourcing firms, Capita. Stiff agreed to stay on as managing director of the firm until his departure in May 2012. The firm was the winner of Fast Growth Business Awards, Family Business of the Year. Also, listed 16th in 2009 by The Sunday Times Fast Track and 15th in 2010.

Stiff is a regular motivational key note speaker on a variety of topics, including: recruitment; management; sales; motivation; margins; the Internet; and e-commerce.

In 2012 Robert launched Hankyz – the ultimate men's accessory. With collections of pre-folded pocket squares/ Hankies in the world.

In 2013 he won Entrepreneur of the Year at the Insider South East Dealmakers Awards.

== Career 2015 - Present ==
Since 2015 Robert has worked on a number of new projects, including starting a number of new businesses. All of the companies are headlining under The Galago Group

- Quicktemp - A Nationwide Recruitment Specialist providing Temporary & Permanent recruitment solutions in the driving, office and education sectors.
- Daksta – working across a number of technical areas including Oil and Gas, engineering, shipping and construction.
- Nursdoc - In June 2015 Robert went back to his roots and launched Nursdoc – A healthcare recruitment agency working across the UK, that provides temporary, contract and permanent nurse & doctors.
- Nursing Direct – In 2017 Robert launched Nursing Direct, it deals with patients with Complex health needs in their homes, in partnership with CCGs as well as direct private engagement.
- Edgewater – In 2019 Robert and his team launched Edgewater, a security recruitment company that provides temporary, contract and permanent positions.
- Lemur Care - Childrens Homes specialising in ages 12 –17

In December 2019 Northern Recruitment Group (NRG) and Greenbean RPO was acquired by Galago Group. NRG is a staffing business that specialises in executive search and selection and Greenbean is a Recruitment Process Outsourcing model.
