= Leonardslee =

Country house and garden in Lower Beeding, West Sussex, UK

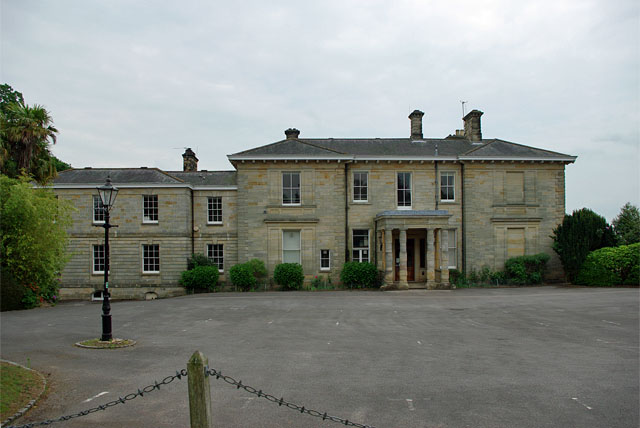
- Leonardslee House

- Location within West Sussex
- 51°01′11″N 0°15′36″W
- Type: Country house
- Location: Lower Beeding
- OS grid reference: TQ 22171 25905

Site notes
- Area: West Sussex
- Architectural style: Italianate
- Owner: Benguela Collection Hospitality Group

Listed Building – Grade II
- Official name: Leonardslee
- Designated: 19 January 1973
- Reference no.: Historic England – National Heritage List for England (1027010)

National Register of Historic Parks and Gardens
- Official name: Leonardslee
- Designated: 1 June 1984
- Reference no.: Historic England – National Heritage List for England (1000159)

Leonardslee is an English country house and English landscape garden and woodland garden in Lower Beeding, near Horsham, West Sussex, England. The Grade I listed garden is particularly significant for its spring displays of rhododendrons, azaleas, camellias, magnolias and bluebells, with the flowering season reaching its peak in May. The estate includes a 19th-century Italianate style house and lodge as well as an intact Pulhamite rockery.

== History ==
The name Leonardslee derives from the lea or valley of St Leonard's Forest, one of the ancient forests of the High Weald. In the Middle Ages the soil was too acidic for agriculture and so it remained as a natural woodland with wild animals and deer for the chase. There was extensive felling of the forest trees in the 16th and 17th centuries when the Weald became the centre of England's iron industry, producing cannon and cannonballs, firebacks, hinges, horseshoes and nails. The local sandstone was rich in iron and the ore was dug from surface pits. A wood to the south of Leonardslee is still called Minepit Wood and its surface is pockmarked with ancient ore diggings.

Most of the forest trees were felled for charcoal, which was used to reduce the ore and to generate heat to smelt it. The valley streams were dammed to provide a head of water that powered, via a water wheel, bellows that blasted air into the furnace, which was called Gosden furnace. Such a furnace would typically operate non-stop day and night and so it required a great deal of water to keep it going. A string of ponds was therefore created through a series of dams in the long, steep-sided valley to act as reservoirs; these would be drained as necessary to keep the flow of water going over the wheel. With the demise of the Wealden iron industry in the 17th century Gosden furnace was silenced, leaving behind the ponds, which later became a picturesque feature of the gardens, and allowing the woodlands to regenerate.

King Charles II granted the lands of St Leonard's Forest to his physician, Sir Edward Greaves, and from him they were passed down to the Aldridge family.

=== Manor House ===
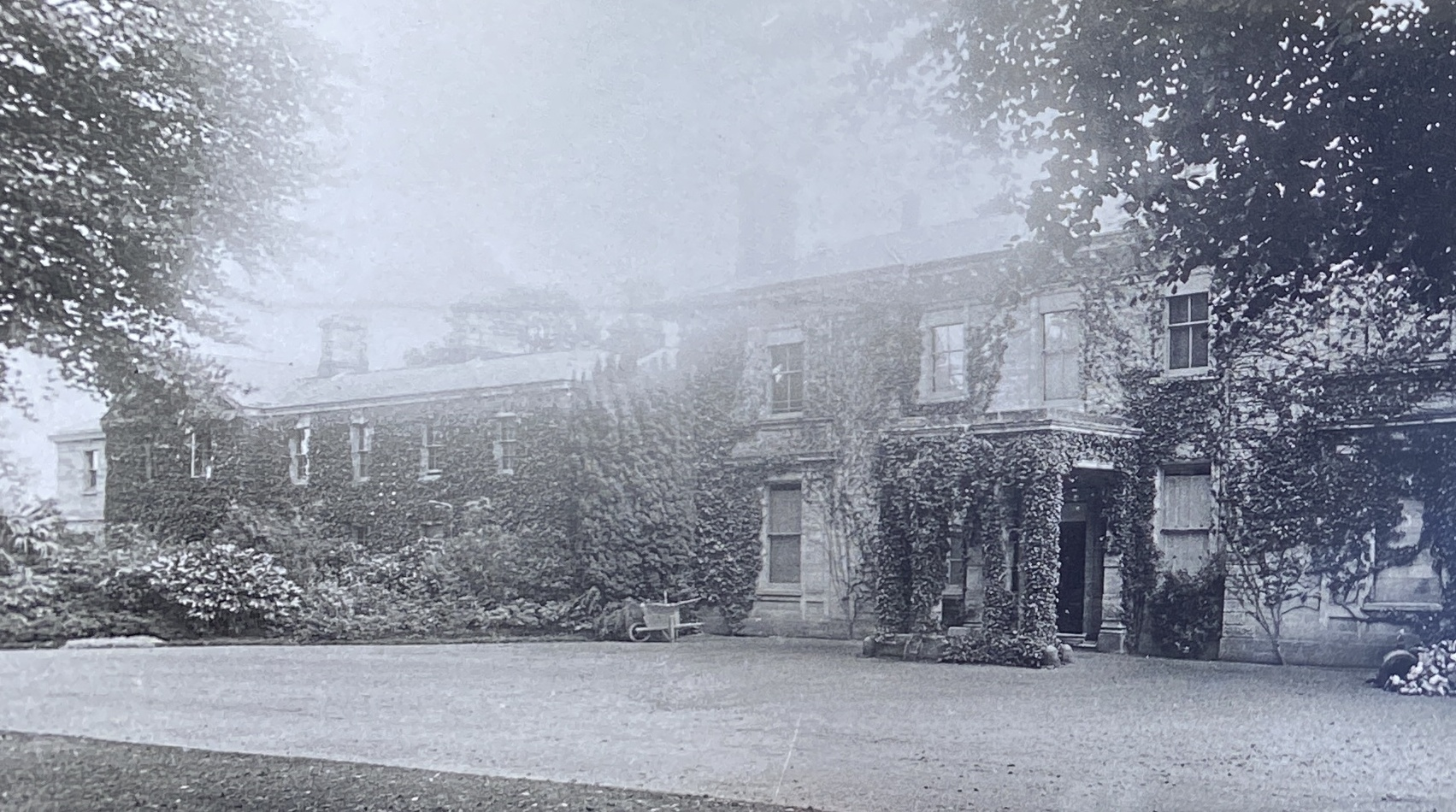
Leonardslee in the 19th century

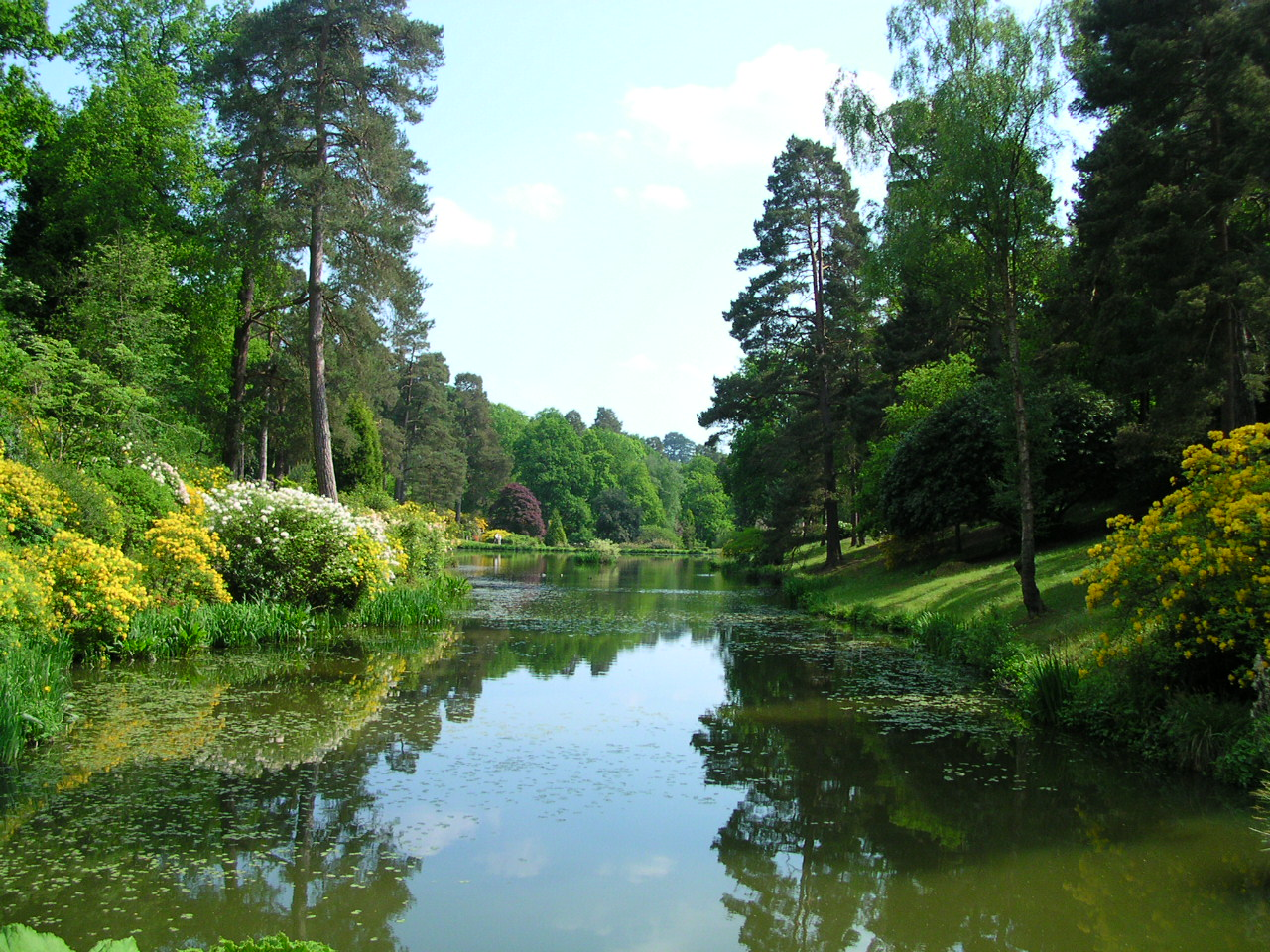
One of the lakes

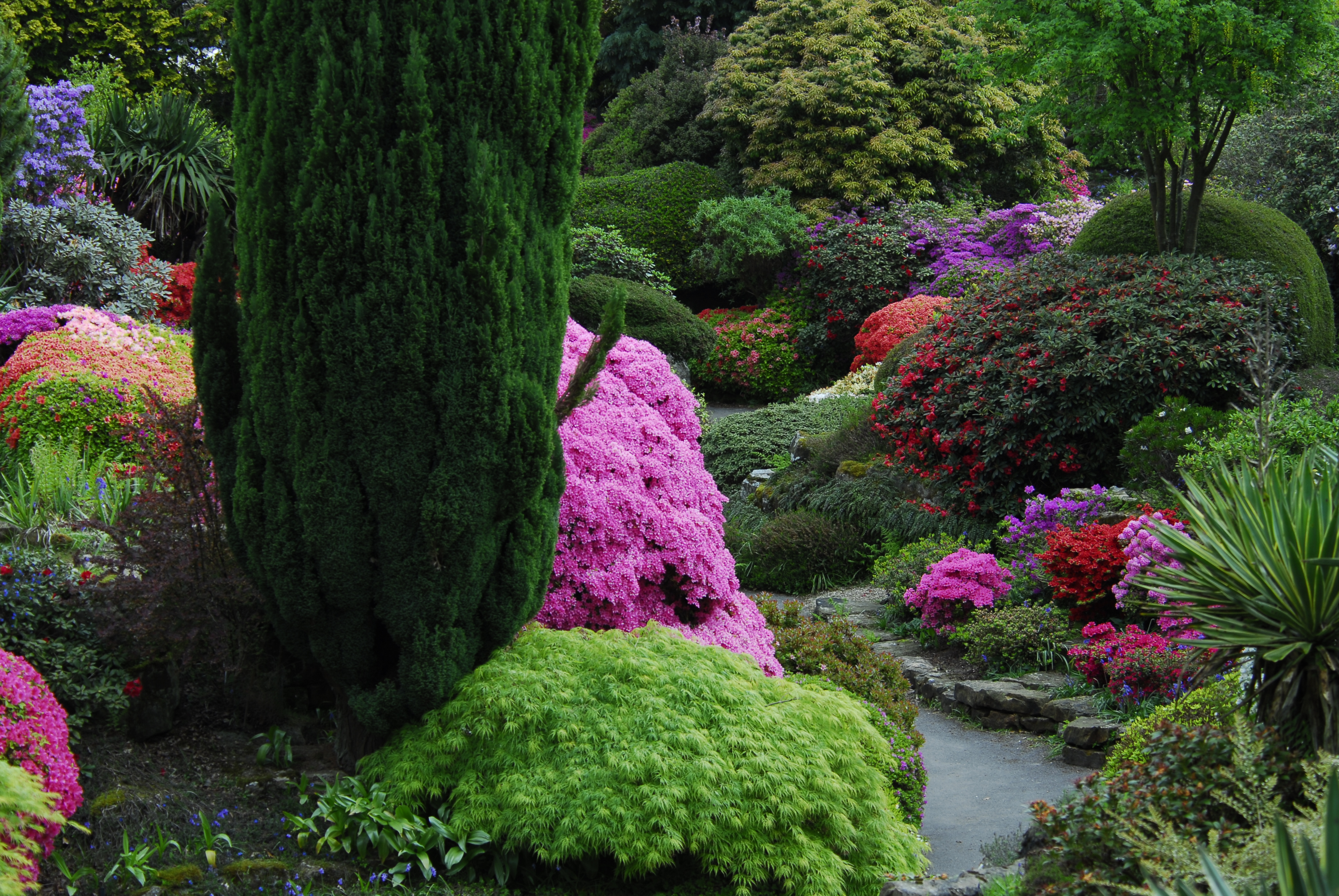
The Rock Garden

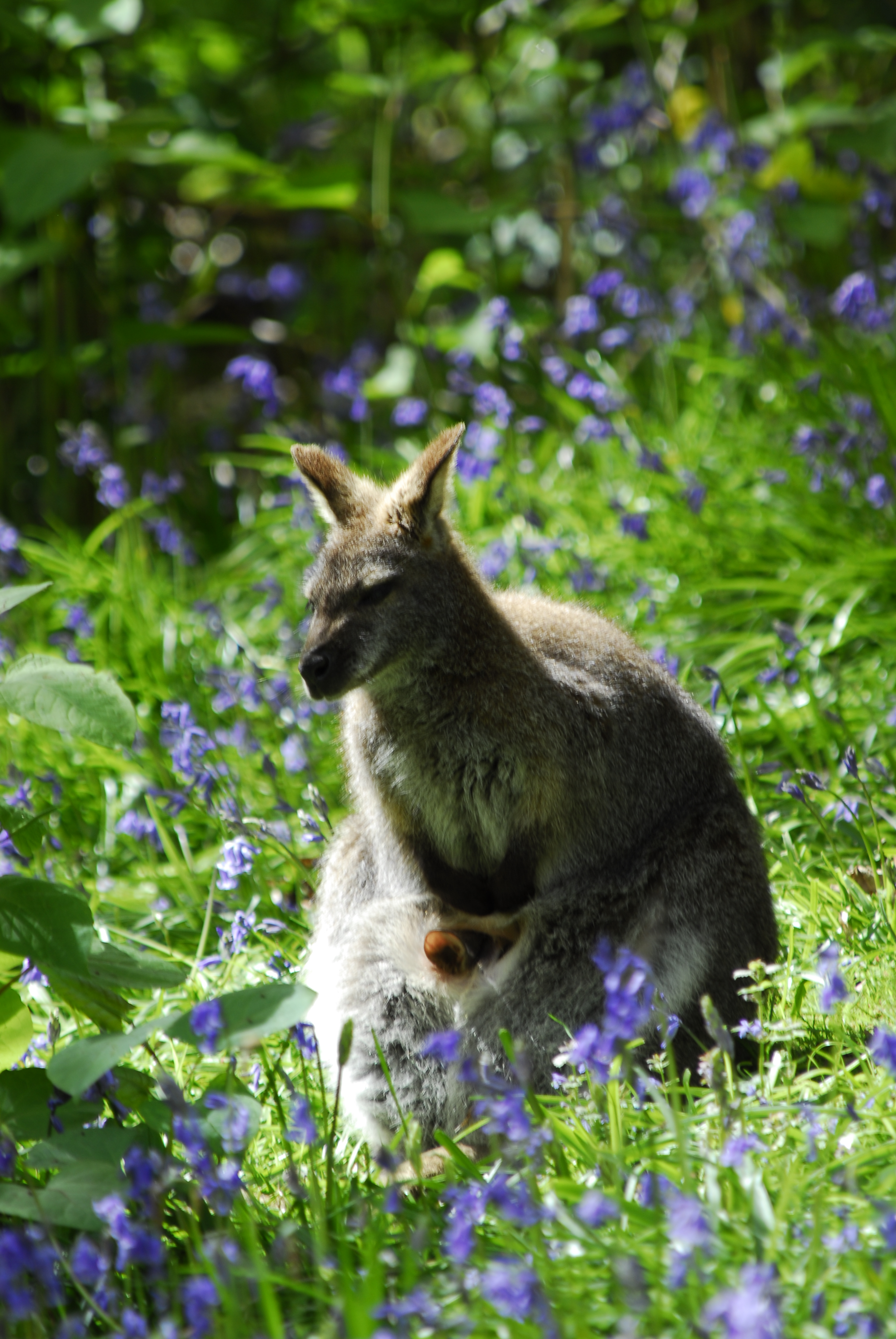
Wallabies

A portion of the Aldridge estate was sold in 1801 to Charles George Beauclerk, who erected a house called St Leonard's Lodge on the site of the present mansion. The Beauclerk family were responsible for the first ornamental plantings at Leonardslee. By the early 1800s the denudations of the iron works had been replaced by more than a century of natural regeneration. The estate was now lightly wooded, mainly with oak, beech and chestnut, with some ancient pines and larch plantations, and in which there were a series of seven man-made ponds, some of which once provided power for the Wealden iron industry. The gardens were established in 1801 and covered 200 acres (81 hectares) in a steep sandstone valley. Charles Beauclerk included an American garden with conifers, palms and giant sequoia Sequoiadendron giganteum as well as planting the first camellias, rhododendrons and magnolias that suited the acidic soil.

In 1852 the estate was sold to the Hubbard family, specifically William Hubbard, who commissioned the present Italianate style house, completed in 1855, designed by Thomas Leverton Donaldson, the first Professor of Architecture at University College London.

Victorian plant collector Sir Edmund Loder purchased the estate from his parents-in-law in 1889 and planted extensive collections of rhododendrons and azaleas and many species of trees. Loder became interested in plant hybridisation and developed new rhodendron varieties, the Loderi hybrids. He planted a large amount of exotic flora in a short time and also introduced gazelle, beavers, kangaroos and wallabies.

A rock garden near the house was built c.1890 by the Victorian landscaping company James Pulham and Son, who also built a mound, using a mixture of natural and artificial cretaceous sandstone, containing artificial caves for mouflon, later used to shelter wallabies. It was planted initially with ferns and alpines organised by Loder. The Pulhamite rockery is among the most intact remaining in the UK in the twentyfirst century.

Parts of the gardens were used for filming several exterior scenes of the 1947 film Black Narcissus, which is set in the extreme north of India.

In 1973 the main house, built in 19th-century Italianate style, and in 1980 a contemporary octagonal lodge to its north-west, were listed Grade II for their architectural merit. The garden is listed Grade I on the Register of Historic Parks and Gardens.

The last Loder to own Leonardslee, Robin Loder, made four new lakes and new plantings on the east side of the valley. In February 2010 it was announced that estate had been sold by the Loder family to an international businessman and that, after the 2010 April to June season, the gardens would be closed to the public. The gardens closed on 30 June 2010.

== Current operations ==
The house and gardens were acquired in July 2017 by the Benguela Collection Hospitality Group, owned by the South African-based entrepreneur Penny Streeter. A plan was developed to provide restoration and maintenance over a decade. Overgrown trees were removed and lakes, glasshouses, infrastructure and buildings repaired, and the estate reopened to the public in April 2019. Sparkling wines have produced since 2024.

The Benguela Collection Hospitality Group is also the owner of Mannings Heath Golf Club & Wine Estate in Horsham, 3 miles (5 km) away.

== List of owners ==
- Sir Edward Greaves, 1st Baronet
- (1680) Aldrige Family
- (1801) Charles George Beauclerk
- (1845) William Egerton Hubbard
- (1883) Sir Edmund Giles Loder, 2nd Baronet
- (1920) Sir Giles Rolls Loder, 3rd Baronet
- (1983) Robert (Robin) Reginald Loder
- (2006) Thomas and Mary Loder
- (2010) Private business owner
- (2017–present) Penny Streeter/Benguela Collection Hospitality Group
