= Inflexible =

Inflexible may refer to:

- Stiffness, the rigidity of an object, the extent to which it resists deformation in response to an applied force
- Beardmore Inflexible, a British three-engined all-metal prototype bomber aircraft of the 1920s
- HMS Inflexible, one of several Royal Navy ships of this name
- Inflexible-class ship of the line built for the Royal Navy in the late 16th century
- French submarine Inflexible (S615), a French nuclear submarine
- LMS Jubilee Class 5727 Inflexible, a steam locomotive constructed in 1936.
- ST Inflexible, a French tugboat

== See also ==
- Flexibility (disambiguation)
