= Flex =

Flex or FLEX may refer to:

== Computing ==
- Apache Flex, formerly Adobe Flex, technologies for developing rich internet applications
- Flex (language), developed by Alan Kay
- FLEX (operating system), a single-tasking operating system for the Motorola 6800
- FlexOS, an operating system developed by Digital Research
- FLEX (protocol), a communication protocol for pagers
- FLEx, a piece of software used in language documentation
- Flex (lexical analyser generator), a lexical analyser generator and a free software alternative to lex
- Flex machine, a computer developed by RSRE in the 1980s
- CSS Flexible Box Layout, commonly known as Flexbox, a CSS 3 web layout model

== Science and technology ==
- Bending, also known as flexure, as used in mechanics
- Flexion, in anatomy, a position made possible by the joint angle decreasing
- Femtosecond Lenticule EXtraction, a form of refractive eye surgery
- Flex circuit, a flexible printed circuit used in electronic assemblies
- FLEX mission, a future satellite launch mission by the European Space Agency
- Astrolab FLEX rover, a robotic lunar rover.
- Flex temp, a reduced takeoff thrust setting which trades excess performance for reduced engine wear
- Flex-fuel, a flexible-fuel vehicle
- Inflection point, of a curve in geometry
- Power cord, or flex, a flexible electrical cable

== Music ==
=== Artists ===
- Flex (singer), Félix Danilo Gómez (born 1974)
- Funkmaster Flex (born 1968), American DJ and music producer

=== Albums and EPs ===
- Flex (album), by Lene Lovich, 1979
- Flex (EP), by Pitch Black, 2003

=== Songs ===
- "Flex" (Dizzee Rascal song), 2007
- "Flex" (Mad Cobra song), 1992
- "Flex" (Polo G song), 2020
- "Flex", by TFN, 2021
- "Flex", by Shygirl and Bambii from Club Shy Room 2, 2025
- "Flex (Ooh, Ooh, Ooh)", by Rich Homie Quan, 2015
- "FLEX" by Cupid, 2023

=== Other uses in music ===
- Flex, a break in the recitation tone before the mediation in Gregorian chant
- A "flex" in a "flex bar", a technique used in battle rap

== Organizations ==
- Flex (club), a nightclub in Vienna, Austria
- Flex (company) (NASDAQ symbol: FLEX), a contract electronics maker based in Singapore previously known as Flextronics.
- Flex FM, a London-based radio station
- Flex-Elektrowerkzeuge, a German producer of power tools
- Flex Linhas Aéreas, a Brazilian regional airline

== People ==
- Flex Alexander, Mark Alexander Knox (b. 1970), an American actor and comedian
- Flex Wheeler (born 1965), American bodybuilder
- Walter Flex (1887–1917), German author

== Other uses ==
- Amazon Flex, a platform for gig workers performing deliveries for Amazon
- ChromeOS Flex, an operating system maintained by Google that is based on ChromeOS
- Flex (comics), a fictional superhero
- Flex (film), a commercial/short film by English director Chris Cunningham
- Flex (magazine), an American bodybuilding magazine
- Flex (TV program), a 2021 Philippine variety show
- FlexAccount, the main current account offered by Nationwide Building Society since 1985
- Flextime, a flexible working arrangement
- Fleet Landing Exercises, a series of landing exercises conducted by the Fleet Marine Force, a combined-United States Navy/Marine landing force
- Flex Your Rights, a civil-liberties non-profit based in Washington DC, US
- Ford Flex, a crossover SUV produced from 2009-2019
- Future Leaders Exchange, an American student exchange program for high school students from the former Soviet Union

== See also ==
- Bend (disambiguation)
- Flexible (disambiguation)
- Flexing (disambiguation)
