= Flexible =

Flexible may refer to:

== Science and technology ==
- Power cord, a flexible electrical cable.
  - Flexible cable, an Electrical cable as used on electrical appliances
- Flexible electronics
- Flexible response
- Flexible-fuel vehicle
- Flexible rake receiver
- Flexible AC transmission system
- Semi-flexible rod polymer
- Flexible algebra, in non-associative algebras, for example alternative algebras
- Flexible polyhedron
- Flexible single master operation

== Other uses ==
- "Flexible", a song by Depeche Mode
- Flexible mold
- Flextime, a variable work schedule
- Flexible spending account, a tax-advantaged savings account
- Flexible baton round, fired as a shotgun shell
- Flxible, originally the Flexible Sidecar Co.

== See also ==
- Flexibility (disambiguation)
- Bendable (disambiguation)
- Rollable (disambiguation)
- Flex (disambiguation)
