= The Bends =

The Bends, the bends or bends may refer to:

== Music ==
- The Bends (album), a 1995 studio album by Radiohead
- "The Bends" (song), a 1995 song by Radiohead
- "The Bends", a song by Mr. Bungle from the 1995 album Disco Volante
- "The Bends", a song by Earl Sweatshirt from the 2018 album Some Rap Songs
- "Bends", a song by Carly Rae Jepsen from her 2022 album The Loneliest Time

== Other uses ==
- The bends, or decompression sickness, a medical condition caused by dissolved gases
- Bends (film), a 2013 Hong Kong film

== See also ==
- Bend (disambiguation)
- Bending (disambiguation)
