= T. articulata =

T. articulata may refer to:

- Tamarix articulata, the farash, a moderate sized tree species
- Tetraclinis articulata, the sandarac or barbary thuja, an evergreen coniferous tree species endemic to the western Mediterranean region
- Tropidophora articulata, a land snail species

== See also ==
- Articulata (disambiguation)
