= Articulate =

Articulate may refer to:

- Articulate!, a board game in which players describe words from different categories
- Articulate brachiopods, brachiopods with toothed hinges and simple opening and closing muscles
- Articulate sound, to move the tongue, lips, or other speech organs in order to make speech sounds
- Articulated vehicle, a vehicle which has a pivoting joint in its construction
- Articulate (TV series), a public television series about creative artists

== See also ==
- Articulation (disambiguation)
- Articulata (disambiguation)
