= Victor V. Moshchalkov =

Belgian-Russian physicist

- Born: June 12, 1952 (age 74)
- Education: Lomonosov Moscow State University
- Known for: Superconductors; Nanomagnetism; Nanophotonics
- Scientific career
- Fields: Physics; Superconductors; Nanomagnetism; Nanophotonics
- Workplaces: KU Leuven; Lomonosov Moscow State University

Victor V. Moshchalkov (Russian: Виктор Васильевич Мощалков; born 12 June 1952) is a Belgian-Russian physicist. He is a professor Emeritus in the Department of Physics at the KU Leuven. He is noted for contributions to Type-1.5 superconductors, S-Fi-S Pi Josephson junction and scanning Hall probe microscopy. He has made notable contributions to the fields of nanostructured superconductors, nanophotonics and heavy fermions in solids.

== Education and Research ==
Victor V. Moshchalkov studied at the Kolmogorov Mathematical School, in Moscow (Russia), until 1969. He graduated in physics from Moscow State University, in 1975, where he was ranked first among 450 students in physics. He obtained his habilitation from the Moscow State University in 1985. From 1978 to 1991, he was Research Physicist, Assistant Professor, Professor and Head of the Laboratory of High Temperature Superconductivity, at Moscow State University. From 1986 to 1991, he was Visiting Professor at Toronto University, at TH Darmstadt, at Marburg University and at RWTH Aachen. In 1991, he joined KU Leuven university as a Visiting Professor. In 1993, he was promoted to full professor and since 2017, he is professor Emeritus.

Moshchalkov's research has been focused on: nanostructured superconductors, nanophotonics and heavy fermions in solids.

Moshchalkov was awarded a Fellowship of the American Physical Society "For important contributions to the study of vortex matter and nano-structured superconductors". Specifically, in nano-structured superconductors, he discovered the vortex Mott insulator-metal transition, symmetry-induced antivortices in equilateral triangles and squares and multiple sign reversals of the vortex ratchet effect. In superconductor/ferromagnet hybrids, the domain wall superconductivity was reported by him. A bound vortex-antivortex pair, generated by shielding currents around pinning center, has been directly imaged by scanning Hall microscopy. Optical properties of individual and coupled photonic nanostructures and Fano resonances formed in these structures have been investigated. He published an explanation of the anomalous properties of heavy fermion solids in terms of the formation of the giant Abrikosov-Suhl resonance at the Fermi level.

== Awards and recognition ==
- 2014-2018, Member of the European Research Council (ERC) Expert Panel PE3 (Condensed Matter Physics)
- 2014, Elected Foreign Member of the Norwegian Academy of Science and Letters
- 2007, Elected Fellow of the American Physical Society .
- 2009, Methusalem Research Fellow (until 2017)
- 2006, Finalist for the EU Descartes Research Prize
- 2005, Laureate of the Belgian Fond for Scientific Research (FWO) Dr. A. De Leeuw-Damry-Bourlart Prize for Exact Sciences
- 2000, ISI Thomson Scientific Award “Top Cited Paper in Flanders”
- 1988, Laureate of the USSR Ministry of High Education Scientific Prize
- 1985, Laureate of the USSR State Prize for Young Researchers

== Publications ==
Professor Moshchalkov authored and co-authored more than 1000 scientific papers. With an h-index of over 65, his work has generated over 22,000 citations.
