= Penny Streeter =

British businesswoman (born 1967)

Penny Streeter OBE
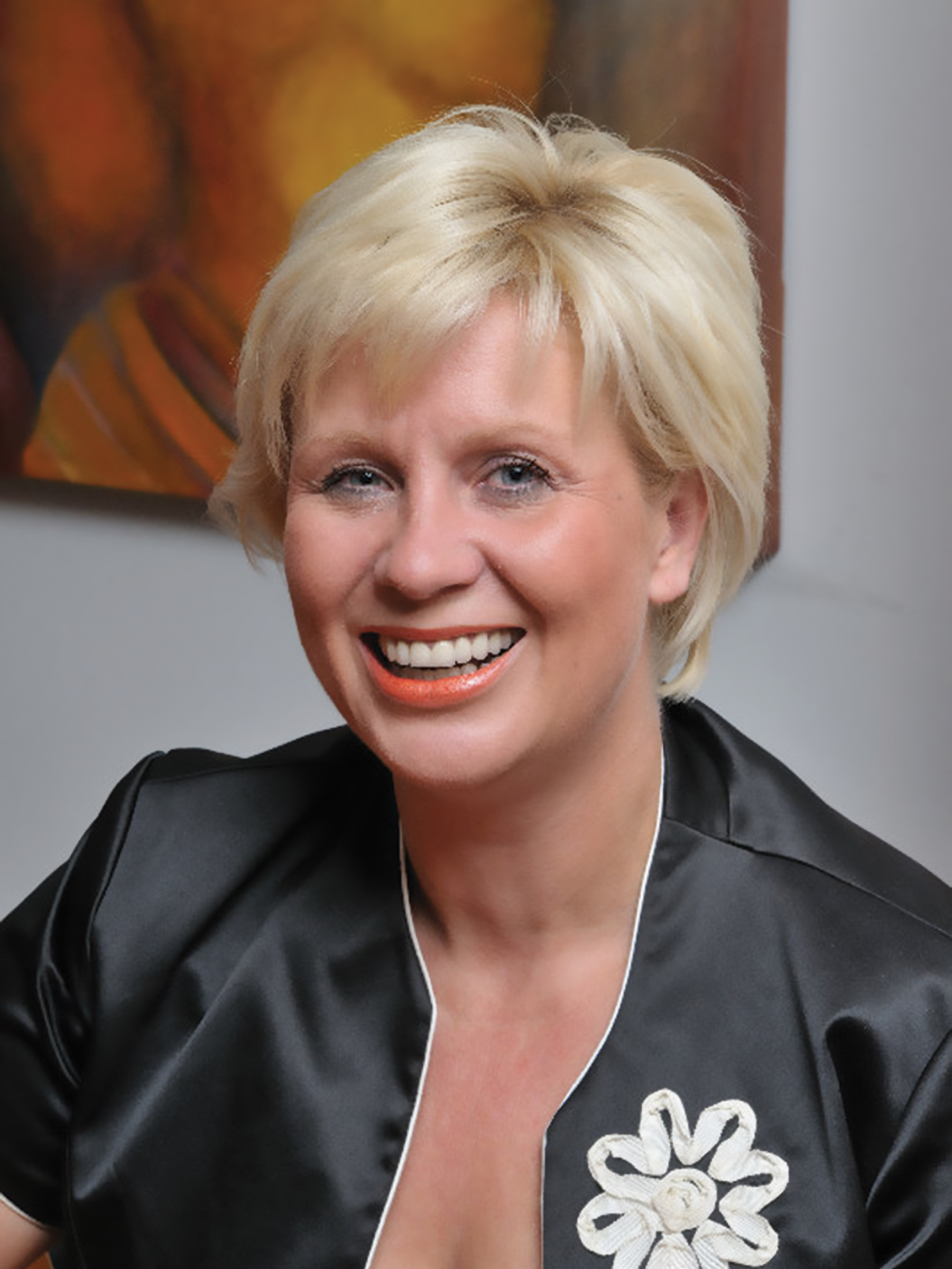
- Born: Penelope Marion Stiff; 1 August 1967 (age 58); Rhodesia (now Zimbabwe)
- Occupation: Businesswoman
- Known for: Female Entrepreneur
- Spouse(s): Nick Rea - m 2009 and Doug Streeter - divorced, 1995
- Children: Adam Streeter, Bonnie Streeter, Matilda Rea and Giselle Streeter
- Parent(s): Marion Hewson and Peter Stiff

Penny Streeter OBE (born 1 August 1967) is an English entrepreneur and founder of the A24 Group, comprising Ambition 24hours, Arabella Health Staffing and the NS Health Staffing. Penny Streeter established the medical staffing group in Sutton, England, in 1996, working with her mother Marion.

== Early life ==
Penny Streeter was born in Zimbabwe in 1967 to South African best-selling author Peter Stiff and Marion Hewson. Penny left Zimbabwe in 1979 and was educated at Alberton High in Johannesburg until 1983. She left South Africa for the UK at the age of 12 with her mother Marion. She started work in the recruitment sector through the Youth Training Scheme after leaving school at age 15.

== Career ==
In 1989 Penny Streeter launched her own recruitment business: it failed and she also divorced, which left her homeless and penniless, finding refuge in homeless accommodation with her three young children.

After some years working in other people's recruitment businesses, Streeter tried again in 1995 with a new venture, funded by evenings moonlighting as a children's party entertainer. Ambition 24hours, a nursing staffing agency, was launched in 1996. Following rapid growth, over the next decade, the company expanded the service to cover locum doctors, allied health professionals, carers, social workers and teachers/lecturers, and it opened other UK offices.

In 2013 Streeter purchased and is the developer of the Benguela Cove Lagoon Wine Estate, a wine farm and residential estate in South Africa, located on the lagoon at Walker Bay, Hermanus. Streeter purchased Mannings Heath Golf Club in West Sussex in 2016, buying out the majority share from the Exclusive Group. This was followed in 2017 by her acquisition of Leonardslee Gardens, also in West Sussex.

In October 2018 Streeter opened Restaurant Interlude at Leonardslee House, which won its first Michelin Star in August 2019 under chef Jean Delport, and then developed new hotel accommodation in October 2021.

== Personal life ==
Streeter currently lives in Cape Town, South Africa with her husband, Nick and other family members.

== Awards ==
- OBE (Order of the British Empire) 2006 New Years Honours for ‘services to enterprise’
- CBI (Confederation of British Industry) Entrepreneur of the Year, 2003
- 'Management Today' magazine, Top 100 Entrepreneurs: Top woman, and No. 13 overall for two years, 2003, 2004
- Fast Track 100 ‘Fastest Growing UK Companies’ 2004, 2003, 2002 - No.1 in 2002

== See also ==
- Confederation of British Industry
- Locum doctor
- Nursing agency
