= Flexibility =

Flexibility may refer to:

- Flexibility (anatomy), the distance of motion of a joint, which may be increased by stretching
- Flexibility (engineering), in the field of engineering systems design, designs that can adapt when external changes occur
- Flexibility (personality), the range of different appropriate behavioural responses a person can make in situations that they face.
- Cognitive flexibility, the ability to switch between thinking about two different concepts, and to think about multiple concepts simultaneously
- Labour market flexibility
- "Flexibility", a song by Miss Kittin & The Hacker first published as the seventh song of their 2001 album First Album
- Flexibility (abstract algebra), a property of some non-associative algebras
- Flexural rigidity, the resistance offered by a structure while undergoing bending

== See also ==
- Flexible (disambiguation)
- Stiff (disambiguation)
