= Mannings Heath, West Sussex =

Village in West Sussex, England

Coordinates: 51.04504°N 0.28317°W

Mannings Heath
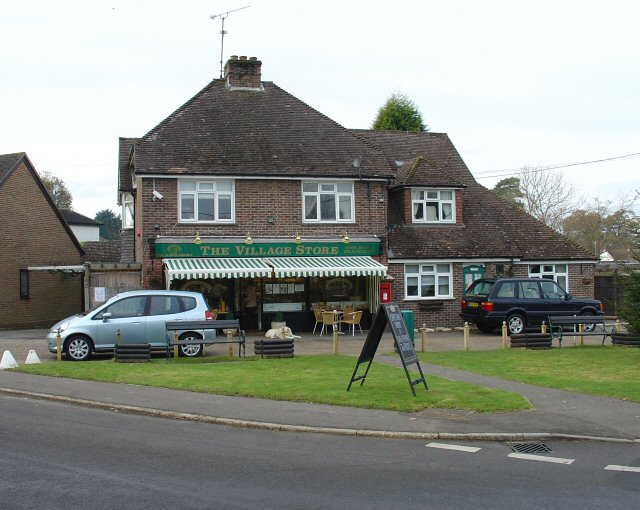
- Former Village Store

- Location within West Sussex
- OS grid reference: TQ204287
- Civil parish: Nuthurst
- District: Horsham
- Shire county: West Sussex
- Region: South East
- Country: England
- Sovereign state: United Kingdom
- Post town: HORSHAM
- Postcode district: RH13
- Dialling code: 01403
- Police: Sussex
- Fire: West Sussex
- Ambulance: South East Coast
- UK Parliament: Horsham

Mannings Heath is a village in the civil parish of Nuthurst and the Horsham District of West Sussex, England. The village is on the A281 road, 2 miles (3 km) south-east from the town of Horsham. Mannings Heath is the largest settlement in Nuthurst, and largely a dormitory for Horsham.

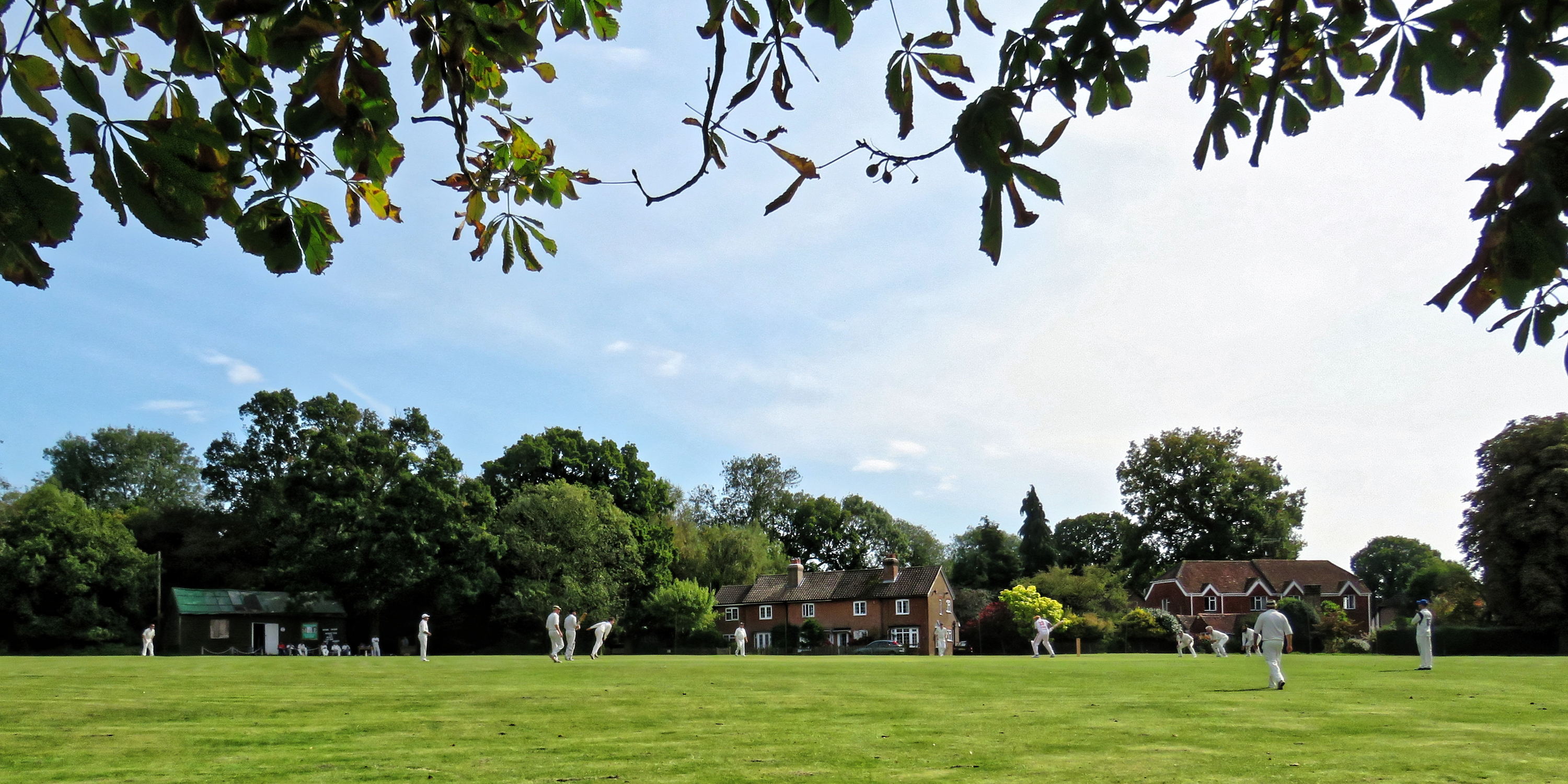
Cricket at Mannings Heath

Mannings Heath has an Anglican church dedicated to The Good Shepherd, built in 1881, a village hall, a village green incorporating Nuthurst Cricket Club's cricket ground, a riding school, and a golf course – Mannings Heath Golf Club, which is in both Nuthurst and the neighbouring parish of Lower Beeding.

The village, previously a hamlet set around two roads, with 20 houses in 1794 and 40 in 1841, experienced a period of council and private house expansion and infill after 1945. A History of the County of Sussex commented in 1987 that roads and houses had been "built with a variety of design that largely preserved the original character of the hamlet". The West Sussex Gazette reported that 350-400 houses had been built by 1979. Two buildings, possibly 17th century, and a small number dating to 18th century remain. The village pub, the Dun Horse Inn, closed several years ago.

== Notable people ==
Notable former inhabitants have included Norman Tebbit, Baron Tebbit of Chingford (a Cabinet minister in the Thatcher government), and the late television and film actor Peter Vaughan with his actress wife, Lilias Walker.
