= Bendor =

Bendor may refer to:

- Bendor Island, a French island in the Mediterranean Sea
- Bendor Range, a mountain range in British Columbia, Canada
- Bendor Grosvenor (born 1977), British art historian, writer and former art dealer
- Jan BenDor (born 1946), American women's rights activist

== See also ==
- Bender (disambiguation)
- Bend Or (1877–1903), a British Thoroughbred racehorse
- John Bendor-Samuel (1929-2011), British evangelical Christian missionary and linguist
