= Flexing =

Flexing may refer to:

- Flexion, the bending of a joint
- Flexing (dance), a street dance that originated in Brooklyn, New York
- Muscle contraction, activation of muscles causing shortening and bulging
- Slang term for bragging about having wealth, typically used in mumble rap

== See also ==
- Flex (disambiguation)
- Bending (disambiguation)
