= Bend =

Bend may refer to:

== Places ==
=== Canada ===
- Bend, British Columbia, a railway point

=== United States ===
- Bend, California
- Bend, Missouri
- Bend, Oregon
- Bend, South Dakota
- Bend, Texas

== Science, technology and engineering ==
- Bend (programming language)
- Bending, the deformation of an object due to an applied load
- Bend, a curvature in a pipe, tube, sheet, cable or hose; see Bend radius
- Bend (knot), a type of knot used to tie two ropes together

== Music ==
=== Techniques ===
- Bend (guitar), a guitar technique
- Note bending, a glide from one pitch to another

=== Albums and songs ===
- Bend (8stops7 album), 2006
- Bend (Alex Calder album), 2016
- Bend (The Origin album), 1992
- "Bend" (song), a 2015 song by Chet Faker

== People with the surname ==
- George H. Bend (1838–1900), American banker and financier
- Lin Bend (1922–1978), Canadian ice hockey player
- Robert Bend (1914–1999), Manitoba politician

== Other uses ==
- Bend (heraldry), a diagonal band used as a heraldic charge
- Curl (association football), a playing technique also called "bend"

== See also ==
- Bends (disambiguation)
- Bendy (disambiguation)
- Bendable (disambiguation)
- Bender (disambiguation)
- Bending (disambiguation)
