= Bending (disambiguation) =

Bending may refer to:

- Bending, the behavior of a structural element subjected to a lateral load
- Bending (metalworking), a sheet metalworking process used in manufacture
- Bending the rules
- Joanna Bending, British actress
- Simon J. Bending (born 1957), British physicist
- The middle name of fictional Futurama character Bender Bending Rodriguez
- Bending, the fictional ability of manipulation of the four classical elements in Avatar: The Last Airbender and its sequel, The Legend of Korra

== In music ==
- The flection of a tone, frequently utilized in blues and jazz music (see glissando)
- A harmonica technique used to change the pitch of a note.
- String bending, a guitar technique

== See also ==
- Bend (disambiguation)
- Flexing (disambiguation)
