= Stibb Cross =

Village in Devon, England

Coordinates: 50.9125°N 4.2367°W

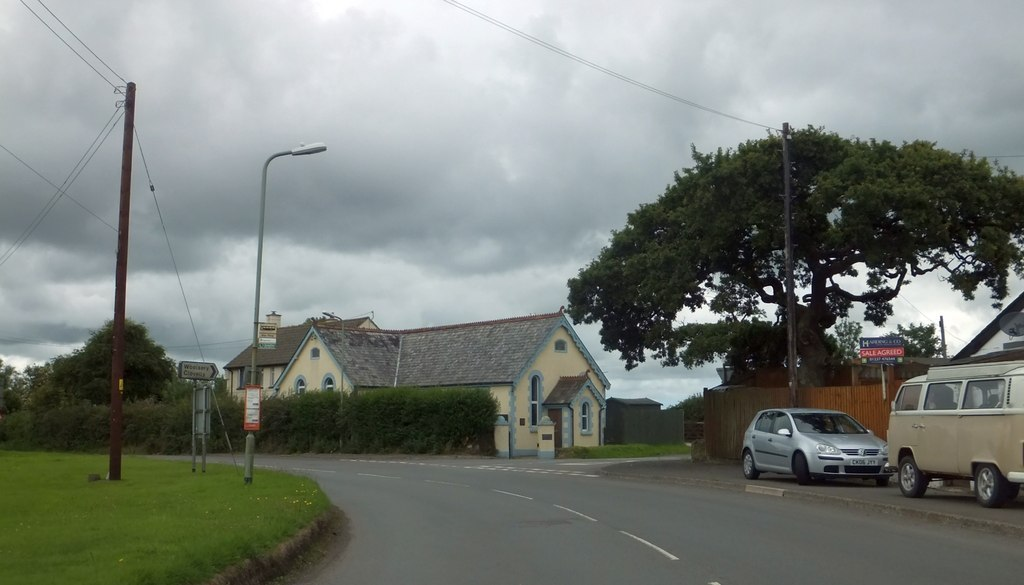
Bus stop and chapel, Stibb Cross

Stibb Cross is a village in north Devon, England. It is included in the civil parish of Langtree and is located about one mile from that village. Its population in 2001 was 677.

The word stibb is derived from Old English styb, which referred to a weapon made of wood.
