= Bendy (disambiguation) =

Bendy is a pattern of bends in heraldry.

Bendy may also refer to:

- Bendy, a character from the episodic puzzle horror video game Bendy and the Ink Machine
  - Bendy (franchise), a series of video games including and related to Bendy and the Ink Machine
- Bendy, a character from the American animated television series Foster's Home for Imaginary Friends
- Bendy, a character from the puzzle video game Portal 2
- Bendy Toys, molded latex foam coated aluminium wire toys, developed by Charles Neufeld in 1948 in UK.
