= Bendable =

Bendable may refer to:

- Articulation (disambiguation)
- Bendable concrete
- Bendable LED

== See also ==
- Bend (disambiguation)
