= Staplestreet =

Village in Kent, England

Coordinates: 51.3030°N 0.9533°E

Staplestreet is a village near the village of Boughton Street, in the Swale District of the English county of Kent. It is east of the town of Faversham. For transport there is the A2 road and the A299 road nearby.
