= M. H. Benders =

Dutch poet and philosopher

Benders in front of the city hall of Helmond

Martijn Benders (born 23 July 1971 in Helmond) is a Dutch poet and philosopher. He was the chief editor of the literary magazine De Honingzaag. As of 2026, he is the editor-in-chief of the literary magazine Foloton. Benders is known for his experimental poetry and has published several poetry collections and philosophical works.

== Career ==
In 2008, Benders published his first poetry collection, Karavanserai, with Nieuw Amsterdam publishers. The collection was nominated for the C. Buddingh'-prijs for best Dutch-language poetry debut.

At the award ceremony for the C. Buddingh'-prijs, Benders performed an unconventional act inspired by the Slovenian band Laibach. Along with Bart van der Pligt and composer Samuel Vriezen, he staged a performance that included reading an anti-prize poem and singing a song titled "Lezen is Lezen" ("Reading is Reading"), set to the tune of "Live Is Life" by Austrian band Opus.

In 2011, Benders self-published his second poetry collection, Wat koop ik voor jouw donkerwilde machten, Willem ("What Do I Buy for Your Dark-Wild Powers, William"), which received positive reviews.

In 2019, Benders co-founded the publishing house De Kaneelfabriek, inspired by the works of Bruno Schulz. He also became the chief editor of the literary-philosophical magazine De Honingzaag. That same year, he published Baah Baaah Krakschaap/De P van Winterslaap, an experimental poetry volume that sold out two print runs.

=== Recent works ===
In 2020, Benders published Waarover de Piranha droomt in de limonadesloot ("What the Piranha Dreams About in the Lemonade Ditch"), a philosophical work exploring human imagination and its relationship with reality.

In 2021, he released Ginneninne, a collection that infused the Dutch language with Gaelic and Irish-based neologisms.

In 2022, he published Amanita Muscaria, the Book of the Empress, an extensive study on the Amanita muscaria mushroom, discussing its role in human evolution and cultural significance.

In 2023, Benders released Gedichten om te Lezen in het Donker ("Poems to Read in the Dark"), a collection written after the loss of two family members. The collection explores themes of grief and reflection. He also published The Eternal Hazing, examining the portrayal of dissenting voices and the dynamics within literary institutions and censorship of leftwing voices in the coronacrisis.

In 2024, Benders published Het zijn maar Bergen ("It's Only Mountains"), a poetry collection that incorporates artificial intelligence to create a singing book, including eight forewords by deceased poets. That year, Benders also became active in two musical projects. He joined the Dutch duo Berry Lee Berry, which was featured in the Argentine Rolling Stone article "Reggae alrededor del mundo: 20 artistas para descubrir la vibración," highlighting their psychedelic-dub single "Wail O Wail O Rocka Man."

Additionally, Benders formed the German-Dutch electronic band The Stoss with Dieter Adam.

In 2026, Benders published the philosophical book Please, please let me be Human. His official website identifies The Stoss and Je Moerhussel as his principal current music projects. That year, Je Moerhussel released the album Als ik niet brand, The Stoss released Die Roboter sind wrong, and, under the Berry Lee Bey alias, he released the single Here comes the Bythos.

== Fabylon ==
Benders runs Fabylon, a publishing and software company registered in Finland and based in Kuosmala. Its imprint, Fabylon Press, publishes poetry, fiction, essays and records by Benders and other authors, including the literary magazine Foloton (2026) and Marte Bekius's novella The Blackening.

In 2026 the press started The Fabylon Classics, a series of world literature in new translation with introduction and notes. The first volume, Carl Axel Gottlund's Pieniä runoja (Finnish folk songs from Savonia, 1818) in a Dutch rendering by Benders, appeared in print; later volumes, including works by Catherine Pozzi, Saint-Pol-Roux, Zuzanna Ginczanka, Delmira Agustini and Gennady Aygi, appear exclusively in the Fabylon Reader, an e-reading application in which books are exchanged for "ink" earned by reading.

Fabylon Press also compiles three dictionaries, each in eight languages: the Fabulary, a dictionary of words coined by poets, gathered from the work of hundreds of poets and recording each word with the line in which it appeared, the poet and the year; the Faubus, a thesaurus of rare words; and the Fabyss, a satirical dictionary in the tradition of Ambrose Bierce's The Devil's Dictionary.

Fabylon also develops software for writers and publishers, including the Fabylon Suite and its own e-book file format, .fab.

== Style and themes ==
Benders' work combines various literary styles, including lyrical, conceptual, satirical, and absurdist influences. His poetry and philosophical writings often challenge conventions and critique societal structures. He incorporates elements such as performance art and multimedia into his work.

== Bibliography ==
=== Poetry collections ===
- Karavanserai (Nieuw Amsterdam, 2008)
- Wat koop ik voor jouw donkerwilde machten, Willem (Loewak, 2011; reissued by Van Gennep, 2013)
- Wôld, Wôld, Wôld! (2013)
- Sauseschritt (Van Gennep, 2015)
- Lippenspook (Van Gennep, 2016)
- Nachtefteling (Van Gennep, 2017)
- Baah Baaah Krakschaap/De P van Winterslaap (De Kaneelfabriek, 2019)
- Ginneninne (De Kaneelfabriek, 2021)
- O Kolle Klokkespin (De Kaneelfabriek, 2022)
- Gedichten om te Lezen in het Donker (De Kaneelfabriek, 2023)
- Het zijn maar Bergen (De Kaneelfabriek, 2024)
- Brattlit (Moonmoth Monestarium, 2025)
- Labrospettro (Transeuropa Edizioni, 2025)
- Liekkiö (Fabylon Press, forthcoming; written in Finnish)

=== Philosophical works ===
- Waarover de Piranha droomt in de limonadesloot (De Kaneelfabriek, 2020)
- Amanita Muscaria, the Book of the Empress (De Kaneelfabriek, 2022)
- The Eternal Hazing (De Kaneelfabriek, 2024)
- The Microdose Bible (2026)
- Please, please let me be Human (2026)

=== Novels ===
- Flierman's Passage (Van Gennep, 2016)
- De Dienst (2025; also published in Finnish as Palvelu)

=== Music ===
- The Sound of Wonty Love (Hieperdepiep Records, 2024)
- Here comes the Bythos (as Berry Lee Bey, 2026 single)
- Als ik niet brand (as Je Moerhussel, 2026)
- Wenn ich nicht brenne (as Je Moerhussel, Fabylon Records, 2026; German-language album)
- Die Roboter sind wrong (as The Stoss, 2026)
