= Stennack =

Hamlet in Cornwall, England

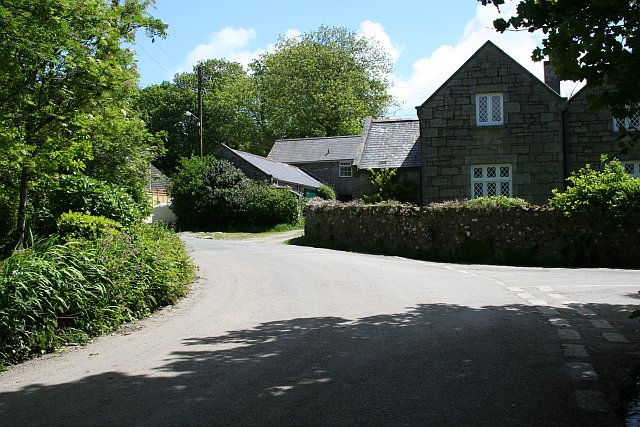
Stennack

Stennack (Cornish: Stenek) is a hamlet southwest of Troon in west Cornwall, England, United Kingdom.
