= Stebbing Green =

Hamlet in Essex, England

Coordinates: 51.8828°N 0.4451°E

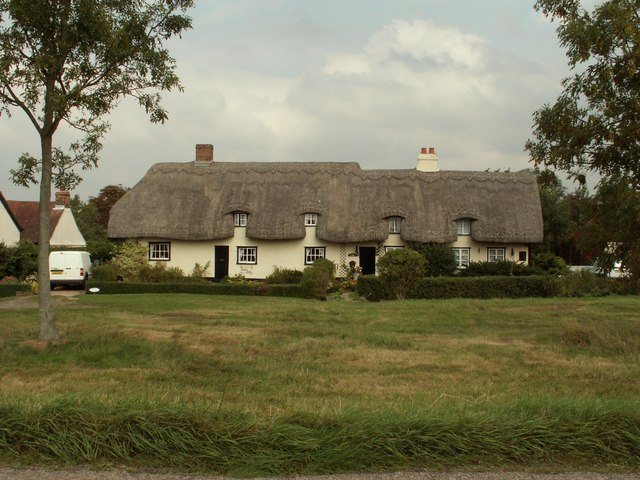

- Location within Essex
- Civil parish: Stebbing
- District: Uttlesford
- Shire county: Essex
- Region: East
- Country: England
- Sovereign state: United Kingdom
- Police: Essex
- Fire: Essex
- Ambulance: East of England

Stebbing Green is a hamlet in the civil parish of Stebbing, in the Uttlesford district, in the county of Essex, England. It is near the village of Stebbing; its post town is Dunmow. It is near the B1256 road (Dunmow Road) and the main A120 road.

== Bibliography ==
- Essex A-Z
