= Patrick J. Stiff =

American bone marrow transplant doctor

- Born: November 27, 1950 (age 75)
- Education: University of Toledo
- Occupations: Hematology, Hematology & Oncology, Internal Medicine, Medical Oncology
- Years active: 1975-Present
- Known for: Developments in bone marrow transplantation
- Honours: Loyola's Strich School of Medicine's Stirch Award

Patrick J. Stiff (born November 27, 1950) is an American bone marrow transplant specialist. Stiff is a pioneer of the time with his technologies being used and his advances being applied to patients with leukemia and lymphoma.

== Early life and education ==
Stiff was born in 1950 to Irene and Philip Stiff, and grew up in Toledo, Ohio, where he graduated from St. Francis de Sales High School in 1968. Being one of seven children, Stiff didn't play sports growing up; although, he had aspirations of playing basketball or wrestling due to his height. Since that wasn't in the cards, Stiff focused on study, where his love for medicine grew. Knowing that he wanted to go into medicine, Stiff attended the University of Toledo, where he graduated with a bachelor of science in 1972 and an undergraduate degree in chemistry. From there Stiff went on to attend Loyola University Stritch School of Medicine. The Stiff family was no stranger to the Loyola Campus with Stiff's father attending the school. Following in his father's footsteps, Stiff graduated from Loyola University Stritch School of Medicine with an MD in 1975, where he was a member of Alpha Omega Alpha, the medical honor society. After medical school, Stiff completed his residency program at Cleveland Clinic Hospital in 1978. From there, he was an American Cancer Society Fellow in medical oncology at the Memorial Sloan Kettering Cancer Center in New York for three years from 1978 to 1981. After completing his fellowship, he returned to Loyola, where he was a clinical professor at the Loyola University Stritch School of Medicine and director of the Bone Marrow Transplantation Program.

== Career ==
Stiff has been a faculty member of Loyola since 1986 during his time he developed a freezing process for the Loyola Medical Center Bone Marrow Transplant Program which is one of the largest and most successful bone marrow transplant programs in the world. Stiff's method has been used to save many lives in many major medical centers throughout the US. The process freezes the marrow with a mixture of DMSO, hydroxyethyl, and starch and places it in a mechanical freezer DMSO stabilizes the cells during freezing and the hydroxyethyl eliminates the need for freezing at such a low temperature. Since Stiff eliminated the use of liquid nitrogen from the old method, he made the process quicker so instead of eight hours Stiff's method only takes two hours. Due to his leadership, Stiff brought clinical research programs to 10 community hospitals in Chicago's west and south suburbs, changing the standard of care worldwide. His technologies are applied to leukemia and lymphoma cases. Stiff was the director of Loyola's Bone Marrow Transplant Program which started in Jan. 1986. Under his direction, the program was involved in the study of a new class of drug called Aziridinyl-benzoquinone (AZQ) to treat patients with refractory tumors.

The main research areas were umbilical cord blood transplantation, ex-vivo expansion of hematopoietic stem cells, and cancer vaccines for ovarian cancer. There, he initiated the autologous stem cell transplantation program Through his research, Stiff performed the first successful transplants involving bone marrow cells that were collected from the patient or donor and then grown in a lab from there he led the first successful international study of expanding the number of cells from donated umbilical cord blood, which is an alternative to bone marrow transplants. Stiff transplanted to the youngest ever to receive a bone marrow transplant, a 10-month-old, who is now in college training to become a nurse at this time. Among Stiff's many accomplishments, he is a board member of the American Society of Blood and Marrow Transplantation, the chair of the Medical Advisory Board for the Leukemia Research Foundation, the chair of the Blood and Marrow Transplant Committee for the Southwest Oncology Group, the director of the Cardinal Bernardin Cancer Center at Loyola University, director of the Division of Hematology/Oncology at the Stritch School of Medicine Coleman Professor of Oncology and is a Board-certified in Internal medicine Medical Oncology and Hematology. On top of working at Loyola, Stiff held faculty positions at Cornell University Medical College in New York and Southern Illinois University School of Medicine.

== Awards and honors ==
Stiff was awarded Loyola Stritch School of Medicine's Stritch Medal in 2016 which is the highest honor given by Loyola University Chicago Stritch School of Medicine. This honor is awarded to a Loyola graduate or faculty member who exhibits dedication to research, education and patient care recognizing their accomplishments. This medal was presented to him at the Stritch Annual Award Dinner in 2016. Stiff was listed in the Marquis Who's Who publication for more than 20 consecutive years and received the Albert Nelson Marquis Lifetime Achievement Award in 2017. He was the featured Speaker of the 2019 Leukemia Research Foundation's 73rd Annual Awards Presentation. He was one of Chicago Magazine's Top Docs in 2021. On top of that, he wrote more than 160 articles and book chapters in peer-reviewed publications. He also received the St Francis de Sales High School Golden Knight Award in 2010.

== Personal life ==
In his free time, Stiff considers himself an "excitement junkie." He climbed Mount Kilimanjaro in 2012, climbed to the base camp of Mount Everest, camped near the North Pole in the Norwegian islands and went dog sledding in Sweden. Stiff also hiked in the Jordan desert, hiked to the bottom of the Grand Canyon, and climbed back up on the same day with a former patient and her husband. Stiff also ran the Bank of America Chicago Marathon. Stiff regards his proudest accomplishment as "his success as a parent, and now, grandparent." He has 5 children, 4 biological and 1 adopted. Stiff has 7 grandchildren. Stiff adopted through medical foster care with Catholic Charities. He fostered 28 children with his late wife Betsy Ann Erhmin Stiff before adopting. One of his 5 children also entered the medical field, and is now a nurse practitioner for the Frankel Cardiovascular Center at the University of Michigan Ann Arbor. His adopted son also planned to enter the medical field but switched majors. Stiff now lives in Naperville Illinois with his current wife Astrid Walch Stiff, he still has his love of traveling, and they frequently go on adventures an excursions. Stiff and Walch Stiff have a second home in England that they visit frequently.

== Sources ==
- Dawes, K.O. "Family Seeks Marrow Donor for Son Who Has Leukemia." Chicago Sun-Times, 8 Dec. 1989, p. 30.
- Loyola University Medical Center. "Stiff settles in as chief of bone marrow transplant unit ." Loyola World, vol. 5, no. 4, 27 Feb. 1986, pp. 1–7.
- Newstead, Elizabeth. "Progress against cancer." Strich M.D, vol. 3, no. 2, 1989, pp. 9–13.
- Schencker, Lisa. "Loyola Hopes to Improve on Recent Breakthrough in Battle Against Cancer." Chicago Tribune, 26 Sept. 2018, pp. 1–3.
- Battaglia, Natalie. Loyola Medical News, 2017, p. 13.
- BMT Info Net. "Webinar: Stem Cell Transplants for AML What You Need to Know 2016." YouTube, YouTube, 2016, www.youtube.com/watch?v=TBdsdFcxr6c.
- "Patrick Stiff, MD, Is Co-Author of Landmark CAR T-Cell Cancer Treatment Study in New England Journal of Medicine." Trinity Health, 9 Dec. 2017, https://www.loyolamedicine.org/newsroom/press-releases/patrick-stiff-md-coauthor-landmark-car-tcell-cancer-treatment-study-new. Accessed 22 Sept. 2024.
