= Simon J. Bending =

British physicist (born 1957)

Simon J. Bending FInstP
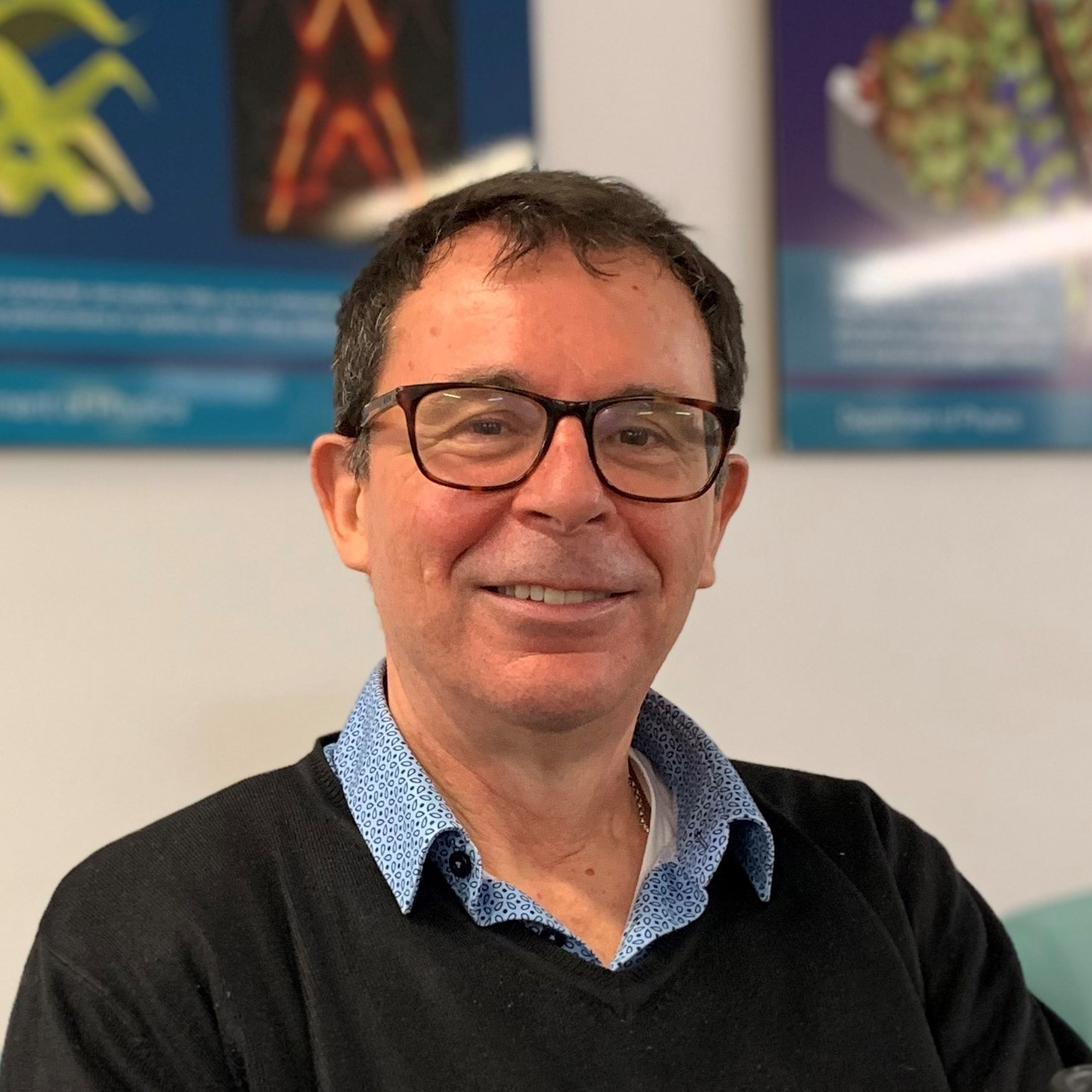
- Prof Simon J. Bending - 09 Feb 2022
- Born: October 29, 1957 (age 68); Brentwood, Essex, UK
- Education: University of Cambridge
- Known for: Superconductivity; Scanning Hall probe microscopy
- Scientific career
- Fields: Solid State Physics; superconductors; nanomagnetism; 2D materials
- Workplaces: University of Bath; University of Cambridge; Stanford University
- Thesis: Tunneling and Transport via Localised States in α-Si Tunnel Barriers (1985)
- Doctoral advisor: Malcolm Beasley
- Other academic advisors: Malcolm Beasley; Theodore H. Geballe; Klaus von Klitzing
- Website: people.bath.ac.uk/pyssb/profsj.htm

Simon John Bending, FInstP (born 29 October 1957) is a British physicist. He is a professor in the Department of Physics at the University of Bath, where he was the Head of department from 2013 to 2016. He is co-director of the Bath-Exeter Centre for Graphene Science and deputy director of the Bath-Bristol EPRSC Centre for Doctoral Training in Condensed Matter Physics. He developed scanning Hall probe microscopy and has made notable contributions to the field of superconductors.

== Early life and education ==
Bending was born in Brentwood, Essex 29 October 1957 and attended St Peter's School, in South Weald, from 1962 to 1969 and then King Edward VI Grammar School, Chelmsford from 1969 to 1976. In 1979, he graduated B.A. Hons (1st. class) in Natural Sciences - Physics from the University of Cambridge. He obtained his PhD in 1985, from the Applied Physics Department at Stanford University.

== Research ==
Following his PhD, Bending joined the group of Dr P. Guéret at IBM Research Laboratories, Zürich, Switzerland, as a postdoc, in 1985. In 1986, he became a postdoc in the group of Prof. Klaus von Klitzing, at the Max Planck Institut FKF, in Stuttgart, Germany. An year earlier, Von Klitzing had been awarded the Physics Nobel Prize. Bending joined the University of Bath in 1989, first as a Lecturer and then as a Senior Lecturer, from 1995. In 1991–92, Bending supervised Andre Geim as a postdoc in his group. Geim was subsequently awarded the 2010 Physics Nobel Prize. In 1996, Bending was promoted to Reader and, in 2000, he was appointed to a personal chair in the Department of Physics.

Much of Bending's research evolved from his development of scanning Hall probe microscopy. Highlights of his work include studies of vortex matter in highly anisotropic superconductors, ferromagnetic superconductors, ferromagnet-superconductor heterostructures, domain wall phenomena and dynamics in ferromagnetic thin films and the realisation of novel hybrid material structures by electrocrystallisation. More recently the focus of Bending's research has shifted to new physics in two-dimensional crystals, e.g., graphene and other layered (super)conductors.

== Awards and recognition ==
- Elected Fellow of the Institute of Physics.
- 2002, Mott Prize Lecture at the European Physical Society Condensed Matter meeting, Brighton.
- 1999, Royal Society Leverhulme Trust Senior Research Fellowship
- 1990, Joint winner of the Philip Morris Prize for Information Technology and Communications, Münich, Germany.
- 1984, IBM Student Fellowship at Stanford University, California.
