= Mannings Heath Golf & Wine Estate =

Golf & Wine estate in Mannings Heath, Horsham, England

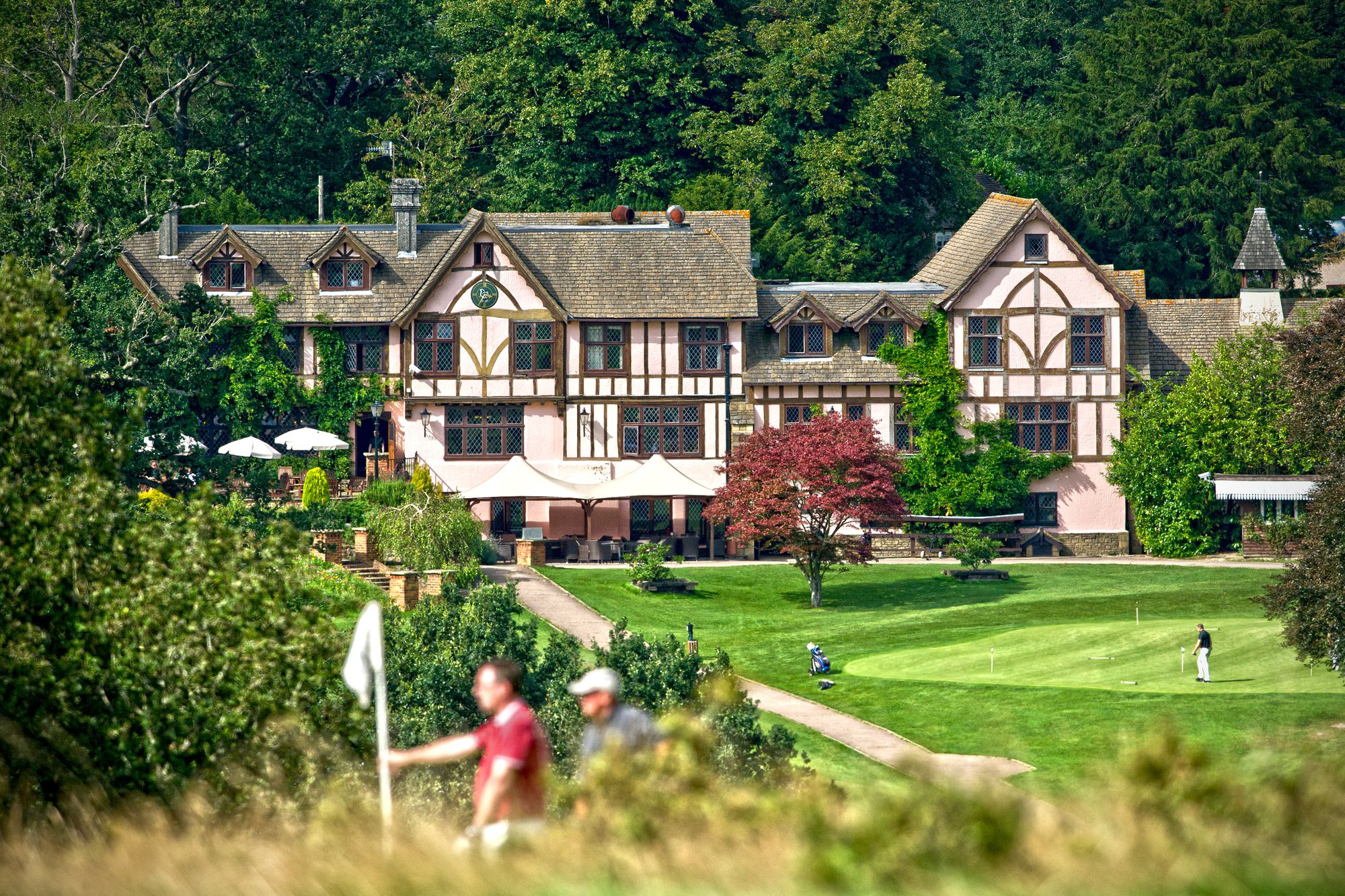
- Mannings Heath Clubhouse
- Interactive map of Mannings Heath Golf & Wine Estate
- 51.052179°N 0.273444°W

Club information
- Location: Hammerpond Road, Mannings Heath, Horsham, West Sussex, England, RH13 6PG
- Established: 1914; 112 years ago
- Owner: Benguela Collection Penny Streeter
- Tota holes: 27
- Tournaments: PGA EuroPro Tour
- Website: www.manningsheath.com

Waterfall Course - 18 Hole
- Designed by: Harry Colt
- Par: 72
- Length: 6,683 yards

Kingfisher Course - 9 Hole
- Designed by: Harry Colt
- Par: 36
- Length: 3,314 yards

Mannings Heath Golf & Wine Estate is located in Mannings Heath, Horsham in the south of England. The 500 acre parkland site includes two golf courses and a vineyard.

The estate was acquired by Penny Streeter OBE in 2016 and is a division of The Benguela Collection, a wine producer and hospitality group in the United Kingdom and South Africa.

Mannings Heath hosts PGA EuroPro tours.

== History ==
The land the course sits on was used in the 18th century as a meeting point for smugglers. In the late 1740s, its Hawkin's Pond was the scene of one of the Hawkhurst Gang's murders.

Mannings Heath was opened as a golf course in 1914, after having been designed by the English architect Harry Colt. Almost immediately after the course was laid, the land was seized for agricultural purposes to aid the war effort during World War I. The effects of war were felt again during World War II, when a Handley Page Halifax Bomber crashed on the golf course on 17 February 1945. The site has an official plaque memorial to commemorate the loss of life.
