= Articulation score =

In telecommunications, an articulation score (AS) is a subjective measure of the intelligibility of a voice system in terms of the percentage of words correctly understood over a channel perturbed by interference.

Articulation scores have been experimentally obtained as functions of varying word content, bandwidth, audio signal-to-noise ratio and the experience of the talkers and listeners involved.
