= Benjamin Buit =

Dutch YouTuber (born 2008)

- Born: Benjamin Julius Pearson Buit; 7 October 2008 (age 18); Netherlands
- Other name: BENDER
- Occupation: YouTuber

YouTube information
- Channel: BENDER
- Years active: 2023–present
- Genres: Journalism; politics; comedy; satire
- Subscribers: 322 thousand
- Views: 62.3 million
- Last updated: 7 February 2025

Benjamin Buit (born 2008) is a Dutch YouTuber and internet personality known for his videos, in which he asks critical questions in a journalistic style and participates in events and demonstrations.

== BENDER ==
Buit, together with his brother Tommy Buit and Frits-Willem van der Hoeven, runs a YouTube channel called BENDER. The three create videos on various topics, sometimes with a political angle. They made international news after covering the rioting Maccabi fans in Amsterdam.

== Personal life ==
Buit grew up in Het Gooi. On his mother's side, he is the grandson of Rob Out, former program director of Radio Veronica.
