= Bend (programming language) =

- Developer: Victor Taelin
- First appeared: 2024; 2 years ago
- Stable release: 2.0.40 / November 6, 2026; 6 days ago
- OS: Linux, Mac OS X
- Website: bend-lang.com

Influenced by
- Haskell, Lean (proof assistant)

Bend is a pure functional programming language with support for autoparallelisation and (since version 2) secure program synthesis, with the intention of permitting bug-free vibe coding.

As all variables in Bend are immutable, threads can freely be created and access data without the need for locking techniques such as synchronization. Bend automatically runs code in parallel - on both CPUs and GPUs - without the need for either explicit concurrency with processes and message passing as in Erlang, or libraries or extensions as in Haskell.

In Bend version 2, the ability to embed formal mathematical proofs of code correctness was added to the language. This means that the Bend v2 compiler incorporates a mathematical proof checker. It can be much faster to check proofs than proof assistants such as Lean and Rocq.
