= Articulatory technique =

Articulatory technique is a type of Osteopathic Manipulative Treatment (OMT) performed by osteopathic practitioners and U.S. trained osteopathic physicians. The physician uses low velocity and moderate to high amplitude forces to carry a dysfunctional joint through its full range of motion, with the therapeutic goal of increasing range of motion. It is a technique that involves repeatedly taking a restricted joint into and out of its barrier to reduce a restriction.
