= Stiff Street =

Hamlet in Kent, England

Coordinates: 51.3185°N 0.6868°E

- Location within Kent
- OS grid reference: TQ8761
- Civil parish: Bredgar
- District: Swale
- Shire county: Kent
- Region: South East
- Country: England
- Sovereign state: United Kingdom
- Post town: Sittingbourne
- Postcode district: ME9
- Police: Kent
- Fire: Kent
- Ambulance: South East Coast
- UK Parliament: Sittingbourne and Sheppey

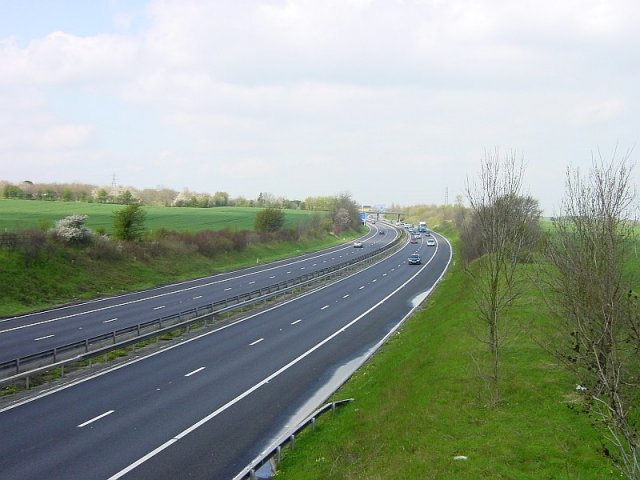
M2 between Wrens Road and Stiff Street, looking west

Stiff Street is a hamlet almost on the M2 motorway, near the village of Bredgar, in the Swale District, in the English county of Kent. The nearest town is Sittingbourne.
