= Articulata =

Articulata is a Latin word meaning articulated or jointed. In taxonomy, it is used to refer to various subdivisions.

It may refer to:

- Articulata (Brachiopoda), one of two main divisions of the brachiopods having two valves with an articulating hinge
- Articulata (Crinoidea), a subclass of crinoids, the only such to survive past the Paleozoic era
- Articulata (Cyclostomata), a group of cyclostome bryozoans, also known as Articulina
- Articulata (superphylum), a possible superphylum consisting of Annelida and Panarthropoda
