= Peter Stiff =

South African author

- Born: 8 September 1933; London, United Kingdom
- Died: 27 April 2016 (aged 82)
- Occupation: Author
- Children: 4

Peter Stiff (8 September 1933 – 27 April 2016) was a London-born South African best-selling author of both fiction and non fiction.

== Biography ==
Peter lived in Rhodesia for 28 years and served as a regular policeman for 20 years in the elite British South Africa Police, from which he retired as a superintendent in 1972. He moved to South Africa in 1980 after the fall of Rhodesia and the rise of Robert Mugabe and his ZANU-PF.

Peter was specialized in contemporary warfare and politics in the southern African sub-continent and authored books extensively on the bush war in the former Rhodesia, the ongoing conflict in Angola and the Namibian bush war, on the collapse of Portuguese power in Angola and Mozambique and much else as well.

== Books ==
- The Rain Goddess: Set in the war-torn area of Rhodesia's (before 1966, Southern Rhodesia; now Zimbabwe) North-East border, a region which the Rhodesian military staff called "Hurricane", the story takes place during the mid-1960s to early 1970s, as the British South Africa Police fight against communist-backed guerillas. These guerrillas use torture and violence to intimidate African tribesmen into joining their cause. The Rhodesian Security forces fight to keep a fragile peace that is governed by force of arms, as well as by the tribesmens' faith in the predictions of their spirit medium. This medium is said to be able to communicate with the spirit of the Rain Goddess. While the book was originally written as fiction, many of the events in the book are taken from actual events with some names of persons and places changed.
- Selous Scouts: Top Secret War
- See you in November
- The Covert War
- Taming the Landmine
- Nine Days of War
- The Silent War: South African Recce Operations 1969–1994
- Cry Zimbabwe: Independence – Twenty Years on
- Warfare by Other Means: South Africa in the 1980s and 1990s
