= Lellizzick =

Hamlet in Cornwall, England

Coordinates: 50.55883°N 4.95458°W

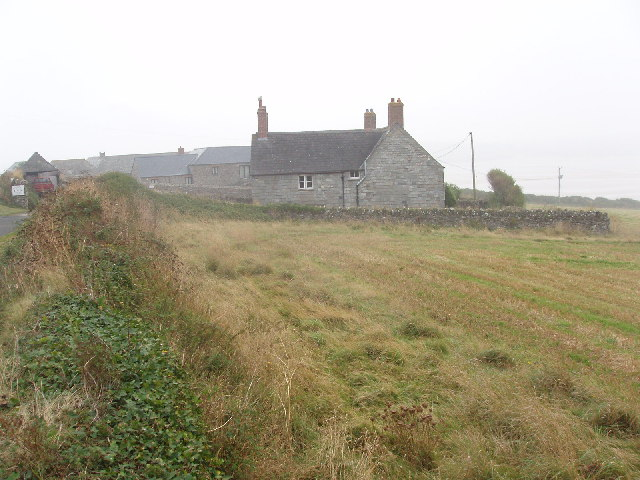
Lellizzick farmstead from the west

Lellizzick (Cornish: Lannwlesik) is a farmstead settlement in north Cornwall, England. It is situated approximately 1 mile (1.6 km) north of Padstow on the lane from Crugmeer to Hawkers Cove.

A gated vehicle track leads north from Lellizzick to the National Coastwatch Institution watch station on Stepper Point. A permissive footpath leads south to Tregirls beach.

== Archaeology ==
In the late 1990s, aerial photography by archaeologists revealed a number of circular and semi-circular crop marks in two clifftop fields near Lellizzick. Metal detectorists also discovered flints and pottery from the Mesolithic period as well as later artefacts from the post-Roman period.

In October 2007, the Channel 4 television series Time Team visited Lellizzick to investigate the site and the features revealed by the earlier aerial photography were confirmed by a geophysics survey. The resulting television programme, titled From Constantinople to Cornwall, was broadcast in March 2008 (see list of episodes). The excavation and investigation revealed a roundhouse settlement.

During the Roman and early medieval periods it was classified as a settlement.
