= Tregirls =

Farm in Cornwall, England

Coordinates: 50°33′00″N 4°56′59″W

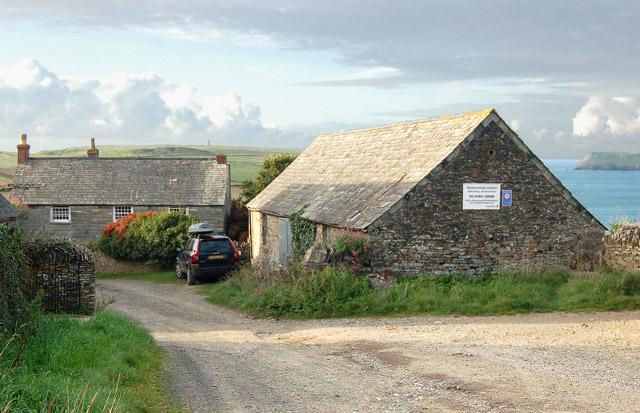
Tregirls farmstead from the south

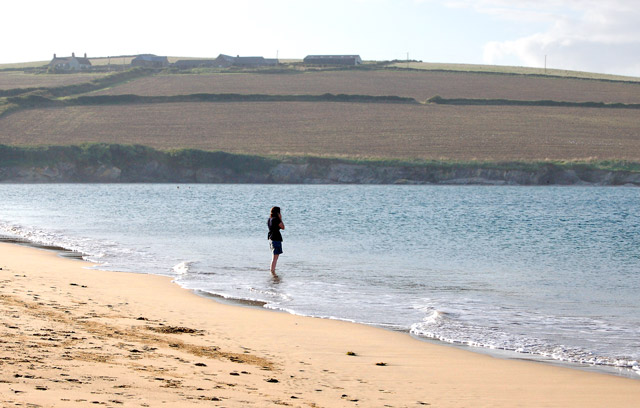
Tregirls beach with Lellizzick beyond

Tregirls (Cornish: Tregrylles) is a farmstead in Cornwall, United Kingdom. It is situated approximately half-a-mile (1 km) north of Padstow. The settlement consists of a farm and converted cottages which are let as holiday accommodation.

Tregirls beach (which takes its name from the settlement) is 500 metres north at grid reference SW 911 769. The north-facing beach is in the River Camel estuary and is backed by dunes with a small stream trickling across the sand at low tide from the corner of the beach tucked hard behind Stepper Point known as Harbour Cove. Beyond Harbour Cove towards Stepper Point is Hawkers Cove, previously the location of the RNLI Padstow lifeboat, now too shallow even at high tide and dry sand at low tide, the result of the sands shifting over the years. The South West Coast Path runs behind the beach before climbing above the rocky side of the river at Hawkers Cove on its way to the Daymark on Stepper Point.

Today at low water Tregirls beach extends half-a-mile into the estuary and at its northeast point forms the Doom Bar, a spit of sand across the river mouth. However this was not always so as the deep water channel used to run close to Stepper Point, as is evidenced by the old lifeboat station being located at Harbour Cove.

The settlement of Tregirls takes its name from the manor of Grylls or Tregrylls of which it was a parcel along with Crugmeer, Treator, and Trenio.
