= Hawker's Cove, Cornwall =

Coordinates: 50.5604°N 4.9491°W

Hawker's Cove
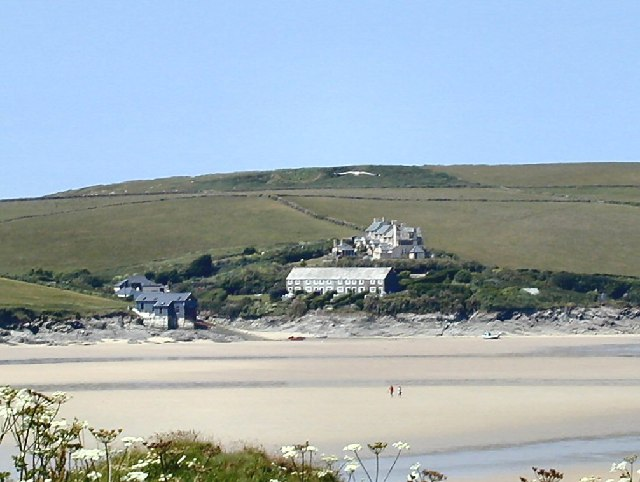
- Hawker's Cove at low water

- Location within Cornwall
- OS grid reference: SW912776
- Civil parish: Padstow
- Unitary authority: Cornwall
- Ceremonial county: Cornwall
- Region: South West
- Country: England
- Sovereign state: United Kingdom
- Post town: PADSTOW
- Postcode district: PL28
- Dialling code: 01841
- Police: Devon and Cornwall
- Fire: Cornwall
- Ambulance: South Western
- UK Parliament: North Cornwall

Hawker's Cove is a small coastal settlement in north Cornwall, England. It is situated one-and-a-half miles (2 kilometres) north of Padstow on the west side of the River Camel estuary.

The hamlet consists of two terraces of cottages, a few detached dwellings, a coastguard station and a boathouse with a slipway which once housed the Padstow lifeboat. The actor Edward Woodward lived there until his death in 2009. The first lifeboat, built by the Padstow Harbour Association, was kept at Hawker's Cove and in 1855 the Padstow branch of the RNLI was formed. A new boathouse with a roller slipway was built in 1931. By the 1960s, silting was becoming a problem and in October 1967 the Padstow lifeboat relocated to a new boathouse and slipway at Trevose Head, a few miles to the west. Facilities at Hawkers Cove are limited, although there is now a (tiny) tea garden at the back of the two-hundred-year-old ‘Coastguard Houses’, approximately 150m from the slipway at the beach.

Evidence has been found of occupation during the Bronze Age, Iron Age and Roman periods, and the use of Harbour Cove for trading vessels.

Road access to Hawker's Cove is via a lane which leads from the Padstow-St Merryn road through Crugmeer to Lellizzick. As traffic is discouraged beyond Lellizzick, motorists are directed to a nearby carpark from where a track leads to the coastpath at Tregirls beach.

== Geography ==
Between Padstow and Hawker's Cove the South West Coast Path passes Gun Point, site of an abandoned gun emplacement and fortifications dating back to the Napoleonic War. This stretch of path has fairly easy gradients and is well-surfaced, but beyond Hawker's Cove it steepens on the climb up to Stepper Point. There are no toilets or other public facilities nearby.

The ebb tide uncovers a wide sandy beach which, at low water, extends across the estuary mouth towards Trebetherick Point. But at high water, the beach is submerged and the sand bank is the notorious Doom Bar which presents a hazard to shipping.
