= Padstow Lifeboat Station =

RNLI lifeboat station in Cornwall, England

- Flag of the RNLI

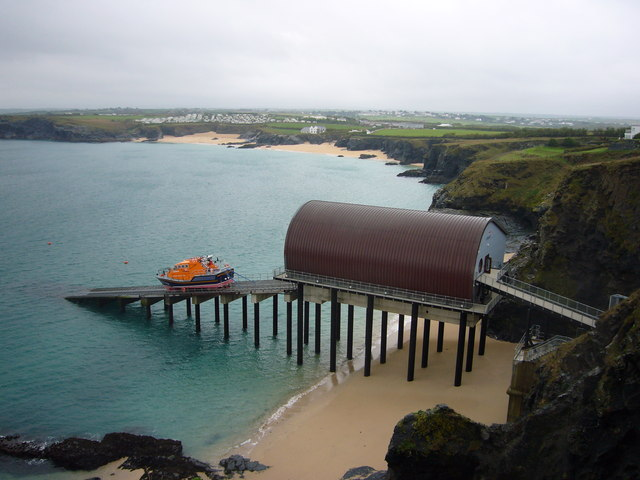
- Padstow lifeboat station in 2006

- Location within Cornwall

General information
- Type: RNLI Lifeboat Station
- Location: Trevose Head,, Padstow, Cornwall, PL28 8SL, England
- Coordinates: 50°32′56″N 5°1′18″W
- Opened: First lifeboat 1827; Current building 2006
- Cost: £6,829,900
- Owner: RNLI

Design and construction
- Architecture firm: Poynton Bradbury Wynter Cole
- Engineer: Haskoning UK

Website
- rnli.org/find-my-nearest/lifeboat-stations/padstow-lifeboat-station

Padstow Lifeboat Station can be found at Trevose Head, approximately 5 miles (8.0 km) west of Padstow, on the north-west coast of the county of Cornwall, England.

A lifeboat was first placed at Padstow in 1827, and stationed at Hawker's Cove on the River Camel estuary from 1829. Management of the station was transferred to the Royal National Lifeboat Institution in 1856.

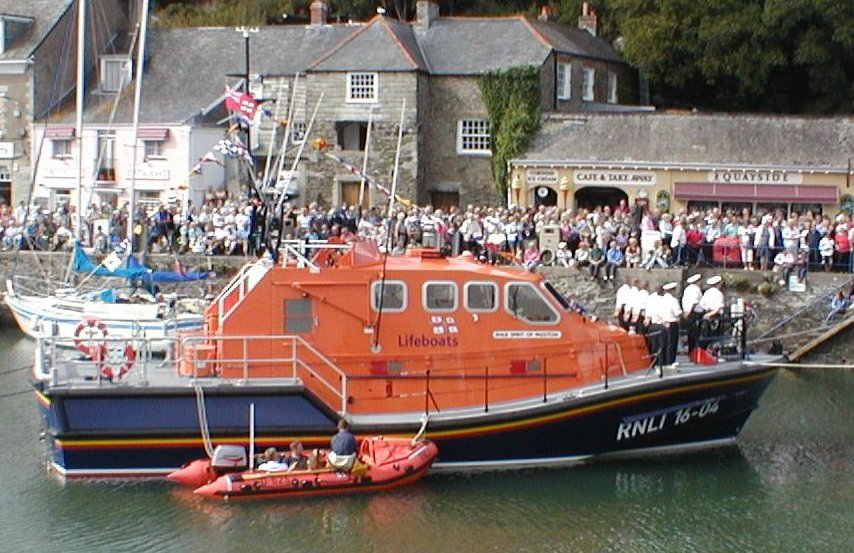
Tamar-class All-weather lifeboat, 16-04 Spirit of Padstow (ON 1283)

The station currently operates the Tamar-class All-weather lifeboat, 16-04 Spirit of Padstow (ON 1283), on station since 2006.

== History ==
The entrance to the River Camel is difficult to navigate because of the Doom Bar sandbank, also known as the Dunbar sands. This, and the steep cliffs and rocks along coast either side of the estuary, has been the site of many shipwrecks. On 26 December 1826, the brig Lord Dupplin was wrecked on the Dunbar sands, whilst on passage from Newport to London. Four pilots set out to assist, but three were lost when their boat capsized.

The following year, a small double-ended lifeboat, Mariners Friend, was built by local boat builder Tredwen for £50, funded by the subscription of local people, with a gift of £10 from the Royal National Institution for the Preservation of Life from Shipwreck (RNIPLS), (later to become the RNLI is 1854).

The Padstow Harbour Association for the Preservation of Life and Property from Shipwreck was founded at a public meeting on 11 November 1829. Additional funding came from Lloyd's of London and several companies involved in shipping along the coast. Equipment was provided to help vessels enter and leave the estuary; Manby's mortars were provided to help crews escape shipwrecks, and a boathouse was built at Hawker's Cove for the lifeboat, which was closer to the Doom Bar than the quay, where it had previously been kept.

However, by 1855, the Harbour Association lifeboat Mariners Friend was in poor condition. A letter stating the necessity of a new lifeboat at Padstow was received from Mr Bryant, the local Receiver of Admiralty Droits, and read at the meeting of the RNLI committee of management on Thursday 5 July 1855. A lifeboat rowing just six oars and of light weight was requested, due to the low number of competent hands available, but to be capable of good speed in a strong tide. With the promise of local annual subscriptions, and the provision of launching and transporting equipment, it was agreed to establish a branch of the Institution at Padstow.

A 30 ft (9.1 m) Peake-class self-righting 'Pulling and Sailing' (P&S) lifeboat, one with sails and (six) oars, was constructed by Forrestt, at a cost of £133, and arrived at Padstow on 3 June 1856. The existing boathouse at Hawker's Cove was provided to house the boat, and it was planned that two carriages may be made available, one stored on each side of the Camel estuary, for transporting the lifeboat north or south if required. The lifeboat was named Albert Edward after The Prince of Wales.

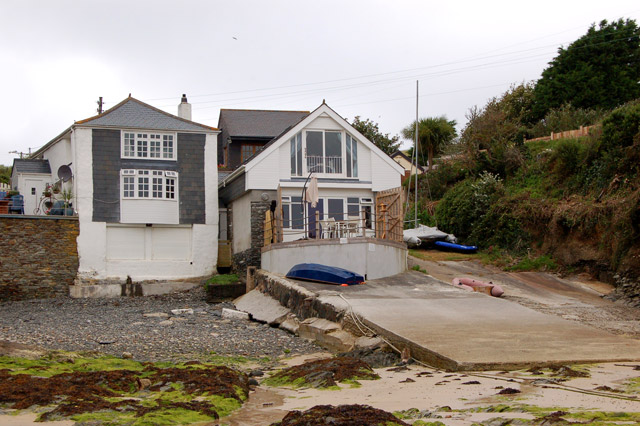
The 1829 and 1864 boathouses

Albert Edward had a successful eight years at Padstow, launching nine times, and saving 38 lives. A larger 32 ft (9.8 m) lifeboat was provided in 1864, and a new boathouse was constructed alongside the old one at Hawker's Cove. The new lifeboat was funded by the City of Bristol Lifeboat Fund, thanks to the efforts of Capt. Robert Tryon, RN, and in recognition of the good work of the previous boat, was also given the name Albert Edward. The lifeboat, built by Woolfe, and costing £224, was first transported to Bristol free of charge by the Great Western Railway, and placed on display in June 1864. It was then further conveyed to Padstow by the generosity of the Bristol and Exeter, South Devon and Cornwall railway companies.

After the schooner Georgiana was wrecked on the Doom Bar in a gale on 6 February 1867, whilst on passage from Rouen to Cork, the lifeboat was launched, but capsized. The lifeboat self-righted, but five of the lifeboat crew had been lost. The Institution voted £210 to a local fund for dependents, which ultimately raised £2,188, and also paid the funeral expenses. A memorial was placed on the wall of St Petroc's church. All but one of the crew of the Georgiana managed to get ashore after the boat ran aground.

On the 9 August 1879, for reasons unknown, five ladies were being towed in their rowing boat behind a fishing boat. When another small boat was capsized, Miss Ellen Prideaux Brune demanded that her boat be cast off, and rowing through heavy surf to the casualty boat, the ladies managed to save the life of a drowning sailor. Four Prideaux Brune sisters, and a friend, Miss Nora O’Shaughnessy, were each awarded the RNLI Silver Medal. "The Thanks of the Institution on Vellum" was accorded to The Hon. John Gage Prendergast Vereker, and former lifeboat coxswain Samuel Bate, for their rescue of another boy from the same boat.

The lifeboats were often taken overland to alternative launch sites, either because the weather prevented crossing the Doom Bar, or to be nearer to the ship to be aided. A building to house both the lifeboat carriage and the rocket brigade equipment was constructed in 1883 on Trethillick Lane, between Trethillick and Crugmeer, (50°32′55.6″N 4°57′42.5″W). When it was required, the carriage was taken to the harbour, with the lifeboat rowed up from Hawker's Cove and loaded onto the carriage. Horses for the carriage were borrowed from farmers.

=== Steam power and disaster ===
At a meeting of the RNLI committee of management in 1897, with consideration of many unsuccessful rescue attempts due to the exposure of north-west Cornwall and the full force of the Atlantic Ocean, it was decided to place a powerful Steam-class lifeboat at Padstow, which could operate further from the station or in bad weather.

The 56 ft 6 in (17.22 m) steam lifeboat James Stevens No. 4 (ON 421) arrived on station in February 1899. Too large to fit in a boathouse, it was moored afloat at the harbour. The P&S lifeboat continued to be kept in the boathouse at Hawker's Cove, and would be known as Padstow No. 1, whilst the new steam-powered lifeboat at the harbour would be Padstow No. 2.

Just over one year later, one event would see the loss of both Padstow lifeboats. On the evening of the 11 April 1900, the ketch Peace and Plenty of Lowestoft dragged her anchor in a gale, and struck the Greenaway Rocks. The Hawker's Cove lifeboat Arab (ON 51) was launched at 20:30, but after dropping anchor and attempting to veer down to the vessel, she was hit by a huge wave, which washed eight lifeboat men overboard, and broke 10 oars. The men all regained the boat, but with no oars, were powerless to do anything. With the boat still anchored, the coxswain kept the boat head to the sea, and let out the line, until it was in a cove, and out of the worst of the breaking sea. All crew members managed to get ashore, but the lifeboat was then wrecked on the rocks.

The Padstow steam lifeboat James Stevens No. 4 set out at 21:30. Leaving the harbour, the boat was hit broadside by a heavy swell, and immediately turned over. Second coxswain Oscar French was at the helm, and didn't immediately realise the boat had been rolled over. When he let go of the wheel and surfaced, he was surprised to see the lifeboat capsized, with the propellers still turning. He was one of just three survivors of a crew of 11. The four men in the engine room (John Martin, James Old, Joseph Stephens and Sydney East) were unable to escape and four of the deck crew (David Grubb (coxswain), John Bate, James Grubb and Edward Kane) were also drowned.

The Rocket Brigade set out from the Trebetherick Rocket House, which still stands today next to the convenience stores on Ham Field, and rescued five of the eight crew of the Peace and Plenty. A memorial to seven of the lost lifeboat crew is in Padstow Cemetery, with the eighth man buried at St Merryn. The wrecked steam lifeboat was sold for £50. The Committee of Management voted £1,000 to a local fund for the dependents.

=== 1901–1960 ===
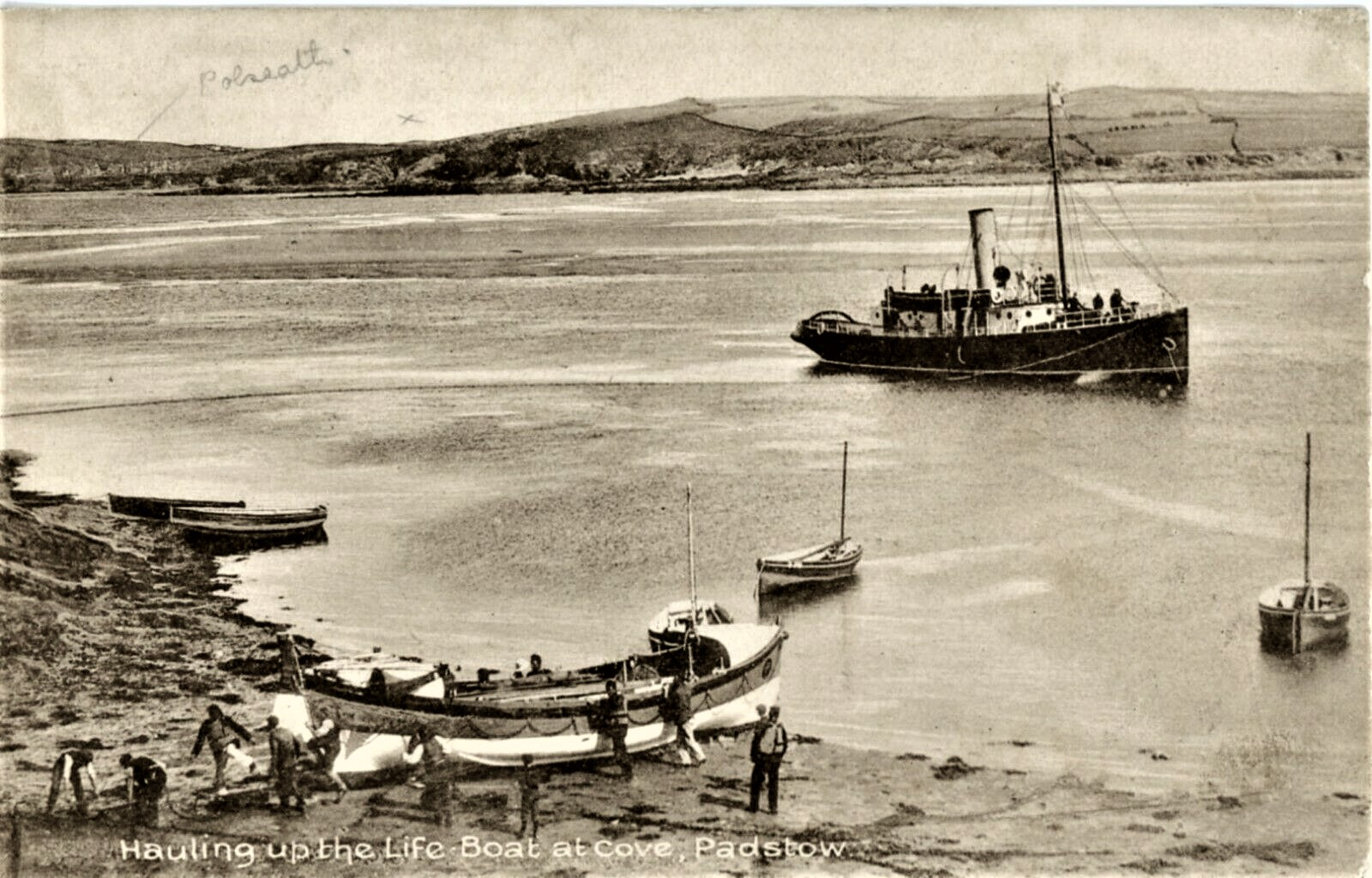
Padstow lifeboat Arab (ON 472) and RNSLB Helen Peele

Both stations remained off service until 1901, by which time new crews had been formed. In accordance with their wishes, two self-righting lifeboats were placed at each of the Padstow stations. A 36 ft (11 m) lifeboat was sent to Hawker's Cove, again taking the name Arab (ON 472), and a 42 ft (13 m) boat, Edmund Harvey (ON 475), was placed at Padstow Harbour. In addition, and a new development for the RNLI, an 95 ft (29 m) Steam Tug was placed at Padstow Harbour, Helen Peele (ON 478), to be used in conjunction with either of the two lifeboats. This vessel was specially designed for the purpose by George Lennox Watson, the consulting Naval Architect of the Institution. The first duty of the new steam tug was to tow the new 42-foot lifeboat to Padstow from Southend-on-Sea.

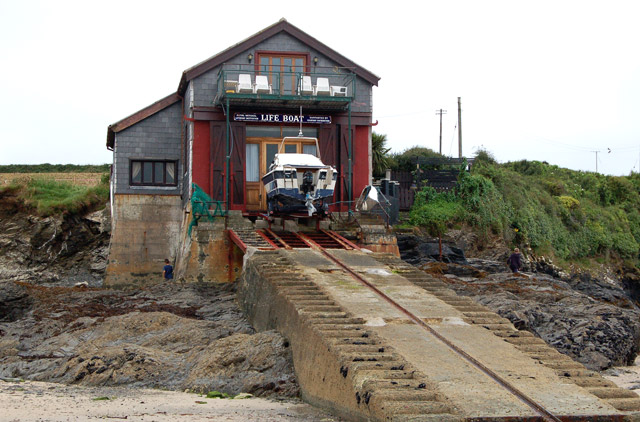
The 1931 boathouse

A new 60-foot Barnett-class lifeboat, the fastest and most powerful lifeboat class in the RNLI fleet, with twin 80-hp 6-cylinder Weyburn CE6 petrol engines, replaced the two lifeboats at Padstow Harbour (Padstow No. 2) in 1929. The Princess Mary (ON 715) cost £14,602, and was the gift of the P&O shipping company. Two years later, the P&S lifeboat at Hawker's Cove was replaced with a 35-foot 6in self-righting motor lifeboat, John and Sarah Eliza Stych (ON 743), costing £3,754. To accommodate the new boat, a new boathouse with slipway was constructed on the southern corner of Hawker's Cove.(50°33′35.4″N 4°56′53.9″W). In 1938, the Padstow No. 1 station at Hawker's Cove was redesignated as Padstow No. 2, with the Padstow No. 2 station at Padstow Harbour redesignated as Padstow No. 1.

=== 1960s onwards ===
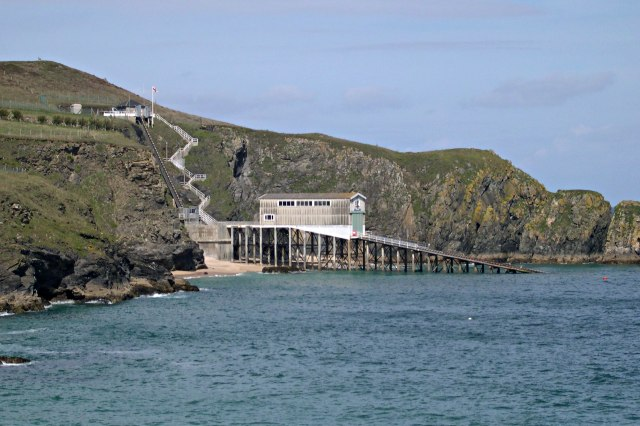
Trevose Head lifeboat station in 2004

Hawker's Cove (Padstow No. 2) lifeboat station was closed on 31 March 1962 due to silt build up, which was also making it increasingly difficult to operate the Padstow Harbour (Padstow No. 1) lifeboat. It was decided to undertake a major civil engineering project, and construct a new station at Trevose Head, 5 miles (8.0 km) to the west of Padstow. Access was provided by a new 0.25 mi (0.40 km) road to the site from the coastguard station, and a new boathouse was constructed on pilings. The 240 ft (73 m) roller slipway had an incline of 1 in 5½, and the whole project, costing £114,000, was completed on 23 October 1967. Composer and conductor Malcolm Arnold wrote the 'Padstow Lifeboat March' to mark the occasion.

In 1984, modifications were carried out to the station to accommodate a Tyne-class lifeboat, including an exhaust ducting system, a new fuel storage tank, and improvements to the cliff lift, but by the early 1990s, serious deterioration of the concrete structure required further maintenance.

Now without a lifeboat on the Camel estuary, any casualties here tended to be dealt with by local boats rather than the RNLI. In 1993, the Padstow Harbour Commissioners asked the RNLI if they could provide an Inshore Lifeboat. One was deployed for evaluation in 1994 from a temporary boathouse on the east side of the estuary, and after successful trials, continues today as Rock Lifeboat Station.

A new boathouse was constructed at Trevose Head, and completed on 6 July 2006, at a cost of £6.829,900. The new 75 m (246 ft) slipway has an incline of 1 in 5. Demolition of the old boathouse cost a further £400,000. On 17 July 2006, a new Tamar-class All-weather lifeboat, 16-04 Spirit of Padstow (ON 1283) was placed on service at Padstow. Primarily funded by Miss M. Allen, the lifeboat cost £2.5million.

== Description ==
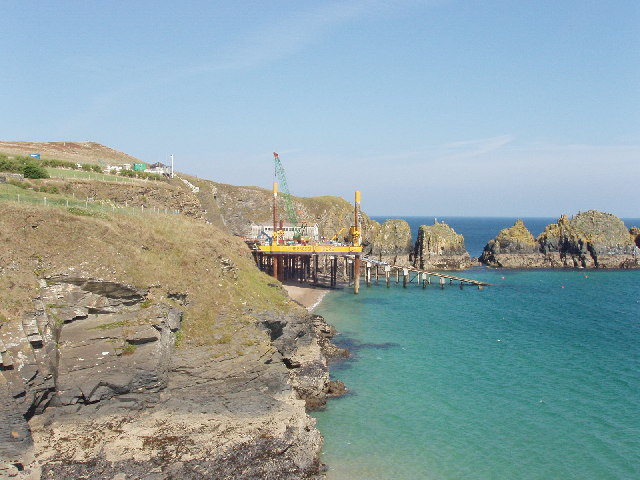
The station construction in 2005

The current lifeboat station was designed by Poynton Bradbury Wynter Cole with Haskoning UK acting as consulting engineers. The building work was contracted to John Martin Construction. Most of the materials arrived by sea and a jack-up barge was used as a work base. The boathouse is elevated above the sea; access from the cliff top is by the steps and hoist that were constructed for the 1967 boathouse. The lifeboat is kept on a tipping cradle so that it can be kept level for maintenance but launched down the 1 in 5, 75 m (246 ft) slipway. The boathouse has a C-shaped profile for the copper exterior which is built on a timber frame. Construction cost £6,829,900.

== Awards ==
After the Harbour Association's lifeboat capsized, Master mariner William Giles took out another boat with seven volunteers, saving four people from the brig Albion, aground on the Doom Bar on 29 November 1833. He was awarded the first silver medal at Padstow. Captain Mitchell Wade was awarded a silver medal for leading a rescue in the Harbour Association lifeboat, saving three men on 30 November 1836, after two vessels collided and ran aground. Another silver medal was awarded to Coastguard Chief Officer Joseph Mortley for his part in using the rocket apparatus to rescue six men from the brig Britannia, aground on the Doom Bar on 31 March 1841. Boat builder Richard Tredwen was awarded a silver medal after leading the rescue of seven men from the brig Towan, which grounded on the Doom Bar on 28 October 1843. Three silver medals were awarded to William Johns, William Dark and William Found for saving 21 people from the Marchioness of Abercorn, when it was wrecked on 8 December 1847 while on passage from Quebec to London.

Daniel Shea was awarded a silver medal for two rescues in one week. Seven people were saved from the Gonsalve of Nantes on 8 March 1859 and another seven from the Frederick William of Ipswich on 15 March 1859. The Emperor of the French awarded silver medals to all of the men involved in the rescue of the Gonsalve. Shea was awarded a silver second-service clasp, after entering the sea on 22 January 1860, attempting to rescue the crew of the James Alexander, aground near Trevose Head, and a silver third-service clasp for service on 29 December 1865. Coxswain William Hills was in charge of the lifeboat on this occasion and was also awarded a silver medal; 17 men being saved from the Juliet of Greenock. William Hills was given a second-service clasp in 1870, for his "long and gallant services" at Padstow. William Webb was given a silver medal in 1883 to mark his retirement after 13 years as lifeboat coxswain.

The first silver medal at Padstow in the twentieth century was awarded to William Baker for leading a double rescue on 12 November 1911. The RNLB Arab (ON 472) was launched when the schooner Island Maid ran aground on the Doom Bar, with six people rescued. The lifeboat immediately put out again to the French ship Angèle, which also struck the Doom Bar. The tired lifeboat crew were unable to reach the grounded vessel, returning to the station for fresh hands. With a new crew now on board, the Arab managed to rescue the ship's captain. William Baker also received a bronze medal for leading the rescue on 11 February 1928, of 18 men from the SS Taormina, despite sea conditions making it difficult to get past the Doom Bar. On 27 November 1928 the RNLI's steam tug Helen Peele located missing fishing boat, Our Girlie of Port Isaac near Port Quin. Five crew were rescued, for which Capt. Joseph Atkinson was awarded a bronze medal.

William Orchard took the RLNB Princess Mary (ON 715) into heavy surf on 23 November 1944 to save seven people from the steamer Sjofna. He was awarded the RNLI silver medal, along with the Maud Smith award, for the bravest act of life-saving by a lifeboat man that year. John Murt was given a silver medal for rescuing 10 from the Kedah on 12 August 1946, after seven hours at sea in 'almost impossible conditions', during which the lifeboat was damaged. The final medal service from Padstow Harbour was made on 23 November 1965. Coxswain Gordon Elliott of the RNLB Joseph Hiram Chadwick was awarded the silver medal, for saving the two crew of the fishing boat Deo Gratias after it lost its rudder in a storm.

The RNLB James and Catherine Macfarlane (ON 989) launched from Trevose Head late at night on 7 December 1975 after flares were seen. A storm was blowing and large waves broke across the lifeboat, smashing the windscreen and injuring several of the crew. A special 'Framed 'Certificate of Thanks' was presented to the coxswain and crew. The lifeboat was launched on 17 July 1977 and saved two people and a dog from the yacht Calcutta Princess. Anthony Warnock and Trevor England were awarded silver medals for this difficult rescue, which was performed dangerously close to rocks at Dinas Head. A silver second-service clasp was awarded to Trevor England when the lifeboat attended the Greek cargo ship Skopelos Sky which was being blown ashore at Port Quin in a force 10 storm on 15 December 1979. The 'Thanks of the Institution Inscribed on Vellum' was presented to all the crew members, and this was extended to the shore crew, who had the difficult task of rehousing the lifeboat, when it returned to Trevose Head that evening, when the storm was still making huge waves at the bottom of the slipway.

A 'Framed Letter of Thanks signed by the Chairman' was sent to the crew after the Tyne-class lifeboat James Burrough (ON 1094) stood by the cargo vessel Secil Japan, which had grounded on rocks in Deadman's Cove on 12 March 1989. Heavy seas damaged the lifeboat and it was unable to be taken back into the boathouse until after daybreak.

The Tamar-class lifeboat Spirit of Padstow (ON 1283) was launched at 11:08 on 25 June 2007. The Coresande had suffered damage in a storm. The yacht's crew were lifted off by helicopter and the lifeboat towed the vessel into Padstow harbour. Before it could be rehoused it was diverted to another small boat, the Fly, which was aground near the Doom Bar. After this, the sea conditions were too rough to return to Trevose Head, so the crew moored in Padstow at 23:35. For this lengthy double service, Alan Tarby was presented with 'The Thanks of the Institution Inscribed on Vellum' and Luke Chown and Christopher Murphy, who had gone aboard the Coresande, were given 'Framed Letters of Thanks signed by the Chairman of the Institution'. Alan Tarby received a Framed Letter of Thanks signed by the chairman for a service to a yacht on 29 April 2013.

The following are awards made at Padstow:

- RNIPLS Silver Medal
  William Giles, Master mariner – 1833
  Capt. Mitchell Brown Wade, Master of the brig Dew Drop – 1836
  Joseph Mortley, Chief Officer, HM Coastguard, Padstow – 1841
  Richard Tredwen, Shipbuilder – 1843
  Capt. William Dark, Master of the smack Rose – 1848
  Capt. William Found, Master of the schooner Model – 1848
  Capt. William Johns, Master of the schooner Liberty – 1848
- RNLI Silver Medal
  Daniel Shea, Coxswain – 1859
  Daniel Shea, Coxswain – 1860 (Second-service clasp)
  William Hills, Coxswain – 1866
  Daniel Shea, former coxswain, Chief Officer, HM Coastguard, Padstow – 1866 (Third-service clasp)
  William Hills, Coxswain, Chief Boatman, HM Coastguard, Padstow – 1870 (Second-service clasp)
  William Corkhill, Coxswain – 1872
  William Corkhill, Coxswain – 1875 (Second-service clasp)
  Miss Ellen Frances Prideaux Brune – 1879
  Miss Gertrude Rose Prideaux Brune – 1879
  Miss Mary Katherine Prideaux Brune – 1879
  Miss Beatrice May Prideaux Brune – 1879
  Miss Nora O’Shaughnessy – 1879
  William Webb, Coxswain – 1883
  William Henry Baker, Coxswain – 1911
  William Orchard, Acting Coxswain / Second Motor Mechanic – 1945
  John Tallack Murt, Coxswain – 1946
  Gordon Harvey Elliott, Coxswain – 1966
  Anthony Warnock, Coxswain – 1977
  Trevor England, Second Coxswain/Assistant Mechanic – 1977
  Trevor England, Coxswain – 1980 (Second-service clasp)
- The Maud Smith Award 1945
  (for the bravest act of lifesaving during the year by a member of a lifeboat crew)
  William Orchard – 1945
- London Cornish Association Shield, awarded by The Council of the Gorsedd of Cornwall
  Trevor England, Coxswain – 1980
- Silver Medals, awarded by the Emperor of the French
  Padstow Lifeboat Crew – 1859
- RNLI Bronze Medal
  William John Baker, Coxswain – 1928
  Capt. Joseph Atkinson, Master of the steam tug Helen Peele – 1929
- 'The Thanks of the Institution inscribed on Vellum'
  Hon. John Gage Prendergast Vereker – 1880
  Samuel Bate, former coxswain – 1880
  Padstow lifeboat crew – 1977
  Padstow lifeboat crew – 1980
  Alan Tarby, Coxswain – 2007
- Vellum Service Certificate
  Padstow lifeboat crew – 1966
  Helicopter Winchman – 1980
- 'A Framed Letter of Thanks signed by the Chairman of the Institution'
  Coxswain and crew – 1989
  Luke Chown, crew member – 2007
  Christopher Murphy, crew member – 2007
  Alan Tarby, Coxswain – 2013
  Padstow Lifeboat Station – 2013
- Special framed certificates
  Padstow Lifeboat crew – 1976
- Special Certificate (Fastnet Race)
  Padstow lifeboat station – 1979
- British Empire Medal
  Horace Edward Murt, mechanic – 1988NYH
  Trevor Raymond England, Coxswain – 1992QBH

== Roll of honour ==
In memory of those lost whilst serving at Padstow:

- Lost when the pilot boat capsized, attempting to aid the brig Lord Dupplin2, December 1826.
  John Chapman, pilot
  Henry Trebilcock, pilot
  James Trebilcock, pilot
- Lost when the lifeboat Albert Edward capsized, going to the aid of the Georgiana of Boston, Lincolnshire, 6 February 1867.
  Michael Crannell
  William Intross
  Daniel Shea (42)
  Andrew Truscott (39)
  Thomas Varcoe (38)
- Lost when the Steam-class lifeboat James Stevens No. 4 capsized, heading to the aid of the ketch Peace and Plenty, 11 April 1900
  David Grubb, Coxswain (50)
  John W. Bate, deckhand (25)
  Sydney Emery East, Second fireman (28)
  James Grubb, deckhand (20)
  Edward Kane, deckhand (37)
  John Solomon Martin, First engineer (36)
  James Biddick Old, Second engineer (34)
  Joseph T. Stephens, First fireman (36)
- Died on his way to fire the assembly maroons, 1935
  Thomas B. Cowl, signalman (49)

== Padstow lifeboats ==
=== Hawker's Cove ===
- Padstow No. 1 station (1899–1938)
- Padstow No. 2 station (1938–1962).

Boat kept in a boathouse and launched across the beach.

On station	ON (Note: ON is the RNLI's Official Number of the boat.)	Name	Built	Class (Note: More post-service details can be found on the respective lifeboat class pages.)	Comments
1827–1856	–	Mariners Friend	1827	23-foot Palmer	(Note: 23 ft 0 in (7.01 m) x 6 ft 6 in (1.98 m) (4-oared) Palmer-class non-self-righting (P&S) lifeboat, funded by the RNIPLS and local subscription, designed with Foulerton fittings by David Williams, Inspecting Commander, HM Coastguard, and built by Tredwen of Padstow, costing £50.); Kept on Padstow quay until the boathouse was built at Hawker's Cove.
1856–1864	Pre-306	Albert Edward	1856	30-foot Peake self-righting (P&S)	(Note: 30 ft 0 in (9.14 m) x 6 ft 0 in (1.83 m) (6-oared) Peake-class self-righting (P&S) lifeboat, funded by the RNLI and local subscription, built by Forrestt of Limehouse, London, costing £133.); Transferred to Cemlyn.
1864–1883	Pre-420	Albert Edward	1864	32-foot Prowse self-righting (P&S)	(Note: 32 ft 0 in (9.75 m) x 7 ft 4 in (2.24 m) (10-oared) Prowse-class self-righting (P&S) lifeboat, gift of the City of Bristol LB fund via Capt. R. Tryon, RN, built by Woolfe of Shadwell, London, costing £224.); Capsized 1867. Sold in 1883.
1883–1900	51	Arab	1882	34-foot self-righting (P&S)	(Note: 34 ft 0 in (10.36 m) x 8 ft 0 in (2.44 m) (10-oared) self-righting (P&S) lifeboat, gift of Mr R. A. B. Preston of London, built by Woolfe of Shadwell, London, costing £363.); Wrecked on service, 11 April 1900
1901–1931	472	Arab	1901	36-foot self-righting (P&S)	(Note: 36 ft 0 in (10.97 m) x 8 ft 3 in (2.51 m) (10-oared) self-righting (P&S) lifeboat, gift of Mr R. A. B. Preston of London, built by Roberts of Mevagissey, costing £650.); Sold in 1931. Stored for restoration at Millendreath, Looe, May 2015.
1931–1938	743	John and Sarah Eliza Stych	1931	35-foot 6in self-righting (motor)	Motor lifeboat. Transferred to St Ives.
1938–1939	623	Docea Chapman	1911	34-foot Dungeness (Rubie) self-righting (P&S)	(Note: 34 ft 0 in (10.36 m) x 8 ft 0 in (2.44 m) (10-oared) Dungeness-class (Rubie) self-righting (P&S) lifeboat, legacy of Mr J. Chapman of Grimsby, built by Thames Ironworks of Blackwall, London, costing £830.); Previously at Withernsea and Easington. Sold in 1939. Renamed Kayandem, later Girl Maureen. Displayed as Louisa II at the 'Power of Water' exhibition, Glen Lyn Gorge, Lynmouth, December 2024
1939–1947	738	J. H. W.	1931	35-foot 6in self-righting (motor)	Motor lifeboat. Previously at Lytham St Annes. Sold in 1948. Renamed Follie, later Navette. Last reported on the River Thames in the 1990s.
1947–1951	747	Stanhope Smart	1931	35-foot 6in self-righting (motor)	Motor lifeboat. Previously at Bridlington. Sold to Liberia in 1951
1951–1962	891	Bassett-Green	1951	Liverpool	Motor lifeboat. Transferred to Poole

Pre ON numbers are unofficial numbers used by the Lifeboat Enthusiasts' Society to reference early lifeboats not included on the official RNLI list.

=== Padstow Harbour ===
- Padstow No. 2 station (1899–1938)
- Padstow No. 1 station (1938–1962).

Boat kept afloat on moorings.

On station	ON	Name	Built	Class	Comments
1899–1900	421	James Stevens No. 4	1899	Steam	Wrecked on service, 11 April 1900
1901–1929	475	Edmund Harvey	1900	42-foot self righting (P&S)	(Note: 42 ft 0 in (12.80 m) x 11 ft 6 in (3.51 m) (12-oared) self-righting (P&S) lifeboat, gift of Mrs E. Harvey of London, built by Thames Ironworks of Blackwall, London, costing £1,351.); Sold in 1929. Renamed Trevone, stored for restoration at River Yonne, Migennes, France, December 2024.
1901–1917	478	Helen Peele	1901	Steam Tug	Transferred to the Admiralty, 1917–1919.
1919–1929	478	Helen Peele	1901	Steam Tug	Sold in 1929, last reported as a tender on the River Clyde, March 1964.
1929–1952	715	Princess Mary	1929	60-foot Barnett	Motor lifeboat. Sold in 1952. Renamed Aries. Last reported at Ibiza, October 2022
1952–1967	898	Joseph Hiram Chadwick	1952	52-foot Barnett (Mk. I)	Motor lifeboat. Transferred to Galway Bay

=== Trevose Head ===
On station	ON	Op.No. (Note: Op.No. is the RNLI's Operational Number of the boat carried on the hull.)	Name	Built	Class	Comments
1967–1983	989	48-02	James and Catherine MacFarlane	1967	Oakley	Transferred to Lizard Cadgwith
1983–1984	926	–	Guy and Clare Hunter	1954	46-foot 9in Watson	Temporary lifeboat from September 1983 until July 1984. Transferred to Cromer.
1984	952	–	The Duke of Cornwall (Civil Service No.33)	1960	52-foot Barnett (Mk. II)	Temporary lifeboat from July–December 1984. Returned to the relief fleet.
1984–2006	1094	47-003	James Burrough	1984	Tyne	Transferred to the relief fleet.
2006–	1283	16-04	Spirit of Padstow	2006	Tamar	

== See also ==
- List of RNLI stations
- List of former RNLI stations
- Royal National Lifeboat Institution lifeboats
