= Doom Bar =

Sandbar in the River Camel, England

- Sandbar
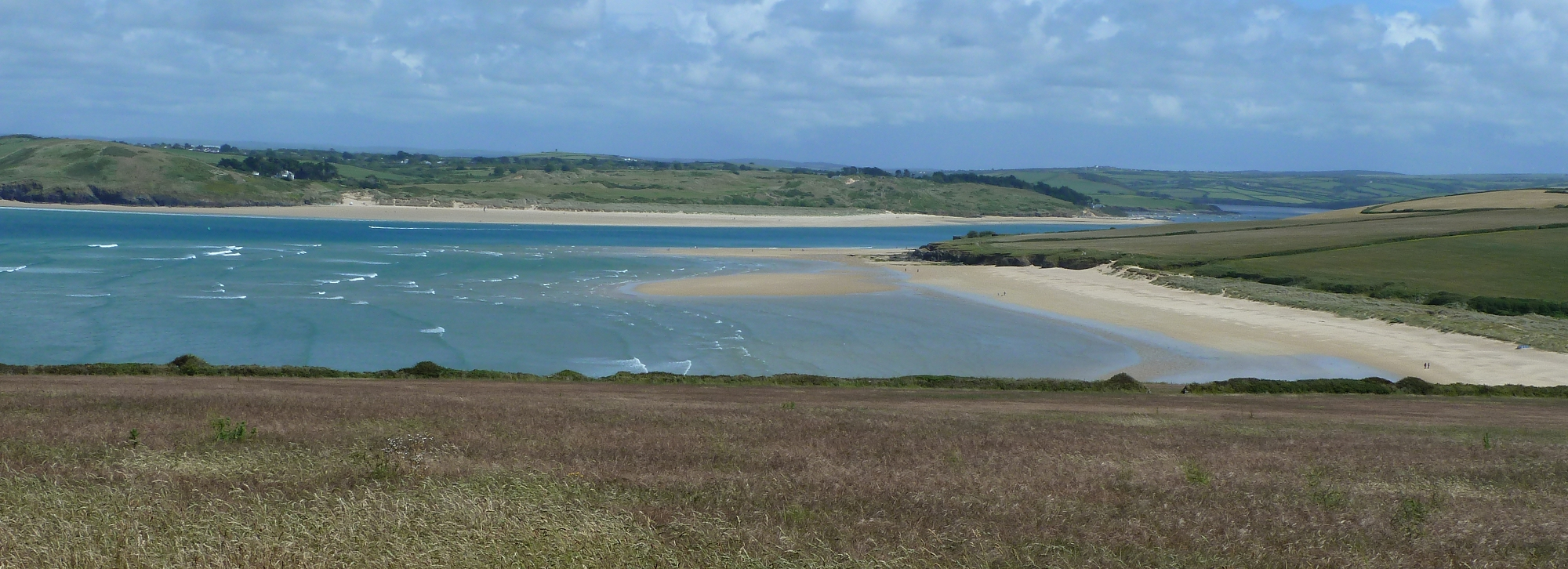
- Waves breaking on the Doom Bar at high water

- Location within Cornwall
- Coordinates: 50°33′45″N 04°56′24″W
- Grid position: SW918777
- Location: Camel Estuary, Cornwall, England
- Formed by: Longshore drift

The Doom Bar (previously known as Dunbar sands, Dune-bar, and similar names) is a sandbar at the mouth of the estuary of the River Camel, where it meets the Atlantic Ocean on the north coast of Cornwall, England. Like two other permanent sandbanks further up the estuary, the Doom Bar is composed mainly of marine sand that is continually being carried up from the seabed. More than 60 per cent of the sand is derived from marine shells, making it an important source of agricultural lime, which has been collected for hundreds of years; an estimated 10 million tons of sand or more has been removed from the estuary since the early nineteenth century, mainly by dredging.

The estuary mouth, exposed to the Atlantic Ocean, is a highly dynamic environment, and the sands have been prone to dramatic shifts during storms. According to tradition, the Doom Bar formed in the reign of Henry VIII, damaging the prosperity of the port of Padstow a mile up the estuary.

Until the twentieth century, access to Padstow's harbour was via a narrow channel between the Doom Bar and the cliffs at Stepper Point, a difficult passage for sailing ships to navigate, especially in north-westerly gales when the cliffs would cut off the wind. Many ships were wrecked on the Doom Bar, despite the installation of mooring rings and capstans on the cliffs and quarrying away part of Stepper Point to improve the wind. In the early twentieth century, the main channel moved away from the cliffs, and continued dredging has made it much safer for boats, but deaths have occurred on the bar as recently as May 2020.

A Cornish legend relates that a mermaid created the bar as a dying curse on the harbour after she was shot by a local man. The Doom Bar has been used in poetry to symbolise feelings of melancholy, and has given its name to the flagship ale from the local Sharp's Brewery.

== Description ==
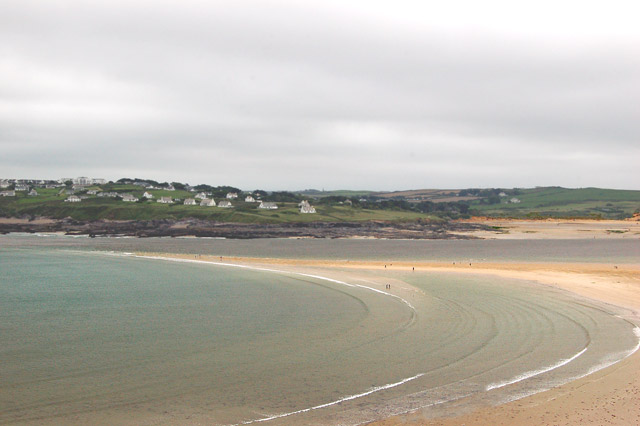
The Doom Bar at low tide, with the river channel on the far side

The Doom Bar is a sandbar at the mouth of the Camel estuary on the north coast of Cornwall. The bar is composed mostly of coarse sediment carried up from the seabed by bed load processes, and it has been shown that there is a net inflow of sediment into the estuary. This inflow is aided by wave and tidal processes, but the exact patterns of sediment transport within the estuary are complex and are not fully understood. There is only a very small sediment contribution from the River Camel itself: most of the river's sediment is deposited much higher up the estuary.

There are three persistent sandbars in the Camel estuary: the Doom Bar; the Town Bar at Padstow, about 1 mile (1.6 km) upstream; and the Halwyn Bank just upstream of Padstow, where the estuary changes direction. All three are of similar composition; a large proportion of their sediment is derived from marine mollusc shells, and as a consequence, it includes a high level of calcium carbonate, measured in 1982 at 62 per cent. The high calcium carbonate content of the sand has meant that it has been used for hundreds of years to improve agricultural soil by liming. This use is known to date back to before 1600. High calcium carbonate levels combined with natural sea salt made the sand valuable to farmers as an alkaline fertiliser when mixed with manure.

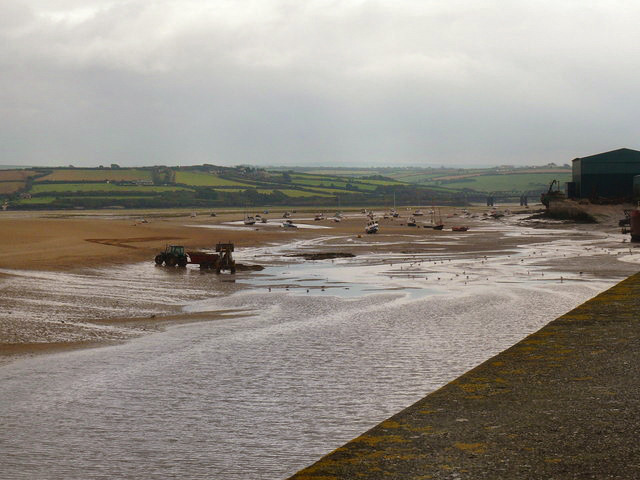
A tractor and trailer dredging sand from the nearby Town Bar

In a report published in 1839, Henry De la Beche estimated that the sand from the Doom Bar accounted for between a fifth and a quarter of the sand used for agriculture in Devon and Cornwall. He also stated that around 80 men were permanently employed to dredge the area from several barges, removing an estimated 100,000 long tons (100,000,000 kg) of sand per year, which he said he had been "assured by competent persons" had caused a reduction in height of the bar of between 6 and 8 feet (180 and 240 cm) in the 50 years before 1836. Another report, published about twenty years earlier by Samuel Drew, stated, however, that although the sandbars had been "pillaged" for ages they remained undiminished. An estimated ten million tons of sediment was removed from the estuary between 1836 and 1989, mostly for agricultural purposes and mostly from the Doom Bar. Sand is still regularly dredged from the area; in 2009 an estimated 120,000 tons of sand were removed from the bar and the surrounding estuary.

There is a submerged forest beneath the eastern part of the Doom Bar, off Daymer Bay. It is believed to be part of the wooded plain that existed off the current Cornwall coast before it was overcome by sand dunes and beach sand during the last significant rise in sea-level, which ended around 4,000 years ago. Exposed as they are to the Atlantic Ocean, the sands of the area have always been prone to sudden shifts: several houses were said to have been buried one night during a powerful storm. According to tradition one such shift led to the formation of the Doom Bar during the reign of Henry VIII (1509–1547), causing a decline in the prosperity of Padstow. Today, the sandbank covers approximately 0.4 square miles (1.0 km^{2}), linking the beaches near Harbour Cove by sand flats, although the actual size and shape vary.

The name "Doom Bar" is a corruption of the older name Dunbar which itself derives from dune-bar. Although the bar was commonly known as "Dunbar sands" before 1900, the name "Doom Bar" was used in 1761 (as "the Doom-bar"), and it was also used in poetry, and in House of Commons papers in the nineteenth century.

== Danger to shipping ==
The Doom Bar moved significantly between 1825 and 2010.

For centuries, the Doom Bar was regarded as a significant danger to ships—to be approached with caution to avoid running aground. When sails were the main source of power, ships coming round Stepper Point would lose the wind, causing loss of steerage, leaving them to drift away from the channel. Sometimes, gusts of wind known colloquially as "flaws" blew over Stepper Point and pushed vessels towards the sandbank. Dropping anchor would not help, as it could not gain a firm hold on the sand. Richard Hellyer, the Sub-Commissioner of Pilotage at Padstow, gave evidence in 1859 that the Doom Bar was regarded as so dangerous that in a storm, vessels would risk being wrecked on the coast rather than negotiate the channel to Padstow harbour.

In 1761 John Griffin published a letter in the London Chronicle recommending methods for entering the Camel estuary during rough weather, particularly while north-northwest winds were blowing and described the bolts and rings he had fixed to the cliffs to assist ships trying to enter the harbour. Mooring rings were still there in 1824, and around 1830, three capstans at the base of the cliffs and bollards along the cliffs, by which means boats could be warped safely past the bar were installed.

In 1846, the Plymouth and Padstow Railway company took an interest in trying to remove the Doom Bar, hoping to increase trade through the harbour at Padstow. The plan was to create a breakwater on the bar, which would stop the build-up of sand, and the railway would transport sand from the nearby dunes to where it was needed for agricultural purposes elsewhere in the south west.

In the event, neither the breakwater nor the railway were built, but the issue was re-examined by the 1858 British Parliamentary Select committee on Harbours for Refuge. The select committee took evidence from many witnesses about harbours all around the country. For Padstow, evidence from Captain Claxton, RN, stated that without the removal of the sand, ships in distress could use the harbour only at high tide. The committee was told by J. D. Bryant, a port commissioner and Receiver of Wreck for Padstow, that in 1848 Padstow Harbour Association had cut down a small piece of Stepper Point, which had given ships about 50 fathoms of extra "fair wind" into the harbour. Bryant recommended further removal of the point which would allow a true wind along the whole channel past the dangerous sandbar.

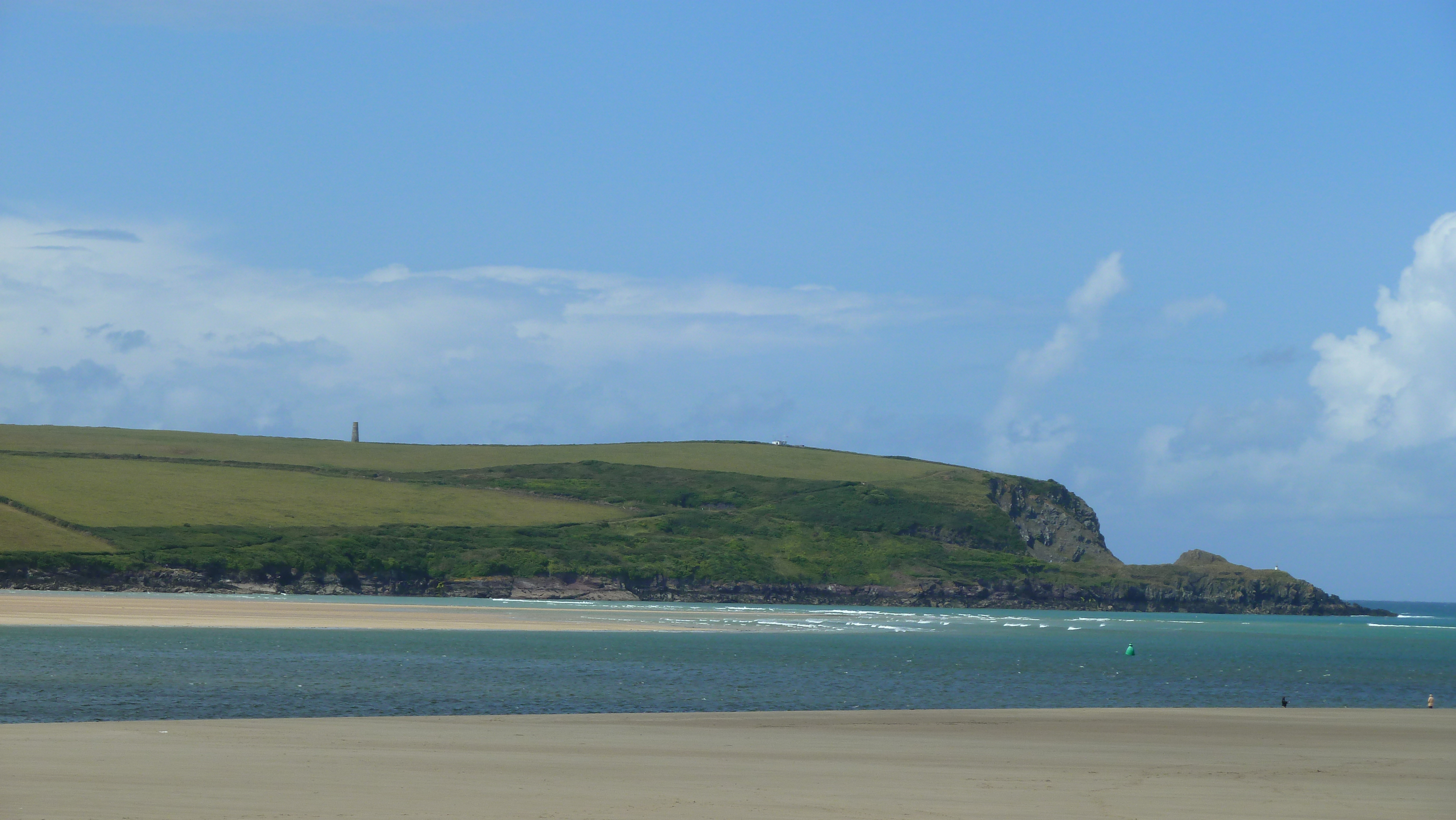
The Doom Bar and Stepper Point from Daymer Bay; the dip caused by rock being removed from Stepper Point is clearly visible.

The select committee report concluded the bar would return through re-silting if it were dredged, and there were insufficient resources to prevent it. Several alternatives were discussed, including the construction of two guide walls to sluice water across the bar, thereby removing it. Evidence was given that the bar was made up of "hard sand" which would prove difficult to remove. During the discussions, it was indicated that whilst the sandbank could be removed by a variety of methods, it would not significantly improve access to the harbour, and that a harbour of refuge would be better on the Welsh coast.

The committee's final report determined that along the whole of the rocky coast between Land's End and Hartland Point, Padstow was the only potentially safe harbour for the coasting trade when the most dangerous north-westerly onshore gales were blowing. It noted that Padstow's safety was compromised by the Doom Bar and by the eddy-forming effect of Stepper Point. The report recommended an initial expenditure of £20,000 to cut down the outer part of Stepper Point, which, in conjunction with the capstans, bollards and mooring rings, would significantly reduce the risk to shipping.

During the twentieth century, the Doom Bar was regularly dredged to improve access to Padstow. By the 1930s, when Commander H. E. Turner surveyed the estuary, there were two channels around the Doom Bar, and it is thought that the main channel may have moved to the east side in 1929. By 2010 the original channel had disappeared. The estuary is regularly dredged by Padstow Harbour Commission's dredgers, Sandsnipe and Mannin.

== Shipwrecks ==
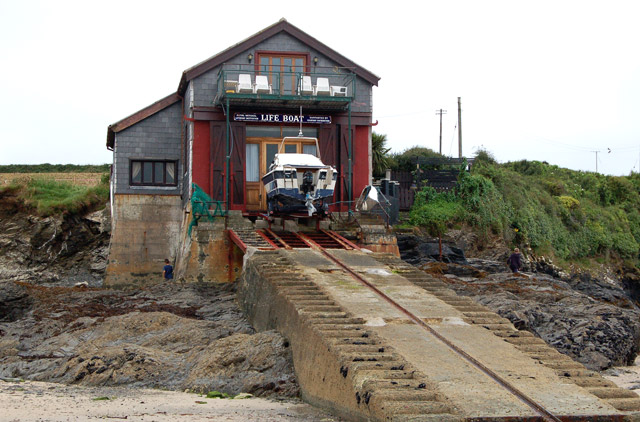
The lifeboat station at Hawker's Cove

The Doom Bar has accounted for more than 600 beachings, capsizes and wrecks since records began early in the nineteenth century, the majority of which are wrecks.

Larger boats entering Padstow were offered assistance, generally by pilots who would wait at Stepper Point when a ship signalled it would be entering. If a boat was foundering, salvors would step in and help. There were cases where salvors attempted to overstate the danger in court, so as to extort more money from the owners. This happened to the brig The Towan in October 1843. Although it did not need assistance, salvors interfered and attempted to claim a large amount in compensation from the owner.

In 1827, the recently founded Life-boat Institution helped fund a permanent lifeboat at Padstow, a 23 feet (7.0 m) rowing boat with four oars. The lifeboat house at Hawker's Cove was erected two years later by the Padstow Harbour Association for the Preservation of Life and Property from Shipwreck. Reverend Charles Prideaux-Brune of Prideaux Place was the patron. In 1879, four of his granddaughters and their friend were rowing on the Doom Bar and saw a craft go down. They rowed out to save the drowning sailor. As it was very unusual for women to rescue men all five girls received a Royal National Lifeboat Institution Silver Medal for their bravery.

Despite the safer eastern channel and improvements in maritime technology, the Royal National Lifeboat Institution still deals with incidents at the Doom Bar. In February 1997, two fishermen who were not wearing lifejackets drowned after their boat capsized. Two anglers had been killed in a similar incident in 1994. On 25 June 2007, the Padstow lifeboat and a rescue helicopter rescued the crews of two yachts in separate incidents from the area.

=== HMS Whiting ===
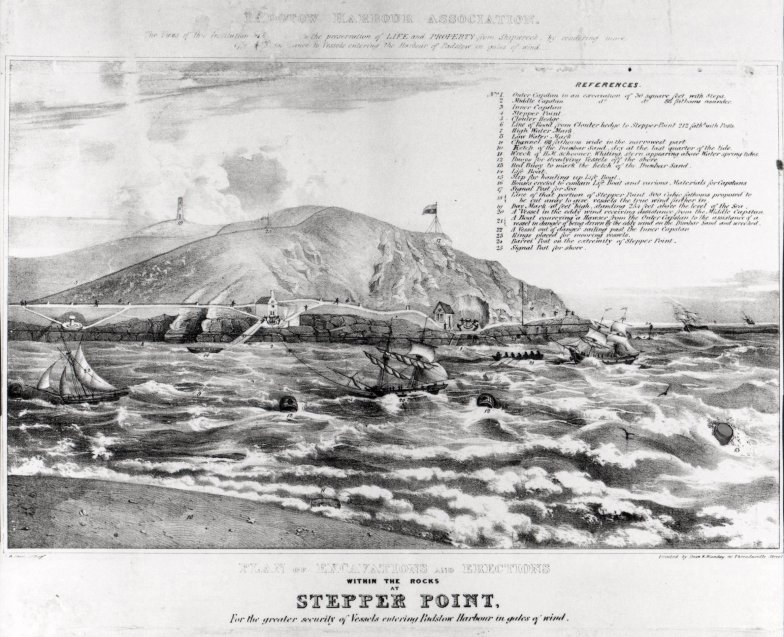
A lithograph of Stepper Point by the Padstow Harbour Association, showing the location of the HMS Whiting wreck

The only warship reported wrecked on the Doom Bar was HMS Whiting, a 12-gun schooner. The Whiting was originally a cargo ship named Arrow, which travelled from the United States to France; she was captured by the Royal Navy on 8 May 1812 and renamed. On 15 September 1816, she ran aground on the Doom Bar as the tide was ebbing and the wind was from an unfavourable direction offering little assistance. According to court-martial transcripts, an attempt to move her was made at the next high tide, but she was taking on water and it was impossible to save her.

Whiting was abandoned over the next few days and the crew salvaged whatever they could. The officer in charge, Lieutenant John Jackson, lost one year's seniority for negligence, and three crewmen were given "50 lashes with nine tails" for desertion. The wreck was sold to salvors and, despite correspondence requesting salvage eleven years later, the navy took no further interest. The Royal Navy attempted to survey the wreck in June 1830, by which time the sandbank had covered most of it. In May 2010 a marine research and exploration group, ProMare, and the Nautical Archaeology Society, with the help of Padstow Primary School, mounted a search for the ship. The groups searched four sites on the Doom Bar, but have so far been unsuccessful.

=== Antoinette ===
The largest ship wrecked on the Doom Bar is believed to be the Antoinette, an 1874 barque of 1,118 tonnes. On New Year's Day 1895, she set sail from Newport in South Wales with a cargo of coal for Brazil, but foundered near Lundy Island, losing parts of her mast. She was towed by a steam tug towards Padstow but struck the Doom Bar and the tow rope either broke, or had to be released. Her crew of fourteen and several men who had attempted to salvage her were rescued by lifeboats from Port Isaac and Padstow, following which she rapidly sank.

Attempts by three tugs from Cardiff to remove the wreck were unsuccessful, but the next spring tide carried the midsection up the estuary onto Town Bar, opposite Padstow, where it was a hazard to shipping. A miner named Pope was called in to remove it: he used gelignite without success, though the explosion was reported to have broken many windows in the town. In 2010 a wreck, identified as almost certainly the Antoinette, surfaced on Town Bar. The Royal Navy Bomb Disposal Unit failed to demolish it and it was marked with a buoy; in March 2011 work started to demolish the remainder of it using saws.

== In literature ==
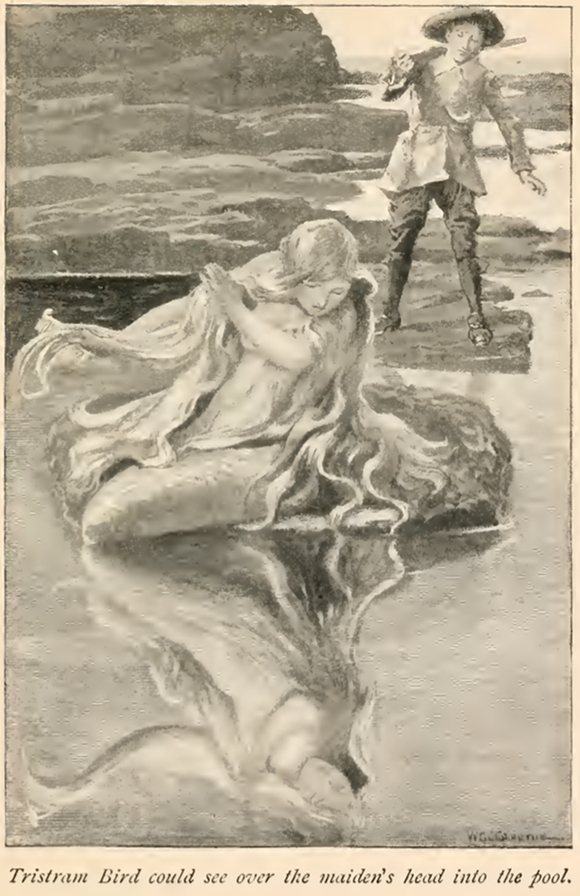
Tristram Bird and the Mermaid of Padstow, from Enys Tregarthen's North Cornwall Fairies and Legends

"[The mermaid legend] is doubtless a myth, but it is a fact that a wailing cry is sometimes heard on the Doombar after a fearful gale and loss of life on that fateful bar, like a woman bewailing the dead."

— Enys Tregarthen's notes on the Doom Bar legend

According to local folklore, the Doom Bar was created by the Mermaid of Padstow as a dying curse after being shot. In 1906, Enys Tregarthen wrote that a Padstow local, Tristram Bird, bought a new gun and wanted to shoot something worthy of it. He went hunting seals at Hawker's Cove but found a young woman sitting on a rock brushing her hair. Entranced by her beauty, he offered to marry her and when she refused he shot her in retaliation, only realising afterwards that she was a mermaid. As she died she cursed the harbour with a "bar of doom", from Hawker's Cove to Trebetherick Bay. A terrible gale blew up that night and when it finally subsided there was the sandbar, "covered with wrecks of ships and bodies of drowned men".

The ballad, The Mermaid of Padstow, tells a similar story of a local named Tom Yeo, who shot the mermaid mistaking her for a seal. John Betjeman, who was well-acquainted with the area, wrote in 1969 that the mermaid met a local man and fell in love with him. When she could no longer bear living without him, she tried to lure him beneath the waves but he escaped by shooting her. In her rage, she threw a handful of sand towards Padstow, around which the sandbank grew. In other versions of the tale, the mermaid sings from the rocks and a youth shoots at her with a crossbow, or a greedy man shoots her with a longbow. Mermaids were believed to sing to their victims so that they could lure adulterers to their deaths.

The mermaid legend extends beyond the creation of the Doom Bar. In 1939 Samuel Williamson declared there are mermaids comparable to Sirens who lie in the shallow waters and draw in ships to be wrecked. In addition, "the distressful cry of a woman bewailing her dead" is said to be heard after a storm where lives are lost on the sandbar.

Rosamund Watson's "Ballad of Pentyre Town" uses the sandbank for imagery to elicit feelings of melancholy when talking of giving up everything for love. A Victorian poem by Alice E. Gillington, "The Doom-Bar", relates the story of a girl who gave an engraved ring to the man she loved before he sailed away across the Doom Bar, breaking her heart. Four years later, when the tide was lower than usual, her friends persuaded her to walk out on the sand where she found the ring inside a scallop. Realising he must have tossed it aside on the night he left, she resolved not to remain heartbroken, but to sail out to sea herself.

A play, The Doom Bar, about smuggling and wrecking was written in the early 1900s by Arthur Hansen Bush. Although there was no interest in London it was well received in America, and was scheduled to tour in Chicago and New York. A series of mishaps, blamed on the legendary wrecker Cruel Coppinger, culminating in a fire at Baltimore, caused the play to be considered cursed by America's actors' unions and its members were banned from appearing in it.

== Sources ==
- Cornwall SMP2: Fal, Camel and Fowey Estuaries (PDF) (Report). Cornwall and the Isles of Scilly Coastal Advisory Group. 1 October 2009. R/3834/1 R.1558. Archived from the original (PDF) on 4 March 2016.
- Johns, Charles; Camidge, Kevin; Northover, Peter (14 March 2011). Wreck of the Barque Antoinette, Camel Estuary, Padstow, Cornwall: Undesignated Site Assessment and Emergency Recording (PDF) (Report). Cornwall Council: Historic Environments Projects. Report ID – 2010R101.
- Noall, Cyril; Farr, Grahame (1964). Wreck and Rescue round the Cornish Coast. Vol. 1: The Story of the North Coast Lifeboats. Truro: D. Bradford Barton. ISBN 978-0-85153-058-1.
- Reports from Commissioners: Harbours of Refuge (Report). London: Her Majesty's Stationery Office. 1859.
- Reports from Committees: Harbours of Refuge (Report). Vol. 17. London: Her Majesty's Stationery Office. 25 February 1858.
