= Easington Lifeboat Station =

Former RNLI lifeboat station in the East Riding of Yorkshire, England

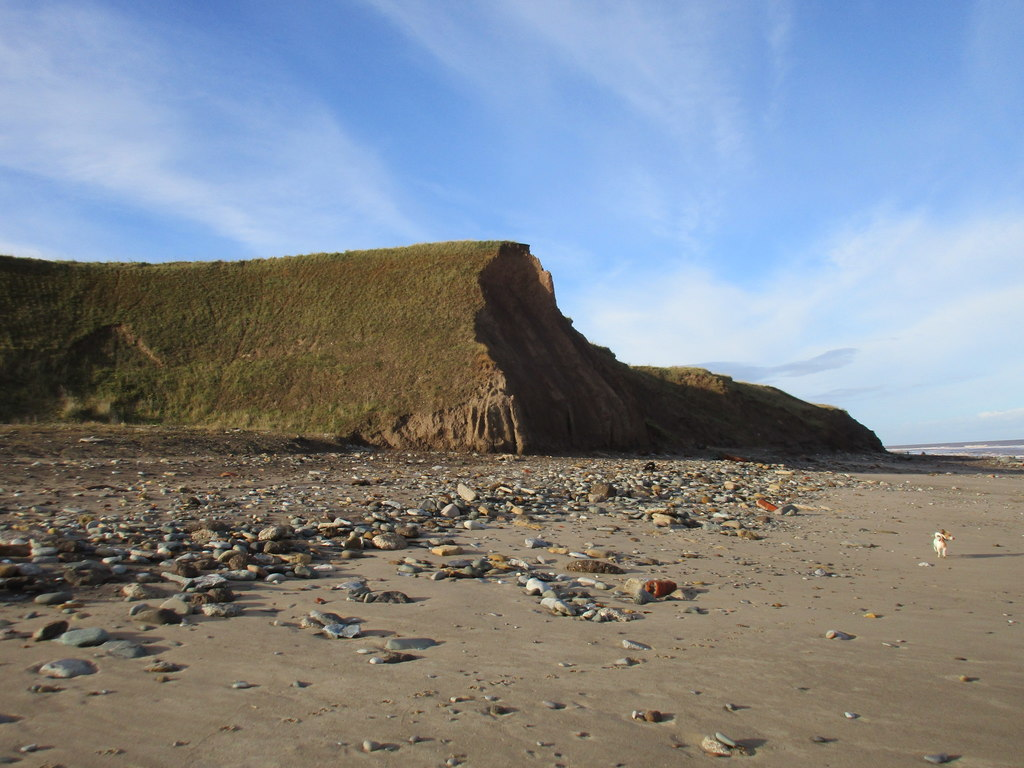
- Cliffs at Easington, East Riding

- Easington, East Riding of Yorkshire

General information
- Status: Closed
- Type: RNLI Lifeboat Station
- Location: Easington, East Riding of Yorkshire, England
- Coordinates: 53°38′46.7″N 0°07′40.8″E
- Opened: 1913
- Closed: 1933

Easington Lifeboat Station was located at the end of Seaside Road, south-east of Easington, a village sitting in the south-east corner of the area of land between the Humber estuary and the North Sea known as Holderness, in the East Riding of Yorkshire.

A lifeboat station was established at Easington in 1913, by the Royal National Lifeboat Institution (RNLI), replacing the station at Withernsea.

After just 20 years in operation, Easington Lifeboat Station closed in 1933.

== History ==
In 1892, work began to construct a lighthouse at Withernsea, in response to the high number of boats that were being wrecked nearby. The 127 feet (39 m) structure was designed by Trinity House, and constructed by Strattens of Edinburgh, being completed in 1894.

At a meeting of the RNLI committee on 8 May 1913, it was decided to temporarily relocate the Withernsea lifeboat to Easington, a distance of about 7 miles (11 km) to the south, as there had been a reduction in calls at Withernsea, and any calls for the lifeboat were often around the Easington area, nearer to the mouth of the busy River Humber.

The lifeboat Docea Chapman (ON 623) had only entered service at Withernsea on 8 December 1911. The 34-foot self-righting 'pulling and sailing' (P&S) lifeboat, one with oars and sails, had been funded from the legacy of Mr. Joseph Chapman of Reigate. On 29 May 1913, the Withernsea lifeboat station was closed, and the lifeboat was relocated a distance of about 8 miles (13 km) to a new station near Easington. Initially the boat was kept at the top of the cliffs, under a tarpaulin, but soon the move was made permanent, and a boathouse was constructed at the end of Seaside Road at a cost of £1,047, which was completed in the spring of 1915.

On 25 January 1921, the Docea Chapman was launched to the aid of the fishing trawler Lt. Generaal Den Beer Portugael (IJM-81) of IJmuiden, which had run aground at Kilnsea. All 11 crewmen were rescued.

Only three weeks later, on 13 February 1921, four of the crew of the steam-trawler Mansfield were rescued by the Easington lifeboat, with the remaining five crew members rescued by the Rocket Brigade.

Easington station would close briefly between October 1927, and January 1928, for the construction of a launchway from the boathouse to the beach. Docea Chapman would be launched only a further four times, each time giving assistance, or standing by. At a meeting of the RNLI management committee on 20 April 1933, it was decided to close Easington Lifeboat Station with immediate effect.

The Docea Chapman (ON 623) was the only lifeboat to serve at Easington. In her 20 years on service at the station, she would be launched 16 times, and save 28 lives. The lifeboat was transferred to the relief fleet, later serving briefly at Padstow (Hawkers Cove). The boat was later named Louisa II, and can be found on display at The Power of Water exhibition at Glen Lyn Gorge, Lynmouth, Devon. All the gear and equipment from the station was sold off at public auction. The station building gradually fell into dereliction, and has since been claimed by coastal erosion.

== Easington lifeboat ==
ON (Note: ON is the RNLI's Official Number of the boat.)	Name	Built	On station	Class	Comments
623	Docea Chapman	1911	1913–1933	34-foot 8in Dungeness Self-righting (P&S)	(Note: 34-foot x 8-foot (10-oared) Dungeness-class (Rubie) self-righting (P&S) lifeboat, legacy of Mr J Chapman of Great Grimsby, built by Thames Ironworks of Blackwall, London, costing £830 when new.); Previously at Withernsea.

== See also ==
- List of RNLI stations
- List of former RNLI stations
- Royal National Lifeboat Institution lifeboats
