= Sharp's Brewery =

British brewery in Cornwall

- Type: Subsidiary
- Industry: Brewing
- Founded: 1994; 32 years ago
- Founder: William "Bill" Sharp
- Headquarters: Rock, Cornwall, England
- Area served: International
- Key people: James Nicholls
- Products: Beer, cider
- Production output: > 100,000 barrels
- Revenue: £16.1m (2010)
- Number of employees: 80
- Parent: Molson Coors
- Website: sharpsbrewery.co.uk

Sharp's Brewery is a British brewery founded in 1994 in St Minver Lowlands, Rock, Cornwall, by Bill Sharp. Since 2011, the brewery has been owned by Molson Coors. It is best known for its flagship ale Doom Bar, named after the notoriously perilous Doom Bar sandbank in north Cornwall.

== History ==
The brewery has been through three phases – from a small micro brewery, to a larger facility within the same building and finally to the current phase that has seen the Brewery extend its premises to accommodate more vessels and increase its brewing capacity.

Unlike many breweries, they do not own or operate any public houses, hotels or restaurants. Their focus is solely on brewing beer. Sharp's also run a joint venture with Paul Ainsworth – the Mariners – in Rock.

On 2 February 2011 the brewery was bought by Molson Coors for £20 million.

On 25 February 2026 it was announced by Molson Coors that the Sharp's brewery in Rock would close at the end of the year due to financial concerns, resulting in the loss of 50 jobs.

== Beers ==
Sharp's produce regular cask ales, seasonal ales, and pasteurised bottled beers.

=== Doom Bar bitter ===
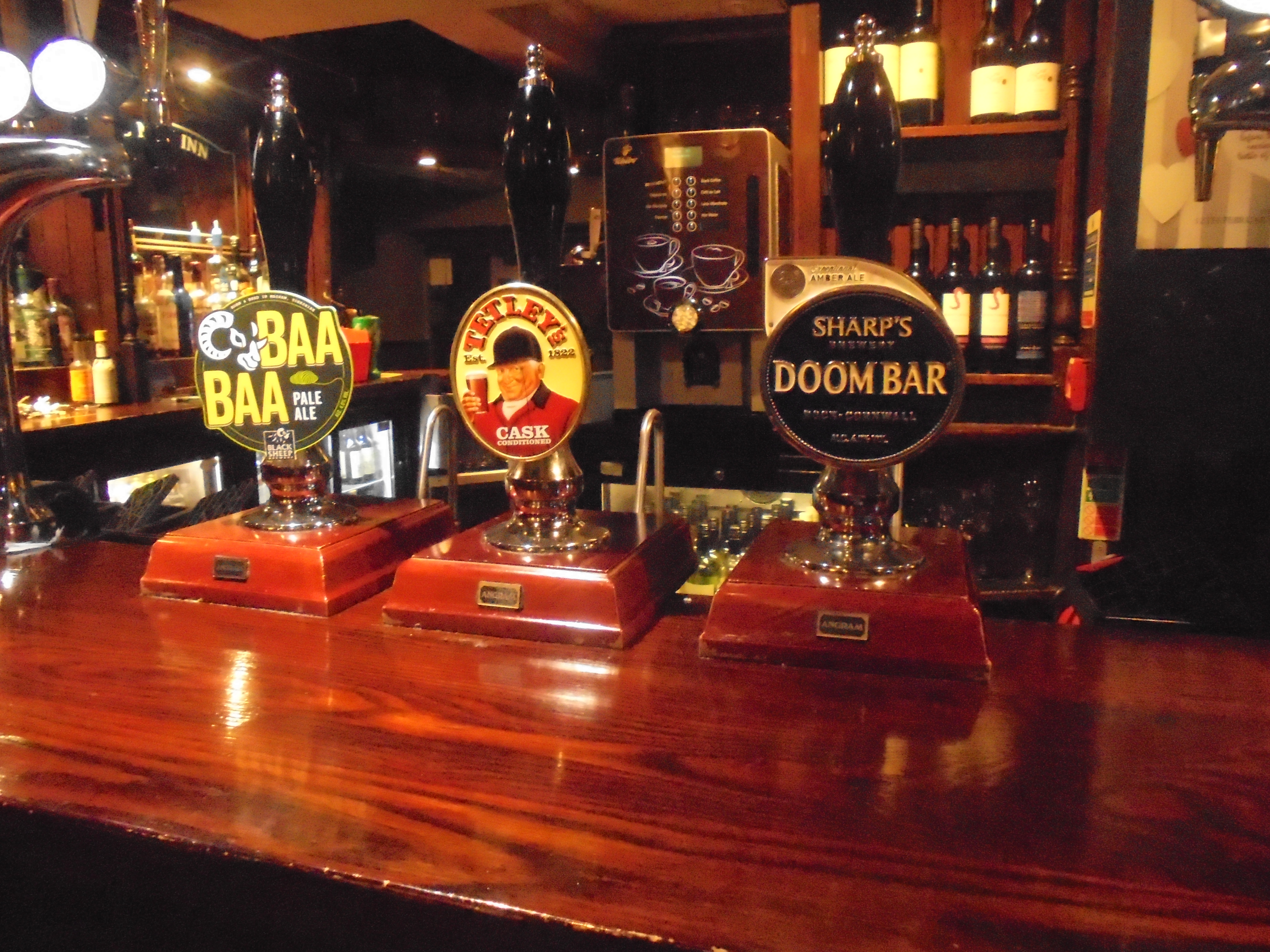
Doom Bar on draught alongside other beers in a pub in Wetherby, West Yorkshire.

Doom Bar bitter (4.0 abv), the brewery's flagship ale, accounts for nearly 90% of sales. Over 24,000,000 imperial pints (14,000 kl) of Doom Bar was produced in 2010. It was the highest selling cask ale in the UK in 2019. The beer is named after the dangerous Doom Bar sandbank at the mouth of the Camel Estuary in north Cornwall. Cask Doom Bar is brewed at Rock, but bottled Doom Bar has been produced, 267 miles (430 km) away, in Burton upon Trent, Staffordshire, since 2013. This ale can now be found across the UK as well as in Italy, Sweden and Japan.

Doom Bar bitter became the first official beer sponsor of the Oxford and Cambridge Boat Race between 2008 and 2012. Securing the "Doom Bar brand" was cited as the reason that Molson Coors spent £20 million on their takeover of Sharp's Brewery in 2011; Doom Bar is now the largest cask ale brand in Molson Coors' portfolio. Doom Bar was awarded an International Beer Challenge World Top 50 Beer award in 2006, and a bronze award in 2011 and 2012. In 2010 it won a bronze in the Publican Licensees Choice Awards. It received a Taste of the West bronze award in 2013, along with a Brussels Beer Challenge (Pale and Amber Ale: Bitter) bronze and a PMA Publican's Choice award for national cask ale brand.

An alcohol-free version, named Doom Bar Zero, was launched in August 2020.

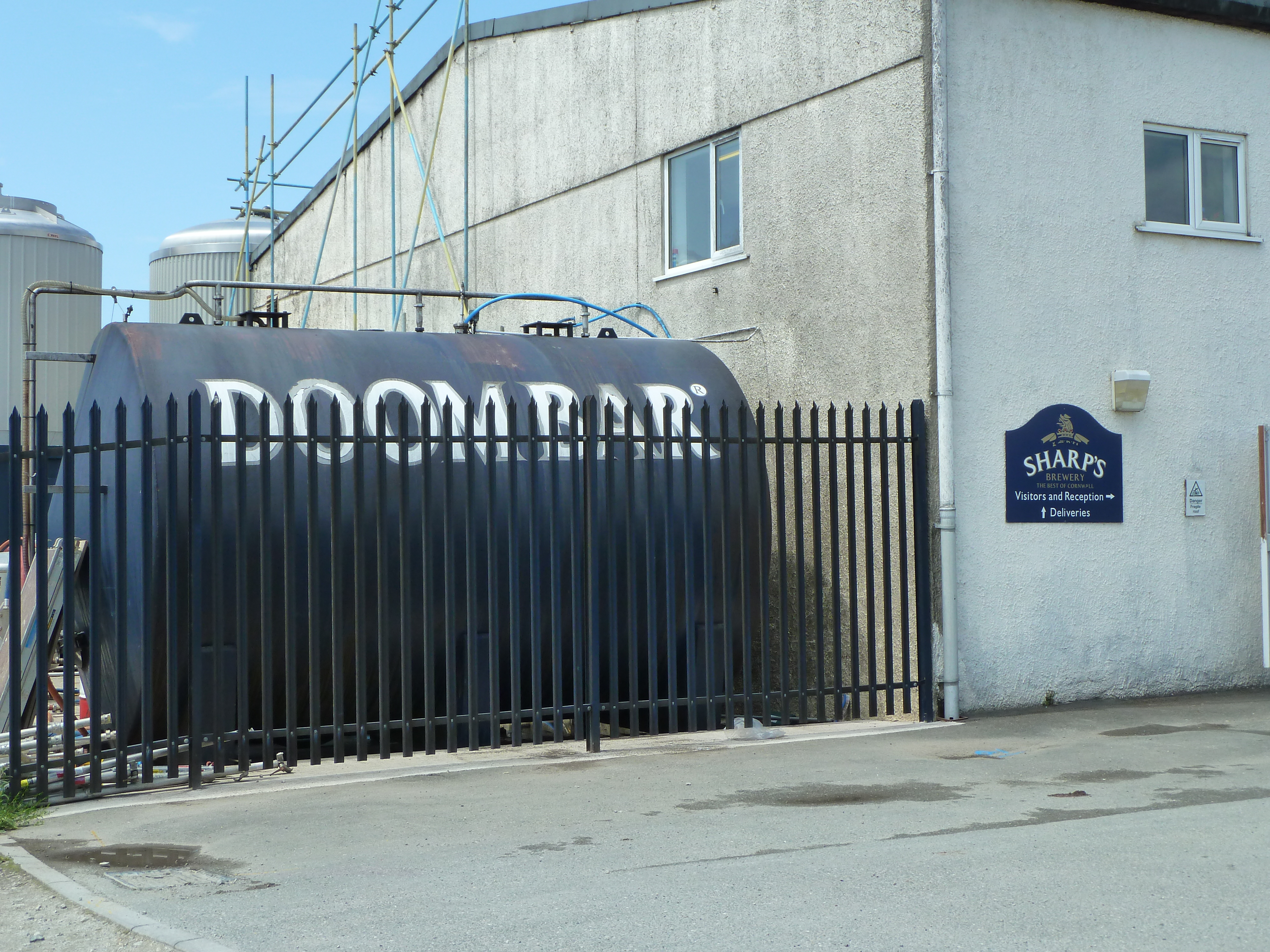
Doom Bar yeast tank at Sharp's Brewery

=== Other ales ===
- Sea Fury (Previously Sharps Special) (5.0% abv) was named 'Beer of the Festival' at Chelmsford.
- Cornish Coaster (3.6% abv) is named after a fishing vessel used by Cornish fishermen in the last century. Coaster is made from an all malt grist, English hops and an open fermentation.
- Sharp's Original (4.4% abv) (occasionally known as Sharp's Own) was the first beer brewed commercially at Sharp's Brewery, gyle no. 00001 in July 1994. Original contains the highest percentage of roasted malted barley of all Sharp's beers and as a result is their darkest brew. The use of special malts gives Own a rich brown colour. Simpson's crystal and roasted malts are used to give caramel and roast notes to the beer.
- Atlantic IPA (4.5% abv) a dry beer available in mini-kegs and polyboxes, from which a percentage of every sale goes to the RNLI

Sharp's also produce four seasonal ales every year, although these change every year.

=== Chalky's ===
Sharp's collaborated with Rick Stein to create two beers after challenges set by Stein.

- Chalky's Bark (4.5% abv) is triple fermented with ginger and continental hops, although this is no longer produced.
- Chalky's Bite (6.8% abv) is created with three hop varieties and wild Cornish fennel.

=== Wolf Rock ===
Wolf Rock (4.8% abv) is a fusion of red ale and IPA styles and combines Noble and New World hops with special malt to deliver its distinctive flavour and red hue.

==== Awards ====
- Brussels Beer Challenge Silver 2014
- International Beer Challenge (Tasting) Silver 2016
- International Beer Challenge Silver 2016

== Cornish Pilsner ==
Sharps' Pilsner is brewed with Pilsner malts and Czech lager yeast and Saaz hops. Pilsner is a pale straw beer.

=== Awards ===
- International Beer Challenge (Tasting) Bronze 2016
- International Beer Challenge Bronze 2016
- International Beer Challenge Silver (Tasting) 2013
- International Beer Challenge Silver (Tasting) 2014
- Taste of the West Award Silver 2014
- World Beer Awards Best Pilsner 2013
- World Beer Cup Bronze 2014
- World's Best Lager at World Beer Awards Gold 2013

== Cider ==
Orchard Cider (4.5% alcohol by volume) was made in collaboration with Cornish Orchards in Duloe. It is now made with Sheppy's Cider, a family-run farm in Somerset, using only West Country cider apples, and matured in traditional oak vats.
