= Prideaux-Brune rescue =

On 9 August 1879, Ellen Frances Prideaux-Brune, Gertrude Rose Prideaux-Brune, Mary Katherine Prideaux-Brune, Beatrice May Prideaux-Brune and Nora O’Shaughnessy were out on a rowing boat trip off Bray Hill, Padstow, Cornwall, when they witnessed a boat being capsized by a squall.

The women's boat was being towed by a fishing boat, under the command of Padstow lifeboat's assistant coxswain. On seeing the accident, Ellen asked for the women's boat to be cast off so they could row through heavy surf to the aid of those overboard.

The women succeeded in pulling a survivor on board. For saving his life, and 'in acknowledgement of their intrepid and prompt services ... at considerable risk of life', they were each awarded the RNLI’s Silver Medal for Gallantry.

Their medals were awarded on 2 October 1879. The RNLI's Thanks of the Institution on Vellum were also awarded to the Hon JGP Vereker and to Padstow lifeboat Coxswain Samuel Bate, who helped save a boy who had also been thrown overboard in the same incident.
