= Stepper Point =

Headland on the coast of north Cornwall, England

Stepper Point Penn Stuppert (Cornish)
- Headland
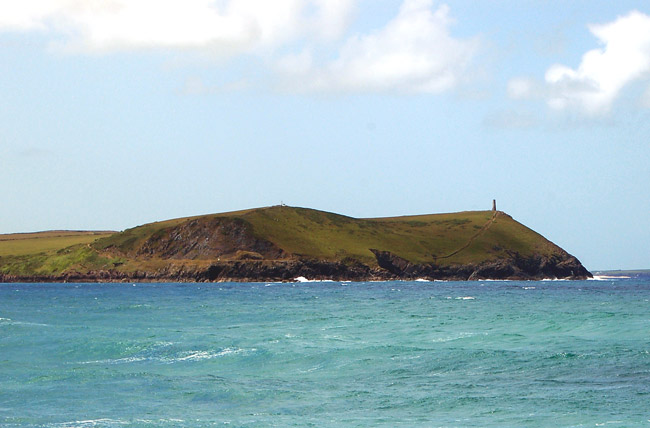
- Stepper Point viewed from the east across the River Camel estuary

- Location within Cornwall
- Coordinates: 50.569°N 4.950°W
- Location: Cornwall

Stepper Point (Cornish: Penn Stuppert) is a headland on the Atlantic coast in north Cornwall, England, United Kingdom. It is at grid reference SW911781. Stepper Point and Pentire Point stand at either side of the mouth of the River Camel; Stepper to the south-west, Pentire to the north-east.

== Geography and Geology ==
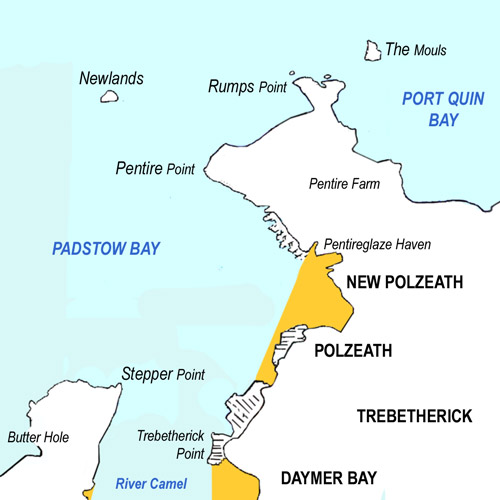
Sketch map showing Stepper Point and the surrounding area

The headland rises to 242 feet (74 m) at its highest point. The land is used for farming and the remains of several defunct stone quarries can be seen. The coast to the east of Stepper Point is on the estuary of the River Camel. This side of the headland boasts the sandhills of Tregirls beach and St George's cove (which is easily accessed from the coast path). A little further north, Harbour Cove and Hawker's Cove (where the Padstow lifeboat was stationed until 1967) are connected at low water by an extensive sandy beach which forms part of a sandbank at the mouth of the estuary known as Doom Bar. Until the 1920s the deep water channel was located close to the headland as far as Harbour Cove, but this has slowly moved so that, by the 1980s the deep channel was on the opposite side of the river nearer to Trebetherick Point.

To the south-west of the headland, the coastal scenery is more rugged with cliffs rising above a rocky foreshore. A mile south of Stepper point is another small headland called Gunver Head and a further mile on is the small sandy beach at Trevone. Offshore is a rocky outcrop known as Gulland, possibly derived from the cornish word goelann meaning gull. The higher ground at the outer end of Stepper Point is made up of Polzeath Slates, with an igneous intrusion that is also the main constituent of Gulland island. Behind this the main part of the headland is Harbour Cove Slates of 260m thickness. Due to its important geological features Stepper Point was designated a Site of Special Scientific Interest in 1990.

== Landmarks and recreation ==
The headland above Stepper Point is topped by a 40 ft (12 m) stone tower built in 1830 as a 'day mark' to serve as a navigation beacon for seafarers during daylight, it is visible from over 30 miles offshore and still referred to as the Daymark. The South West Coast Path closely follows the coastline of the headland and the three-mile (5 km) stretch of coast path from Padstow to Stepper Point has fairly easy gradients and is well-surfaced; beyond Stepper towards Trevone the path becomes rougher and is more sharply graded.

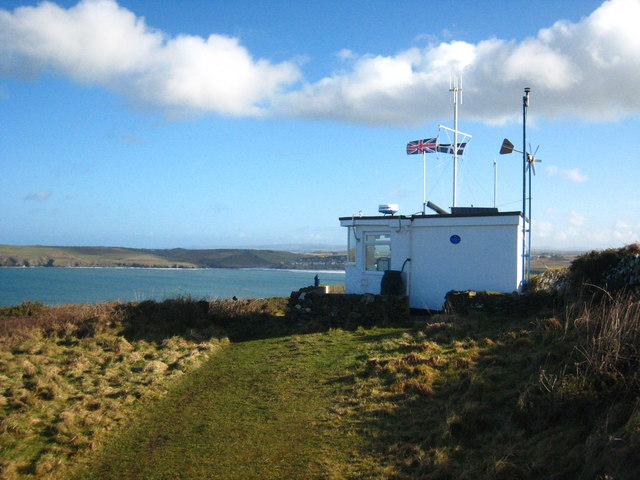
NCI Coastwatch station

The coast path takes walkers directly past both the Daymark and the National Coastwatch Institution lookout which is situated to the north-east of the Daymark. There is no vehicular access to the coastwatch building beyond Lellizzick Farm and the volunteers have to walk the final mile to the watchpoint. The coastwatch station opened in March 2002 and has Declared Facility status meaning that it is part of the official UK Search and Rescue system. All of the staff at the watchpoint are volunteers and keep watch daily from 09.00 until between 15.00 (winter) and 18.00 (summer).

Sightseeing boat tours regularly travel along the coast from the nearby port of Padstow.

== Quarrying and mining ==
One of the most noticeable features of Stepper Point is the quarry on the river side of the headland. The initial quarrying here was carried out by the grandly named Padstow Harbour Association for the Preservation of Life and Property from Shipwreck, who intended to remove a large volume of stone to prevent sailing ships sailing upstream towards Padstow from being becalmed in the lee of the headland. Despite commencing some excavations, the actual amount of stone removed was small compared to the amount intended.

At the end of World War 1 quarrying was recommenced on Stepper by Cornish Road-Metal Ltd who referred to it as Stepper Point Quarry. Some equipment was installed with a crusher to break the stone and a small railway line of 2 ft (610 mm) gauge to convey the stone to a schute which discharged directly into vessels tied up in the channel below the quarry. The railway was operated by a series of small 4-wheeled shunting locomotives, initially second-hand petrol-powered "Simplex" locomotives from Motor Rail, but from 1936 a new diesel-powered locomotive by Ruston & Hornsby was used. During World War 2 stone from here was taken further down the coast and used to construct the runway at RNAS St Merryn, but not long after the war quarrying ceased and in 1948 the diesel locomotive was sold to a quarry in Somerset. Much of the equipment was left to decay until the scrap metal, including one of the petrol locomotives which had been abandoned there, was cut up and removed in 1969.

There have been two active mines on Stepper Point. On the west side of the headland at Gunver Head was a mine variously called Wheal Galway, Trevone Consols, Padstow Consols and Cuddrabridge Mine. Operating for short periods in the 19th century, the mine produced small tonnages of Copper, and also 267 oz (7.6 kg) of Silver. On the east side of the point just upstream of Harbour cove was North Treleaver mine, a small lead mine which followed a lode visible in the cliffs, although the dates of operation are uncertain.

== Gallery of images ==
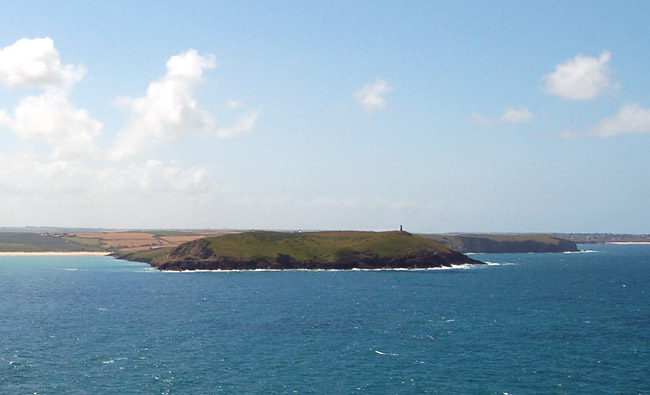
Stepper Point (with Gunver Head to the right) viewed 'end on' from Pentire Point.

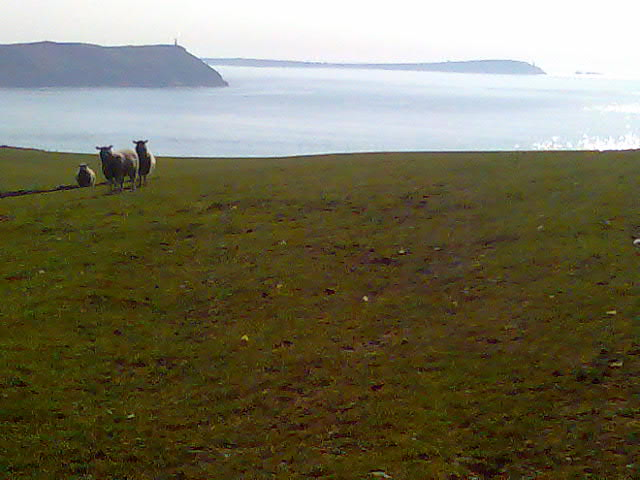
Stepper Point (with Trevose Head in the distance, right), viewed from Pentire Farm.

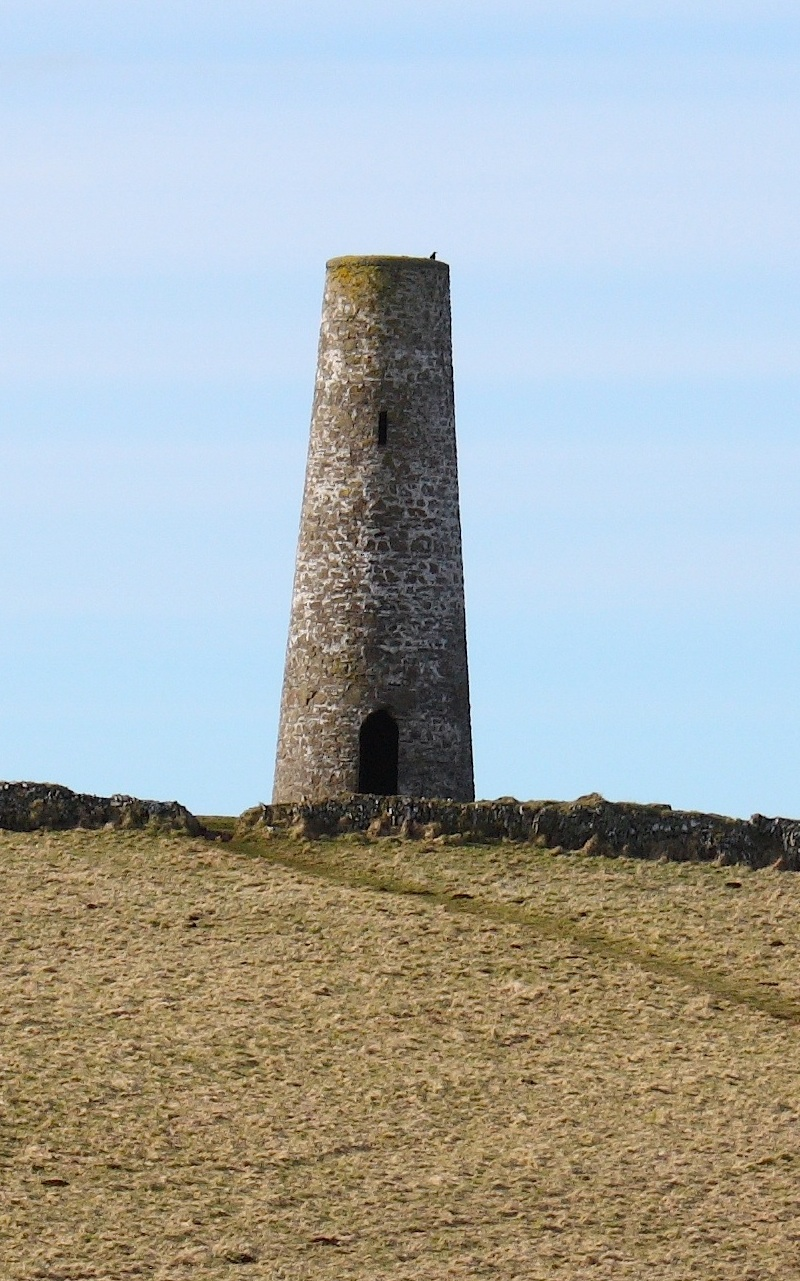
The Daymark.
