= Withernsea Lifeboat Station =

RNLI lifeboat station in the East Riding of Yorkshire

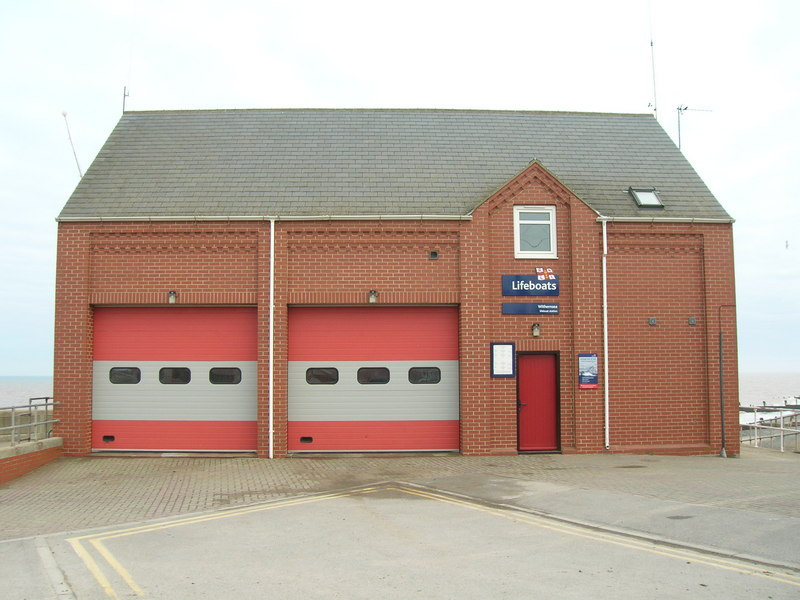
- Withernsea Lifeboat Station

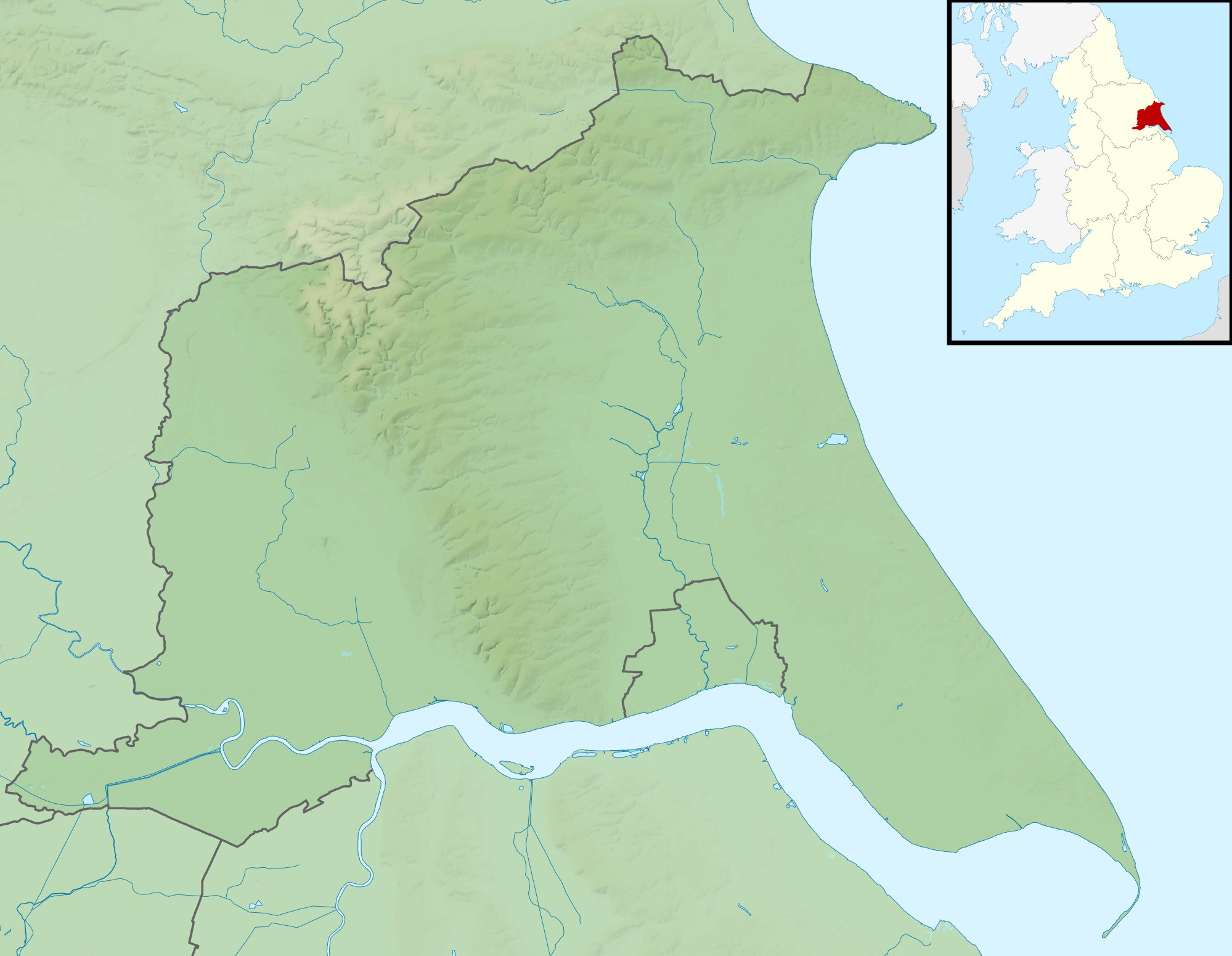
- Location within East Riding of Yorkshire

General information
- Type: RNLI Lifeboat Station
- Location: Southcliff Road, South Promenade, Withernsea, East Riding of Yorkshire, HU19 2HU, England
- Coordinates: 53°43′34.0″N 0°02′26.7″E
- Opened: 1862–1913; ILB 1974–present
- Owner: Royal National Lifeboat Institution

Website
- Withernsea RNLI Lifeboat Station

Withernsea Lifeboat Station is located in the town of Withernsea, East Riding of Yorkshire, England. It is one of four RNLI stations in the East Riding of Yorkshire, with another five in North Yorkshire.

A lifeboat was first stationed at Withernsea in 1862, by the Royal National Lifeboat Institution (RNLI). The station was closed in 1913, when the lifeboat was relocated to Easington. It was reopened as an Inshore lifeboat station in 1974.

The station currently operates a D-class (IB1) Inshore lifeboat Mary Beal (D-837), on station since 2019.

== History ==
In 1862, the RNLI received communications from Mr R. Champney of Hull, indicating that over the previous few years, there had been an average of eight ships wrecked every year, off the coast at Withernsea. A visit was made by Capt. John Ward, Inspector of Lifeboats, who recommended a station be opened. A gift of £300 had been received from Miss Sarah Lechmere of Hanley Castle, Worcestershire, which was appropriated to the station.

A lifeboat house was built in Arthur Street, by Arthur Brown, of Hull, at a cost of £207-15s-0d. A 34-foot lifeboat was ordered from Forresst of Limehouse, at £210-4s-6d, along with a carriage from Robinson, of Kentish Town, costing a further £86. It is estimated that 20,000 people attended the station opening and service of dedication, carried out by the Rev. G. C. Pearce of Hull on 20 August 1862, with the boat being named Pelican.

Six men were rescued by the Withernsea lifeboat on 11 December 1866, from the brig George of Lowestoft, on passage to South Shields. The men had abandoned ship, and were rescued from the ship's boat.

Six of the seven man crew of the brig Tribune were rescued on 16 October 1869, after she ran aground off Withernsea. The vessel was en-route to Sunderland.

On 8 January 1876, the smack Frank of Grimsby, fully laden with her catch of fish, ran aground at Waxholme, 2 miles (3.2 km) north of Withernsea. The lifeboat was transported by carriage up the coast, and then launched to the aid of the vessel, saving all 10 men aboard.

A new boat was placed on service in 1877. A smaller 30-foot self-righting (P&S) lifeboat, she was funded by the 'Victoria Club' in London, and named Admiral Rous, in memory of Admiral Henry John Rous (1795–1877).

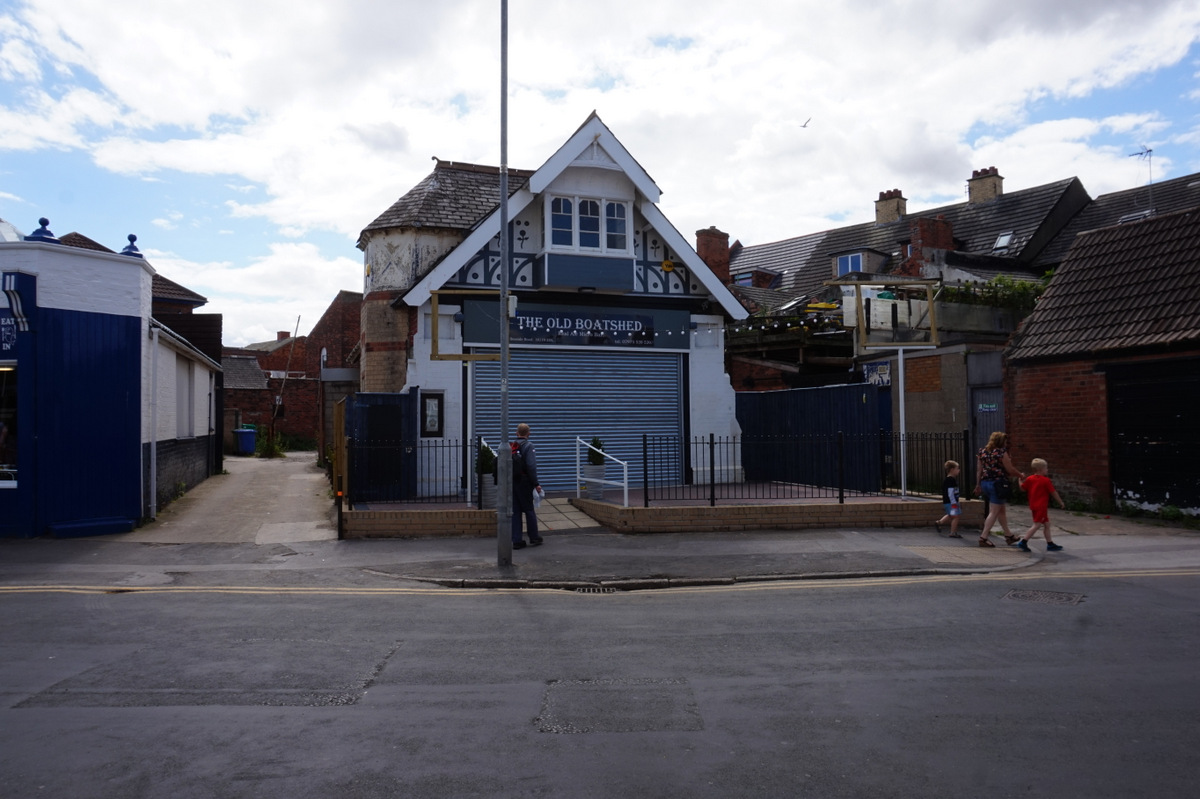
1882 Withernsea lifeboat house

Construction of a new boathouse on Seaside Road was started in 1881, built by R. Carr, at a cost of £412-17s-3d. Completed in 1882, it was again funded by the 'Victoria Club', and still retains the plaque built into the wall.

The building had a 15 feet (4.6 m) high door to get the boat in and out. It was also furnished with a sloping floor which allowed the water to drain away from underneath the boat.

The station was closed in 1913 in favour of a new location at Easington further down the coast. Launching had become difficult at Withernsea since the introduction of new groynes to retain the sand, and most of the wrecks were occurring nearer to Easington. Easington operated for twenty years before it was itself closed.

After a period of 61 years, Withernsea lifeboat station was reopened in 1974 as an Inshore lifeboat station, in response to a national increase in pleasure craft and water-based activities closer to the shoreline.

Since the station re-opened in 1974, members of the team have been awarded eight gallantry awards, including two RNLI Bronze Medals. In 2017, the station had seventeen call-outs. The station is one of four in the East Riding of Yorkshire, with Humber to the south and Bridlington to the north. Currently the Withernsea Lifeboat station operates an Inshore Lifeboat (ILB) with All-Weather Boat coverage being supplied by the two adjacent stations.

The fifth lifeboat house in Withernsea was opened in 1998, on the site of the 1974 building (boathouses had been built in 1861, 1882, 1974, 1983 and 1998). The octagonal lighthouse in the town of Withernsea, is now host to a lighthouse and lifeboat museum.

Withernsea received a new D-class lifeboat in July 2019; named Mary Beal.

== Notable rescues ==
One of the more unusual rescues that the Withernsea Lifeboat crew performed was in January 1989 when the minibus they were travelling in on the M1 motorway was caught up in the Kegworth Air Disaster. The crew assisted with the rescue effort at the roadside.

== Station honours ==
The following are awards made at Withernsea:

- RNLI Bronze Medal
  Graham White, Helm – 1980
  John R. Hartland, Helm – 1991
- The Thanks of the Institution inscribed on Vellum
  Albert Usher, crew member – 1974
  Terence Dawson, crew member – 1974
  Graham Newdick, crew member – 1980
  Leon Wallis, crew member – 1980
  Paul Theobald, crew member – 1991
  Paul Haynes Baker, Deputy Launching Authority, crew member – 1991
- A Special Framed Letter of Thanks signed by the Chairman of the Institution
  for the assistance given at the Kegworth air disaster, while returning home on the M1 motorway from the Earls Court Boat Show.
  Withernsea Lifeboat Station Crew – 1990
- East Riding of Yorkshire council, Chairman's Special Commendation Award
  for the bravery demonstrated under extremely challenging circumstances, in attempting to rescue Grace and Sarah Keeling, 2 January 2026
  Mark Ratcliffe – 2026 (post.)
  Richard Shaw – 2026
  Ellie Procter – 2026
- East Riding of Yorkshire council, Chairman's Special Commendation Award
  for the professionalism, compassion and dedication during the search and rescue operation, 2 January 2026
  Withernsea RNLI – 2026
  Bridlington Coastguard Rescue Team – 2026
  Emergency Services – 2026

== Withernsea lifeboats ==
=== Pulling and Sailing (P&S) lifeboats ===
ON (Note: ON is the RNLI's Official Number of the boat.)	Name	Built	On station	Class	Comments
Pre-398	Pelican	1862	1862–1877	34-foot Peake Self-righting (P&S)	(Note: 34 ft 0 in (10.36 m) x 7 ft 2 in (2.18 m) (12-oared) self-righting (P&S) lifeboat, gift of Miss S. Lechmere of Henley Castle, Worcestershire, built by Forrestt of Limehouse, London, costing £219.)
Pre-622	Admiral Rous	1877	1878–1883	30-foot Prowse Self-righting (P&S)	(Note: 30 ft 0 in (9.14 m) x 8 ft 0 in (2.44 m) (8-oared) Montrose-class (Prowse) self-righting (P&S) lifeboat, gift of the Admiral Rous LB fund, via the Victoria Club, built by Woolfe of Shadwell, London, costing £275.)
258	Admiral Rous	1883	1883–1910	34-foot Self-righting (P&S)	(Note: 34 ft 0 in (10.36 m) x 8 ft 0 in (2.44 m) (10-oared) self-righting (P&S) lifeboat, gift of the Admiral Rous LB fund, via the Victoria Club, built by Woolfe of Shadwell, London, costing £363.)
386	Reserve No. 6A	1895	1910–1911	34-foot Self-righting (P&S)	(Note: 34 ft 0 in (10.36 m) x 8 ft 3 in (2.51 m) (10-oared) self-righting (P&S) lifeboat, gift of Mr T. K. Hardie of Bayswater, built by Woolfe of Shadwell, London, costing £334 when new.); Previously Janet Hoyle at Ayr.
623	Docea Chapman	1911	1911–1913	34-foot Rubie Self-righting (P&S)	(Note: 34-foot x 8-foot (10-oared) Dungeness-class (Rubie) self-righting (P&S) lifeboat, legacy of Mr J. Chapman of Great Grimsby, built by Thames Ironworks of Blackwall, London, costing £830.)

Station closed in 1913, and lifeboat (ON 623) transferred to Easington
Pre ON numbers are unofficial numbers used by the Lifeboat Enthusiasts' Society to reference early lifeboats not included on the official RNLI list.

=== Inshore lifeboats ===
Op. No. (Note: Op. No. is the RNLI's Operational Number of the boat carried on the hull.)	Name	On station	Class	Comments
D-58	Unnamed	1974	D-class (RFD PB16)	Previously at Skegness for seven years.
D-108	Unnamed	1975	D-class (RFD PB16)	
D-227	Unnamed	1976–1982	D-class (Zodiac III)	
D-289	Unnamed	1983–1990	D-class (Zodiac III)	
D-394	Banks' Staff II	1990–1999	D-class (EA16)	
D-541	Brian and Margaret Wiggins	1999–2009	D-class (EA16)	
D-701	Henley Eight	2009–2019	D-class (IB1)	
D-837	Mary Beal	2019–	D-class (IB1)	

== See also ==
- List of RNLI stations
- List of former RNLI stations
- Royal National Lifeboat Institution lifeboats
