= Crugmeer =

Coordinates: 50.5505°N 4.9643°W

Crugmeer: Cornish: Krugmeur
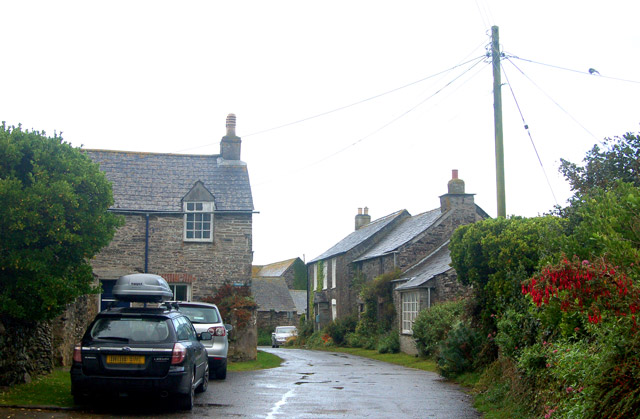
- Looking east in Crugmeer, Cornwall

- Location within Cornwall
- OS grid reference: SW901765
- Civil parish: Padstow
- Unitary authority: Cornwall
- Ceremonial county: Cornwall
- Region: South West
- Country: England
- Sovereign state: United Kingdom
- Post town: PADSTOW
- Postcode district: PL28
- Dialling code: 01841
- Police: Devon and Cornwall
- Fire: Cornwall
- Ambulance: South Western
- UK Parliament: North Cornwall

Crugmeer (Cornish: Krugmeur, meaning great barrow) is a hamlet in north Cornwall, England, United Kingdom. It is situated one-and-a-half miles (2 kilometres) from Padstow to the west of the River Camel estuary.

The hamlet consists of half-a-dozen houses and a farm at the junction of two lanes. One lane gives access to Crugmeer from the Padstow-St Merryn road then continues northeast to Lellizzick, Hawker's Cove and Stepper Point. The other lane leads west from Crugmeer to Trevone beach.

Crugmeer lies within the Cornwall Area of Outstanding Natural Beauty (AONB). Almost a third of Cornwall has AONB designation, with the same status and protection as a National Park.

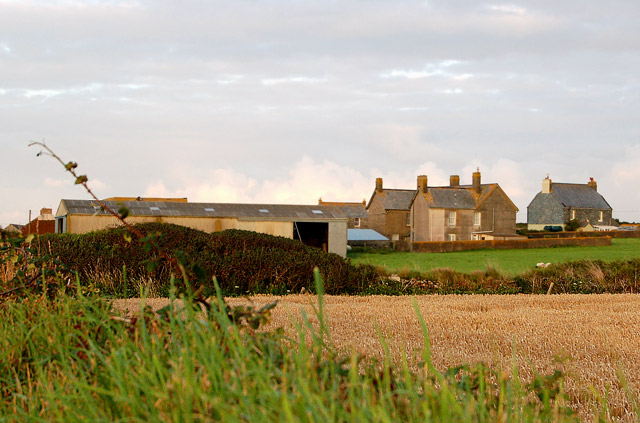
Looking west towards Crugmeer Farm

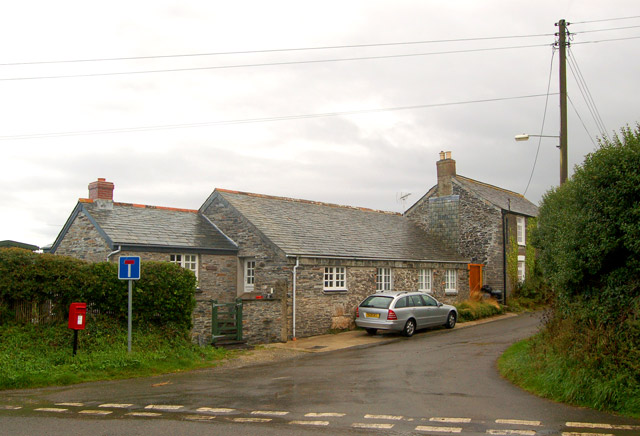
Crugmeer village centre, Cornwall, in 2008
