= Winthorpe =

Winthorpe may refer to:

- Winthorpe, Lincolnshire, England
- Winthorpe, Nottinghamshire, England
