= William Henry Ansell =

British architect and engraver (1872–1959)

William Henry Ansell CBE
- Born: 23 November 1872; Nottingham, Nottinghamshire, England
- Died: 11 February 1959 (aged 86); West Ham, London, England
- Occupations: architect and engraver

William Henry Ansell CBE MC FRIBA FSA (23 November 1872 – 11 February 1959) was a British architect and engraver.

Ansell was President of the Royal Institute of British Architects from 1940 to 1943, throughout the period of the Blitz.

== Life ==
Ansell was born in Nottingham in 1872, the son of Henry George and Catherine Ansell. His father was a grocer, and Ansell was educated at Derby School. He was articled to a firm of architects in Derby and began an architectural practice with Arthur Bailey in London in the year 1900. In 1902, he married Florence Leman, of Chipping Norton. As well as designing buildings, Ansell was also an etcher of architectural subjects.

In 1914 Ansell designed a new Temple of Humanity for the Positivists at Upper Parliament Street, Liverpool, built in brick with patterns in tiles. It has a five-bay nave with narrow aisles, a chancel with a canted apse, and a projecting organ loft. The clerestory has Diocletian windows and there is a baldachino with Byzantine columns. Now a Grade II listed building, in 2012 it was in use by the Church of Christ, Scientist.

Ansell saw active service as an officer in the Royal Engineers between October 1915 and 1918, during the First World War, receiving the Military Cross and twice being mentioned in despatches.

After the War, Ansell returned to his profession. Although not showing notable originality, he designed elegant buildings with modest dignity, specializing in hospitals and convalescent homes. In 1928 he was elected as President of the Architectural Association School of Architecture. He chaired the Board of Architectural Education from 1931 to 1933, then was Vice-President of the Royal Institute of British Architects, 1933 to 1935, and finally was elected President of RIBA in 1940, continuing until 1943. He led his profession through the most difficult years of the Second World War and was unanimously elected as President for a third year, which had only rarely happened before. He also served as Vice-Chairman of the National Buildings Record, a body created in 1940 to record significant buildings threatened by enemy bombing. In 1944 he was elected as the Master of the Art Workers' Guild.

Ansell’s office was at 12 Gray's Inn Square, Gray's Inn, in the City of London, while his private address in the 1950s was Little Paddock, Seal, Sevenoaks. He was a member of the Athenæum Club.

Ansell married Florence Leman in 1902, and she died before him in 1946. When Ansell died on 11 February 1959, he was still living at Seal and left an estate valued at £35,508.

== Work ==
Ansell's designs for buildings constructed include:

- Hospitals: Westbury, Sevenoaks
- Country houses in Surrey, Derbyshire, and Devon
- Churches in Liverpool, London, and Suffolk
- New head office for the National Deposit Friendly Society, London
- New head Office for the Butchers' Charitable Institution, Hounslow
- Convalescent Homes at Skegness (later Skegness Town Hall), St Margaret's Bay, Everleigh, and Banstead, Surrey
- Sanatorium at Gresham's School, Holt, Norfolk

== Honours ==
- Commander of the Order of the British Empire, 1955
- Honorary ARE, United States
- Member of Master Art Workers Guild, 1944
