= Arthur Bailey (architect) =

British architect (1903–1979)

Arthur Bailey (1903-1979) was a British architect known for his work on churches and their reconstruction after World War II. He formed a partnership with William Henry Ansell.

His work includes:

- Restoration of the Dutch Church, Austin Friars, London
- Restoration of St George's in the East, London
- Holy Trinity, Twydall, Medway
