= Skegness Town Hall =

Municipal building in Skegness, Lincolnshire, England

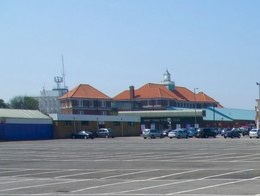
- The building in 2008

- Shown in Lincolnshire
- 53.1495°N 0.3452°E
- Location: North Parade, Skegness

History
- Built: 1926

Site notes
- Architect: William Henry Ansell
- Architectural style: Neo-Georgian style

Listed Building – Grade II
- Official name: Former Skegness Convalescent Home
- Designated: 16 March 2021
- Reference no.: 1474562

Skegness Town Hall is a municipal building on North Parade in Skegness, a town in Lincolnshire in England. The building, which served as a convalescent home before being converted for municipal use, is a Grade II listed building.

== History ==
Following significant population growth in the late 19th century, largely associated with its status as a seaside resort, the town appointed a local board of health in 1885. Skegness became an urban district in 1894, and meetings were held at 23 Algitha Road until 1920, when the authority purchased the Earl of Scarbrough's estate office at Roman Bank for £3,000 and used it as offices. This building burned down on 11 January 1928 and a new town hall, built on the site of the burnt-out offices, opened in 1931. It was later extended.

The building in North Parade was commissioned as a convalescent home for the National Deposit Friendly Society, intended as a memorial to society members who had died in the First World War. It was designed by William Henry Ansell in the Neo-Georgian style, built in red brick with ashlar stone dressings and was opened by Princess Marie Louise of Schleswig-Holstein, assisted by the future Prime Minister, Neville Chamberlain, and blessed by the Bishop of Sheffield, Leonard Burrows, in May 1927.

In the early 1960s, the district council acquired the former convalescent home and converted it for municipal use. It was opened by Princess Anne as Skegness Town Hall in 1964. A western extension was added later. The building continued to serve as the council meeting place and remained the headquarters of the enlarged East Lindsey Council when it was formed in 1974. It also became the headquarters of Skegness Town Council. However, the building ceased to be the local seat of government when East Lindsey Council moved to new premises at Mareham Road in Horncastle in January 2023, and sold the building in Skegness to a local developer. In April 2023, the new owner submitted an application to convert it into a 57-bed hotel.

== Architecture ==
The building is constructed of brick, with ashlar stone dressings, and a pantile roof. It is in the Neo-Georgian style, and consists of a three-storey main block, with three-storey cross wings at each end. Either side, are two-storey linking ranges, with three-storey pavilions either side of these. The design of the main block involves a symmetrical main frontage of seven bays facing south towards the garden with the end bays projected forward. The central section of five bays features a loggia infilled with pairs of French windows. The parapet over the loggia creates a balcony on the first floor, which is fenestrated by a central bay window and four pairs of sash windows. The second floor is fenestrated by five pairs of sash windows, while the end bays are fenestrated by heavily canted bay windows on the ground floor and by sash windows on the upper floors. The building was grade II listed in 2021.
