= The Village Church Farm =

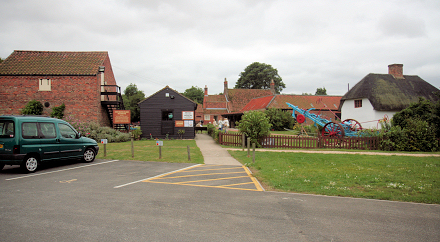
- The Village Church Farm

- Location within Lincolnshire
- Former name: Church Farm Museum
- Established: 1976
- Location: Skegness, Lincolnshire, England
- Coordinates: 53°08′46″N 0°19′34″E
- Type: Open-air museum
- Website: www.churchfarmvillage.org

The Village Church Farm, formerly known as Church Farm Museum, is an open-air museum of local and agricultural history near Skegness, Lincolnshire, England.

There are a number of traditional indigenous buildings, including a thatched "mud and stud" cottage, moved from the nearby village of Withern, the original 18th-century farmhouse, and a 19th-century stable block and cowshed. The museum holds exhibitions of 19th- and 20th-century farm implements and machinery, and displays about traditional breeds such as the Red Poll cattle, and the Longwool Sheep, although there are no animals on site.

In 2009 the farm won the People's Choice Award at the Lincolnshire Renaissance Heritage Awards.

Following cuts by Lincolnshire County Council, and a fire of the mud and stud cottage, it has been run by a charity and has received help from volunteers.

== See also ==
Gordon Boswell Romany Museum, Spalding
