= Skegness Pier =

Pleasure pier in Lincolnshire, England

Coordinates: 53.145°N 0.346°E

- Skegness Pier in 2026
- Type: Pleasure
- Carries: Pedestrians
- Location: Skegness
- Owner: Mellors Group

Characteristics
- Total length: 387 ft (118 m) (1,844 ft (562 m) 1881–1978)

History
- Designer: Clark and Pickwell
- Opening date: 4 June 1881; 145 years ago
- Listed: Unlisted (previously Grade II)
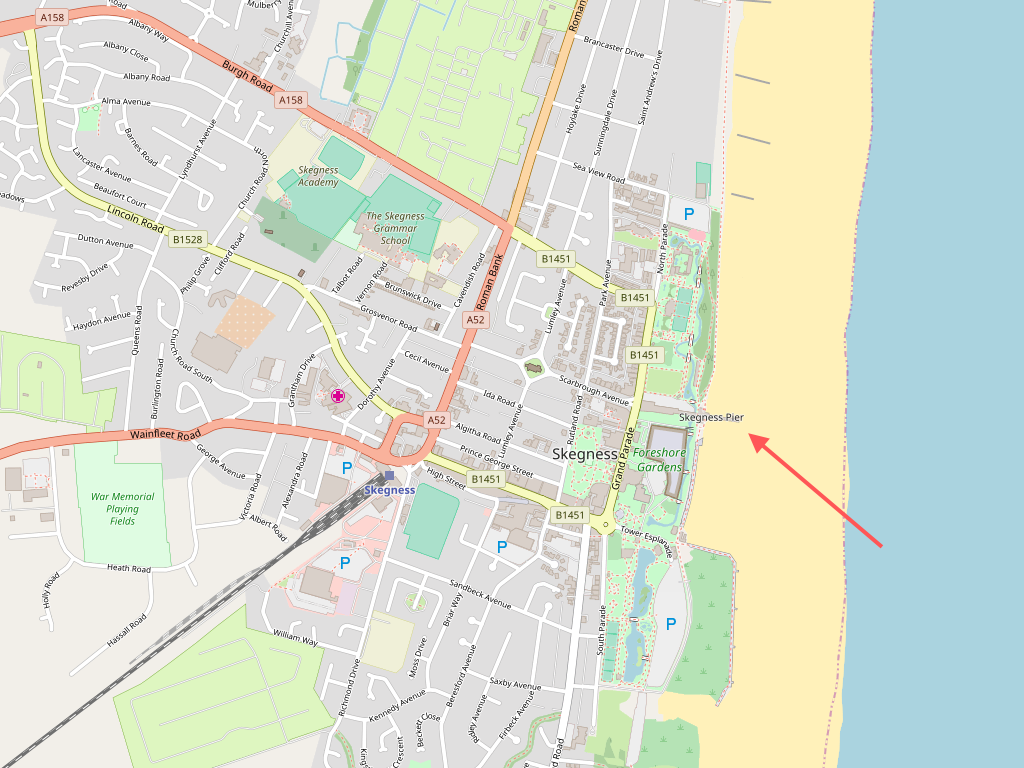
- Map showing location of Skegness Pier
- Skegness Pier

Skegness Pier is a pleasure pier in Skegness, Lincolnshire, England. Opened in June 1881, it was at the time the fourth longest in England, originally stretching a length of 1,844 ft (562 m). When originally built, it was a T-shaped pier with a saloon/concert hall at the pier head. Steamboat trips ran from the pier to Norfolk until 1910.

During World War II, the pier closed in an attempt to prevent enemy invasion. A severe storm in 1978 caused significant damage to the pier, isolating the pier head and shelters which were ultimately demolished in the mid-1980s due to the significant costs of restoration. A part of the pier caught fire whilst demolition was taking place.

The pier has had various renovations in modern times, including redecking and waterproofing, allowing for operation during winter periods and permitting usage during rainy conditions.

New owners acquired the pier in early 2021 and in July announced projections to rebuild the structure to its original length.

== Location ==
Skegness Pier is located on the B1451 Grand Parade Road and is around 0.7 miles (1.1 km) from Skegness railway station. The pier's main building also houses a bowling centre, laser quest and indoor children's play centre.

== History ==
=== Planning ===
Discussions about the possibility of constructing a pier began around November 1877, when a group of local businessmen met in the New Inn to discuss and consider whether Skegness should have a pier. Following approval, the Skegness Pier Company Limited was established to oversee the erection. A national competition was launched for "the best design of a Promenade Pier", with a prize of £50 (equivalent to £5,040 in 2025) for the winner, eventually being won by civil engineers Clarke and Pickwell. The proposal involved a cast-iron pier, 25 feet (7.6 m) wide, with a platform at the pierhead on which a concert hall to seat 700 people would be erected.

=== Construction and opening ===
The pier was authorised by the Skegness Pier Order 1879. With an estimated cost of around £19,000 (equivalent to £2.64 million in 2024), the foundations for the pier were laid in November 1879 with a planned t-shape design, including a concert hall at the head. It opened on Whit Monday on 4 June 1881 by the Duke of Edinburgh Alfred, Duke of Saxe-Coburg and Gotha, at a cost of £20,840 (equivalent to £2.9 million in 2024), and was one of the largest of the 82 piers constructed between 1815 and 1890 around the coastline of Britain. During construction, the Earl of Scarborough Aldred Lumley had taken an interest in the new pier company and by the time of opening, had become a majority shareholder. Shelters were erected along the decking at every few hundred yards. with small kiosks on either side selling seaside food and related items.

=== Early years ===
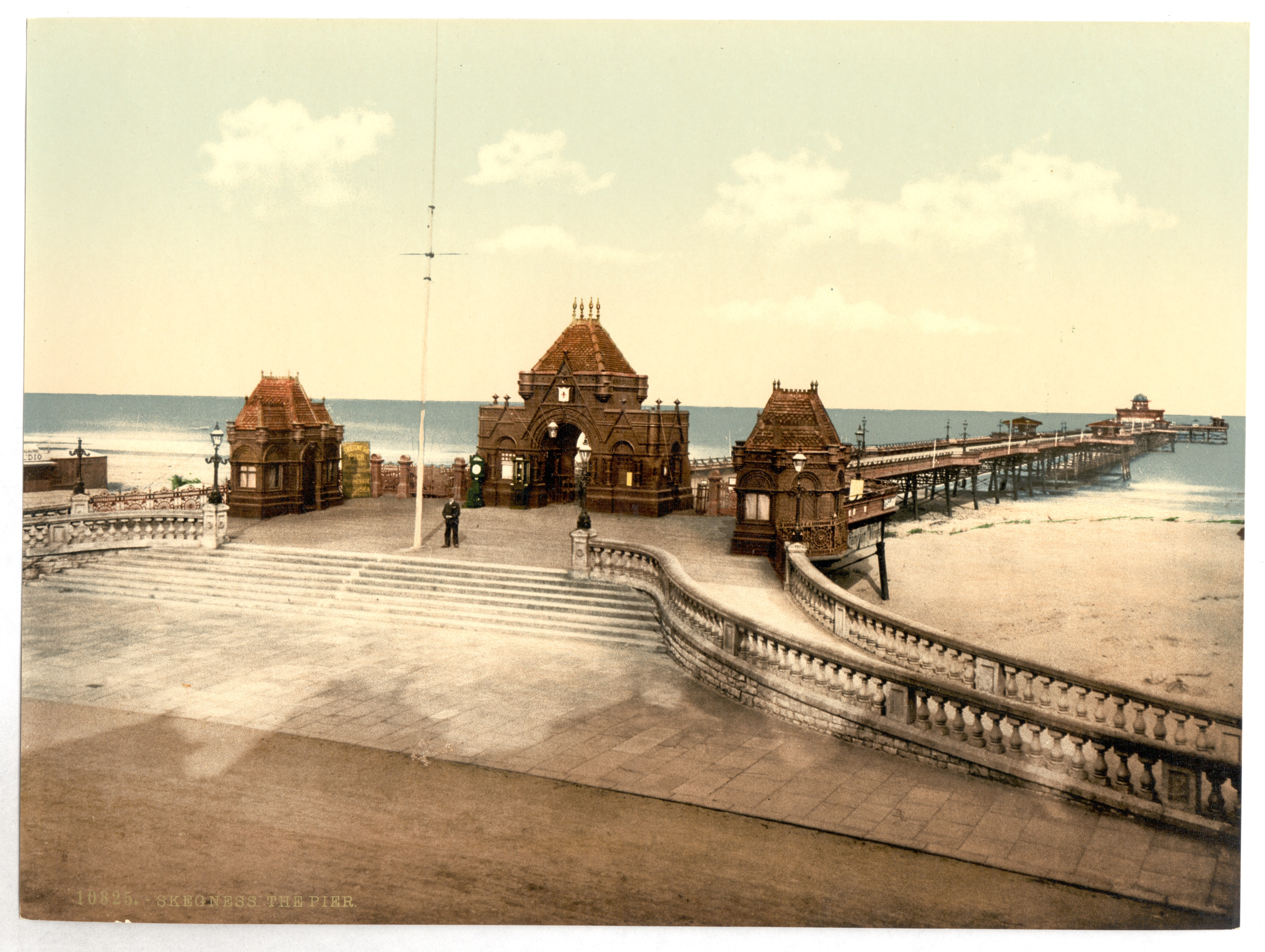
Skegness Pier between 1890 and 1900

Throughout the 1890s, the Skegness Pier Company was recorded over 100,000 annual admissions, managing to carry forward a balance of around £400 each year. By 1899, a Jubilee clock had been erected on the promenade, funded by £600 raised from public subscription costs. A popular boat trip from 1882 was a steamboat service that operated between the pier and The Wash and Hunstanton in Norfolk. Due to the popularity, local businessmen established the Skegness Steamboat Company to charter boats for the holiday season. Services ceased by the end of 1910 due to a buildup of sand at The Wash, which made the journey difficult and resulted in the removal of the unsafe landing stage.

In March 1919, the pier was damaged by a drifting schooner vessel named Europa, creating a breach of 150 feet (46 m) that damage that was estimated to cost around £4,000 to repair. A temporary platform was erected to cover the gap that would last until June 1939 when a full restoration was completed at a cost of £3272 (equivalent to £184,912 in 2025).

=== Mid-20th century ===
During World War II, the pier was closed and parts of the decking removed as part of policy to try to prevent invasions and did not reopen until 1948 following repairs, by then including a cinema, shops and an amusement arcade. At the pierhead was the Pier Saloon, renovated after the war and renamed The Pier Theatre several years later popular with visitors. The north east corner of the pierhead suffered damage during the North Sea flood of 1953, which was rebuilt at a cost of £3000 (equivalent to £101,091 in 2024).

In the early 1970s, the pier entrance archway was demolished to make way for a new construction of shops and amusement arcades, as well as the pierhead theatre being enlarged from a seating capacity of 700 to 1,100. The pier was sold in 1976 to a local engineering company as the financial impact of the refurbishment works caused cashflow difficulties for the original pier company.

=== Late-20th century ===
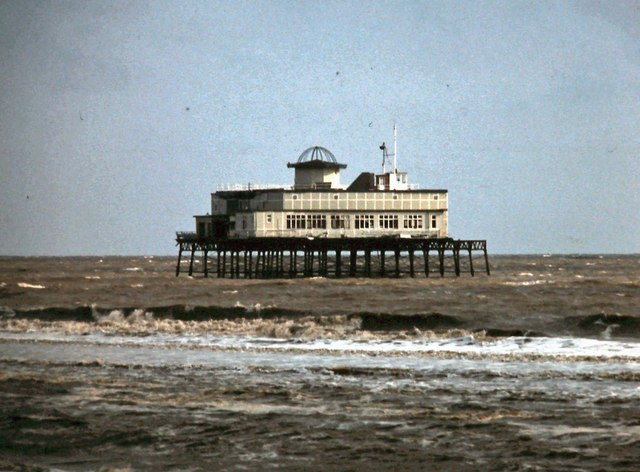
The remains of the Skegness Pierhead cut off from the shore in 1979 after wind damages

On 11 January 1978, a northerly severe gale and storm surge brought disaster to Skegness Pier, along with other piers at Margate, Herne Bay and Hunstanton, causing irretrievable damage. The pier decking from the main entrance was reduced in length to 127 yards (116 m), with the eastern shelters and the pierhead with its theatre isolated from the shoreline. Late in 1978, a plan to link the isolated pierhead by monorail and build a new 1200 seater theatre collapsed when an application for financial assistance was turned down. Debris from the wrecked pier was scattered for several miles around with souvenir hunters coming into the area to see what they could find.

For several years following the storm, the isolated structures remained as features on Skegness beach whilst plans to repair the pier and relink the structures were sought. Proposals to reconnect the pier ultimately failed due to high costs and in 1983, the eastern shelters were dismantled and demolished.

By 1985, the isolated pierhead was derelict and earmarked to be demolished, due to the building falling into a state of disrepair as the upper deck had been badly damaged following the 1978 storm and it had become a roosting place for starlings. It was considered a risk to small shipping and also to the public. Due to its Grade II listed classification, special permission was granted to dismantle the pierhead in stages starting from October 1985, until a fire gutted the building. After the fire burned itself out, only the cast-iron stanchions were left and these were removed in January 1986.

A year later in October 1987, high storm tides caused damage to the then-modern extensions that had been built throughout the 1980s, with securing of the pier's understructure needing to be undertaken before the following spring season. By the end of the 1990s, most of the extensions had been removed, revealing the Victorian pier framework. A variety bar in the entertainment centre was replaced by the bowling centre in 1992.

== Modern pier ==
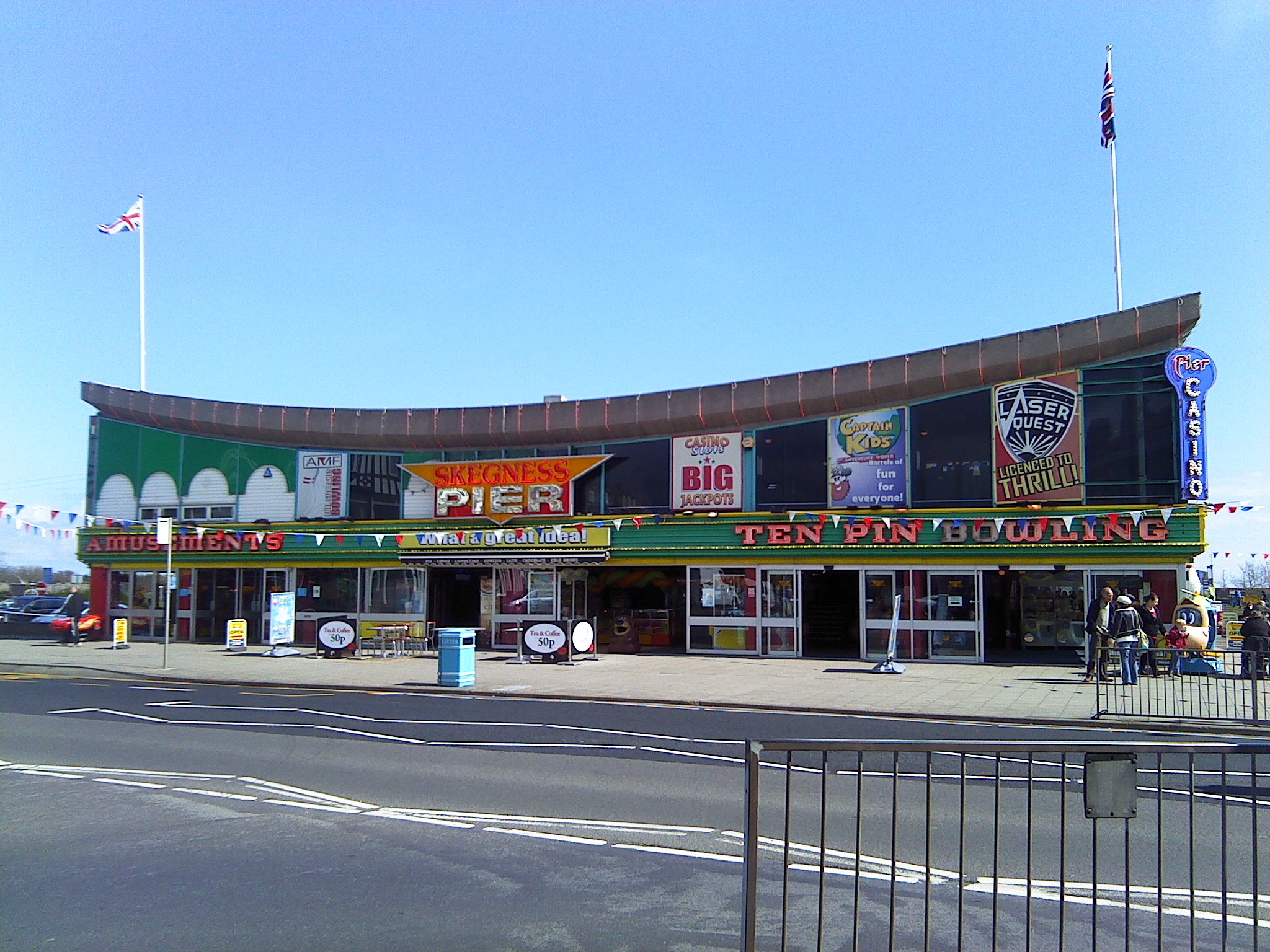
Skegness Pier main building entrance

The present day pier length is 387 ft (118 m) long, with no remaining evidence of the former pierhead and shelters. A bowling alley was built in 1992 with a complete refurbishment programme starting in January 2000 to recapture its classic charm. Despite its much reduced length, it is a major landmark along the beach visible as far as Gibraltar Point to the south and Ingoldmells to the north.

The pier deck was refurbished during 2005–2006 at a cost of around £250,000. Further improvements were made during 2016–17 on the pier's seaward enclosed section, involving fitting new cladding to make it watertight and allowing the pier to open at weekends when demand requires.

The contemporary pier has sections from various different periods, including the entrance pavilion from 1970, the central pierdesk dating back to 1948 and the main deck stretching along the beach being the original Victorian pier.

New owners, Nottingham-based Mellors Group who also own a nearby amusement complex, acquired the pier in early 2021 and in July announced intentions to rebuild the structure from its current length of 387 feet (118 m) to its original length of 1,909 feet (582 m).

== Awards ==
The pier won a Trip Advisor Certificate of Excellence Award in May 2015, celebrating excellence in tourism and hospitality based on visitor reviews.

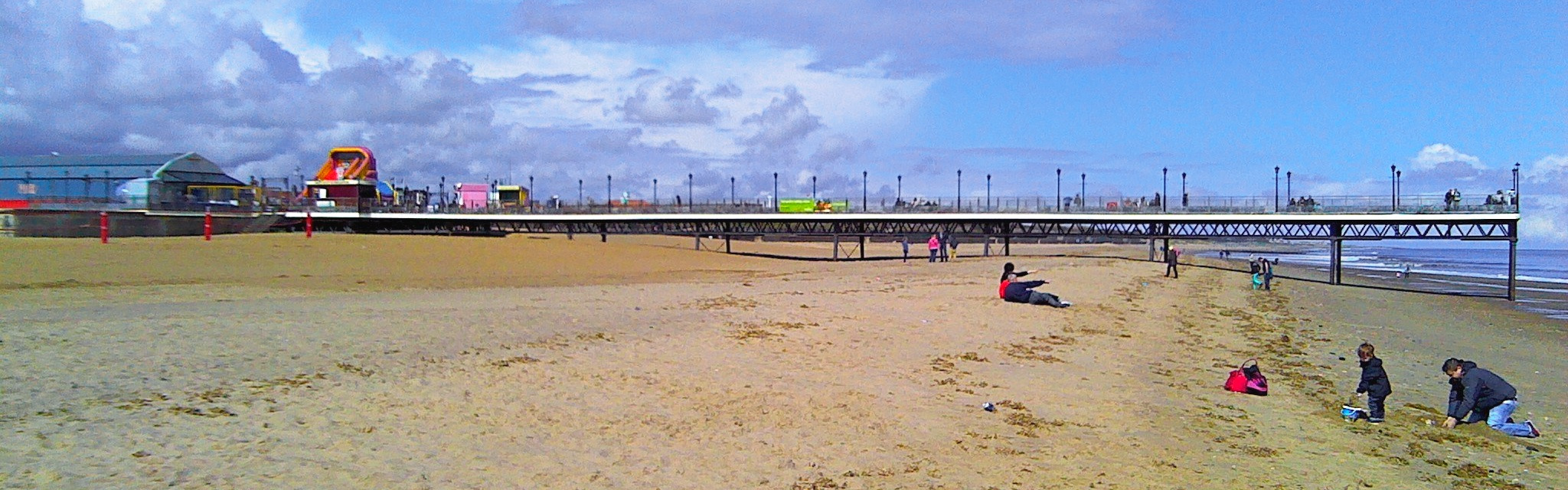
Skegness Pier full length, April 2012
