= Winthorpe, Lincolnshire =

Village in Lincolnshire, England

Coordinates: 53.164887°N 0.336033°E

Winthorpe
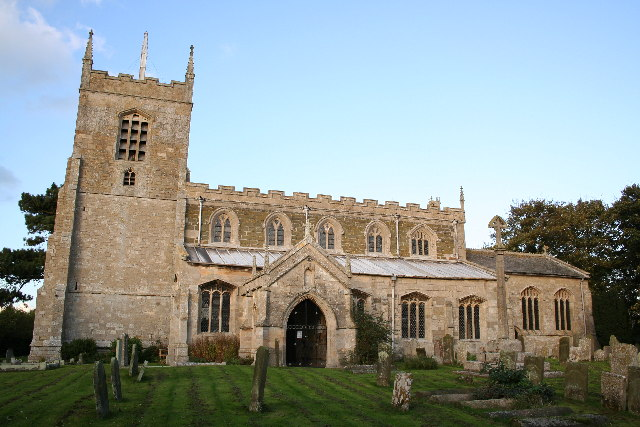
- St Marys Church, Winthorpe

- Location within Lincolnshire
- OS grid reference: TF562656
  - London: 115 mi (185 km) SSW
- Civil parish: Skegness
- District: East Lindsey
- Shire county: Lincolnshire
- Region: East Midlands
- Country: England
- Sovereign state: United Kingdom
- Post town: Skegness
- Postcode district: PE25
- Police: Lincolnshire
- Fire: Lincolnshire
- Ambulance: East Midlands
- UK Parliament: Boston and Skegness

Winthorpe is a small coastal village in the civil parish of Skegness, in the East Lindsey district of Lincolnshire, England. It is situated approximately 2 miles (3.2 km) north from Skegness.

Winthorpe was both an ancient parish, and a civil parish, until 1 April 1926 when it was abolished. A small part of it enlarged Addlethorpe parish, and the larger part of it enlarged Skegness parish. In 1921 the parish had a population of 698. The manor belonged to Lord Monson.

The church is dedicated to Saint Mary and is a Grade I listed building dating from the 13th century, although most of it is 15th-century. Today St Marys forms part of the Skegness Group of Churches, which also includes: St Matthews, Skegness; St Clement, Skegness; St Peter and St Paul, Ingoldmells; and St Nicholas, Addlethorpe.
