= McAllister (surname) =

MacAlister, MacAllister, McAllister
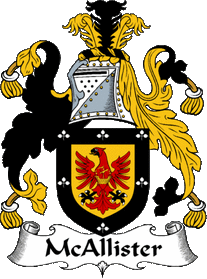
- Language: Gaelic

Origin
- Meaning: "Son of Alasdair"
- Region of origin: Scotland & Ireland

Other names
- Variant form: This surname has multiple spellings which are displayed below

McAllister is a surname from Scotland and Ireland that originates from the Gaelic name Mac Alasdair, meaning son of Alasdair. Alasdair is the Gaelic form of the first name Alexander.

== Surname origins ==
=== Scottish origins ===
The McAllisters for the greater part owe their ancestry to the Scottish Clan Donald. The name is derived from the personal name Alexander and is believed to have been introduced to Scotland by Queen Margaret, wife of King Malcolm Canmore (1057–1093), from the Hungarian Court, where she was raised.

=== Arrival in Ireland ===
Some McAllisters later moved to Ulster as gallowglasses (from Irish: Gallóglaigh meaning foreign warriors) on a seasonal basis at the invitation of the MacDonnells. In Ireland today, the greatest numbers of the name are to be found in Counties Antrim, Armagh, Down, Londonderry, Fermanagh, and Dublin, otherwise the name is widely dispersed.

The MacAllisters spread into the north of Ireland early on; some families of this clan were established there by the 14th century. A considerable number followed the MacDonalds of Dunyvaig to Antrim after that clan lost its Scottish lands in the 1600s.

Like the MacDonalds, the MacAllisters were seen as "uncivilised Gaels" and were not considered appropriate candidates for the Ulster Plantations. Therefore, they are not among the group now known as Ulster-Scots (or Scotch-Irish).

== Common spellings ==
The McAllister surname has many different spellings due to immigration. Some of the common spellings are McAlister, McAllister, McCallister, McCalister, McAlaster, McAlester, McAlister, McAllaster and McAllester.

== Notable people with the surname ==
- Alastair McAllister (born 1942), Australian harpsichord builder
- Alex W. McAllister, American politician; mayor of Huntsville, Alabama
- Anna McAllister (1888–1961), American historian of Catholic women's history
- Anne McAllister, American writer of romance novels
- Billy McAllister (1907–1984), Australian boxer of the 1920s and '30s
- The Mac Allister family of Argentine footballers:
  - Carlos Mac Allister (born 1968), also a politician
  - Francis Mac Allister (born 1995), oldest son
  - Kevin Mac Allister (born 1997), middle son
  - Alexis Mac Allister (born 1998), youngest son
- Colin McAllister (born 1968), Scottish interior designer
- Craig McAllister (born 1980), Scottish footballer
- David McAllister (born 1971), German politician
- David McAllister (dancer) (born 1963), artistic director of The Australian Ballet
- David McAllister (footballer) (born 1988), Irish association footballer for Stevenage
- Deuce McAllister (born 1978), American football player
- Edith McAllister (1918–2018), American civic leader and philanthropist
- Gary McAllister (born 1964), Scottish international footballer, manager
- Ian McAllister (businessman) (born 1943), Scottish businessman
- Ian McAllister (political scientist) (born 1950), Irish-British-Australian professor of political science, Australian National University
- Jamie McAllister (born 1978), Scottish international footballer
- Jenn McAllister (born 1996), American YouTube personality
- Jim McAllister (1944–2013), Irish activist and politician
- John D. T. McAllister (1827–1910), Utah pioneer and Mormon leader
- Kevin McAllister (disambiguation), several people
- Mary E. McAllister, North Carolina state Representative
- Matthew McAllister (1758–1823), American lawyer and politician
- Matthew Hall McAllister (1800–1865), American judge
- Michael McAllister (disambiguation), several people
- Nuala McAllister, Northern Irish politician
- Randy McAllister, American blues and Americana musician
- Rita McAllister (born 1946), Scottish musicologist
- Rod McAllister (born 1961), British architect
- Rory McAllister (footballer) (born 1987), Scottish footballer
- Ryan McAllister (born 1978), Canadian singer/songwriter, member of Dakona
- Sam J. McAllister (1904–1975), American college sports coach
- Samuel McAllister (1869–1903), United States Navy sailor, Medal of Honor recipient
- Sean McAllister (filmmaker) (born 1965), British documentary filmmaker
- Sean McAllister (footballer, born 1987), English footballer
- Sean McAllister (footballer, born 2002), Northern Irish footballer
- Sport McAllister (1874–1962), American baseball player
- Sue McAllister, British Director General
- Timothy McAllister (born 1962), American musician
- Vance McAllister (born 1974), member of the United States House of Representatives from Louisiana, 2013–2015
- Ward McAllister (1827–1895), American socialite
- Ward McAllister Jr. (1855–1908), American lawyer and judge
- William K. McAllister (1818–1885), American jurist

== Fictional characters with the surname ==
- Jessica McAllister from the soap opera Emmerdale
- Kevin McCallister from the film series Home Alone

== See also ==
- Clan MacAlister
- McAlister, surname
- McCalister, surname
- McCallister, surname
- McAlester (disambiguation), includes a list of people with surname McAlester
