= Macalister =

Macalister, MacAlister, MacAllister and their variants are forms of a Gaelic surname which means 'son of Alisdair'. The name originated in Scotland and belonged to a branch of the Clan Donald; they became an independent clan in 1493. From about the thirteenth century, MacAlisters were settling in the Glens of Northern Ireland, and they became numerous there.

It can refer to the following people:

== MacAlister ==
- Donald MacAlister (1854–1934), physician, and former chancellor of the University of Glasgow
- John Young Walker MacAlister (1856–1925), British librarian
- Josh MacAlister (born 1987), British politician
- Ian MacAlister Stewart, 13th Laird of Achnacone
- Katie MacAlister (born 1964), Seattle-area writer
- Patrick MacAlister (1826–1895), Irish Roman Catholic Prelate and 24th Lord Bishop of Down and Connor

== Macalister ==
- Arthur Macalister (1818–1883), thrice Premier of Queensland, Australia
- Very Rev D. M. Macalister (1832–1909), Moderator of the General Assembly of the Free Church of Scotland 1902
- David Macalister Silva (born 1986), Colombian footballer
- John Kenneth Macalister (1914–1944), Canadian hero of World War II
- Norman Macalister, former lieutenant-governor of Prince of Wales Isle
- R. A. Stewart Macalister (1870–1950), Irish archaeologist
- Robert Macalister (1890–1967), former mayor of Wellington

== MacAllister ==
- Dylan Macallister (born 1982), Australian footballer
- Heather MacAllister, American writer
- Heather MacAllister (activist) (1968–2007), American performer and activist

== Mac Allister ==
A family of Argentine footballers:

- First generation:
  - Patricio Mac Allister (born 1966)
  - Carlos Mac Allister (born 1968), brother of Patricio and also a politician
- Second generation, all sons of Carlos:
  - Francis Mac Allister (born 1995)
  - Kevin Mac Allister (born 1997)
  - Alexis Mac Allister (born 1998)

== Places ==
- Macalister Road, George Town, Penang, Malaysia
- Macalister, Queensland, a town in Australia
- Macalister, an electoral district in the Legislative Assembly of Queensland, Australia, created in the 2017 redistribution
- Macalister River, in Victoria, Australia

=== See also ===
- Macalester
- McAlister
- McAllister (surname)
- Clan MacAlister, a Highland Scottish clan and a branch of Clan Donald
