= McAlister (disambiguation) =

McAlister is a northern Irish and Scottish surname.

McAlister may also refer to:

- McAlister Field House
- McAlister Place, New Orleans
- McAlister's Deli

== See also ==
- McAllister (disambiguation)
- McAlester (disambiguation)
