= McAllaster =

McAllaster may refer to:

- McAllaster, Kansas, an unincorporated community in Logan County, Kansas, United States
- Eugene McAllaster (1866–1946), American engineer and naval architect

== See also ==
- McAlester (disambiguation)
- McAllister (disambiguation)
