= Macalester (disambiguation) =

Macalester College is a private liberal arts college in Saint Paul, Minnesota, US.

Macalester may also refer to:

- Mount Macalester, peak in Antarctica

== People with the surname Macalester ==
- Charles Macalester (1798–1873), American businessman and philanthropist
- Charles Somerville MacAlester (1797–1891), chief of Clan MacAlister

== See also ==
- McAlester (disambiguation)
- McAlister (disambiguation)
