= Boys to Men =

Boys to Men may refer to:

- Boyz II Men, American band
- Boys II Men (album), by Maskinen
- "Boys to Men" (New Edition single), 1991 single
- Ah Boys to Men (film series), film series
- From Boys to Men, book
- Boys and Men, Japanese idol group
