= McAleese =

McAleese or McGillis is an Irish and Scottish surname and is an anglicisation of the Irish Mac Giolla Íosa from the Irish given name Giolla Íosa (Servant of Jesus). This name is common in Derry and in Antrim.

Notable people with the surname include:

- Jack McAleese, Major League Baseball player
- John McAleese, MM (1949–2011), British Army soldier who led an SAS team against the Iranian embassy in London in May 1980 to end the siege
- Martin McAleese, member of Seanad Éireann and the husband of the former President of Ireland, Mary McAleese
- Mary McAleese (born 1951), eighth President of Ireland from 1997 to 2011
- Peter McAleese, British ex-paratrooper, ex-member of the SAS and author

== See also ==
- McAlester (disambiguation)
