= Irish Argentines =

Argentine citizens of Irish descent

Gael-Airgintínigh (Irish) Hiberno-argentinos (Spanish)
- (Argentina) (Republic of Ireland)
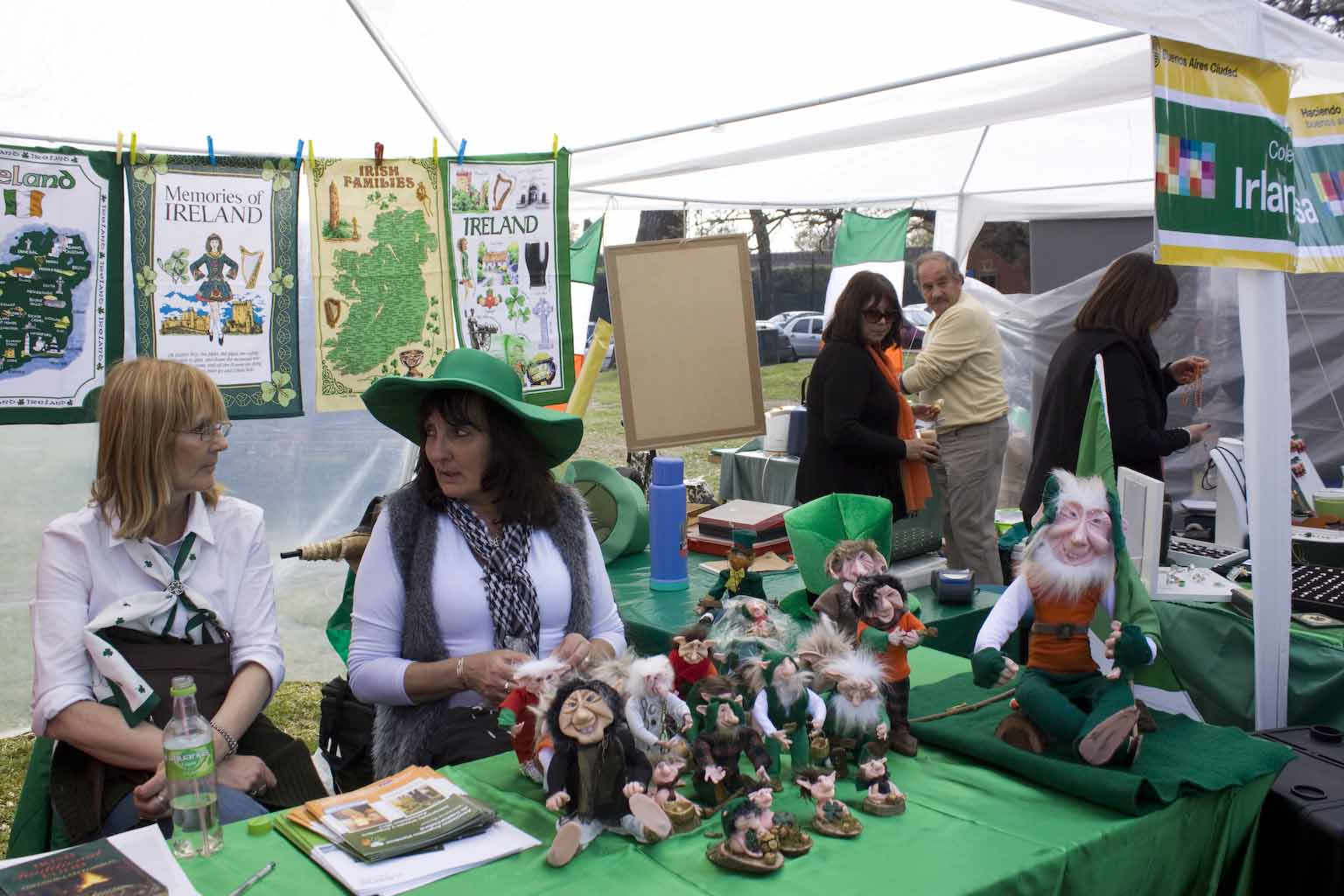
- Irish Argentines during the Day of the immigrants in Buenos Aires.

Total population
- 500,000 – 1,000,000; 1-2% of population

Regions with significant populations
- Buenos Aires, Buenos Aires Province, Córdoba Province, Entre Ríos Province, Santa Fe Province

Languages
- Predominantly Spanish; Minority speak Irish and English

Religion
- Predominantly Roman Catholicism

Related ethnic groups
- Irish, English Argentine, Scottish Argentine, Welsh Argentine, Spanish Argentine, Irish American, Irish Canadian, Irish Brazilian, Irish Uruguayan, Irish Chilean, Irish Mexican

Irish Argentines are Argentine citizens who are fully or partially of Irish descent. Irish emigrants to Argentina predominantly came from the midlands and south-east (particularly Wexford) regions of Ireland, arriving largely between 1830 and 1930, with the greatest wave taking place in 1850–1870. The modern Irish-Argentine community is composed of some of their descendants, and the total number is estimated at between 500,000 and 1,000,000.

Argentina is the home of the fifth largest Irish community in the world, the largest in a non-English speaking nation and the greatest in Latin America.

== Reasons for emigration ==
Percentage of people registered as British in the 1914 Argentine census. Within this group are Irish, English, Scottish and Welsh.

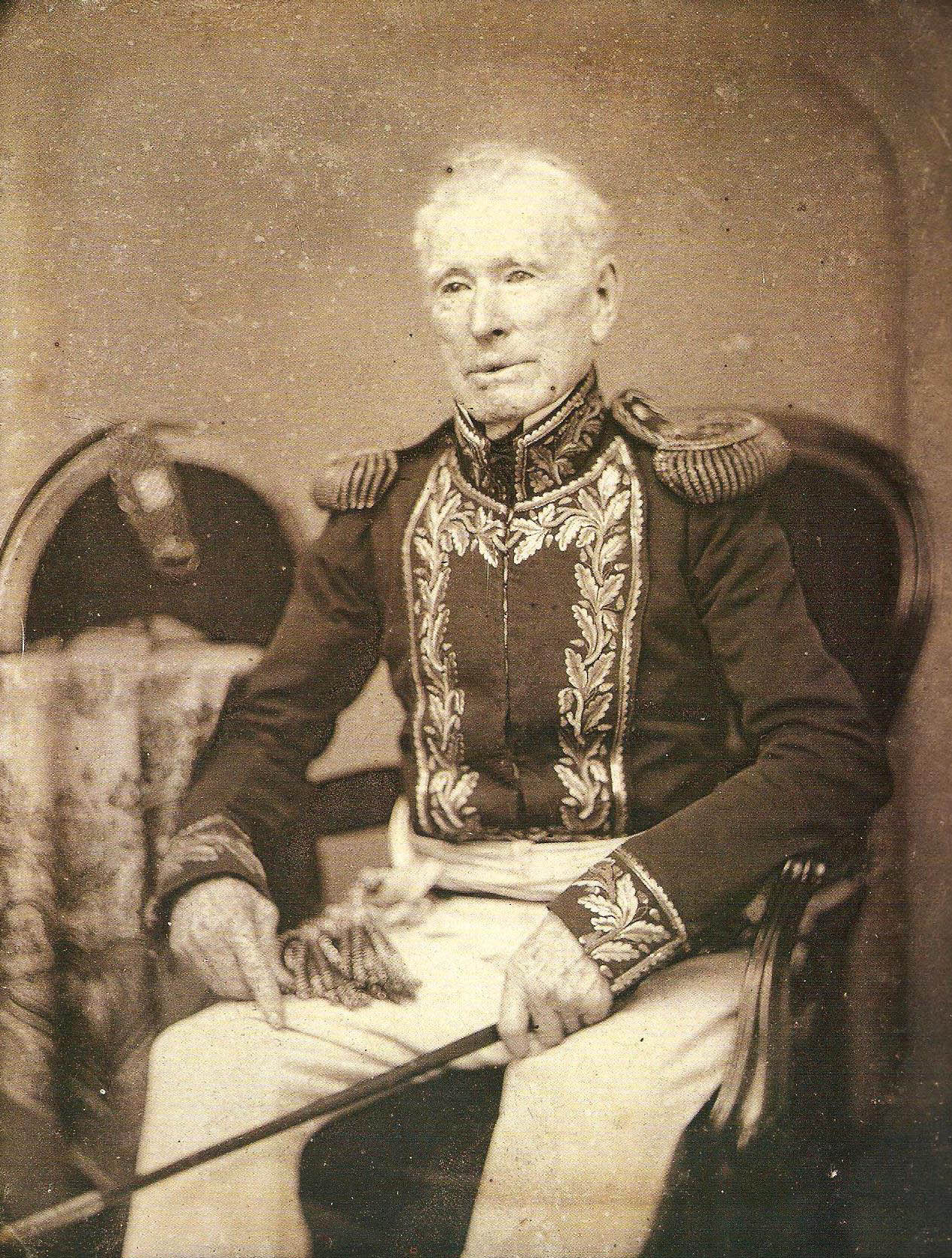
Irish-born Admiral William Brown, commonly known as the "father of the Argentine Navy", is regarded as one of Argentina's national heroes.

Most of those who left Ireland arrived in Buenos Aires attracted by the possibility of better living conditions, as the economic, social and political conditions in Ireland at the time were quite poor, but the emigrants came from counties and social segments in which the economic conditions were not the worst (Westmeath, Longford, Offaly, Wexford). Others, in turn, left after receiving favourable descriptions of the country from friends and family who had already arrived in Argentina. The real or perceived possibility of becoming landowners in the Río de la Plata region (Argentina and Uruguay), and consequently joining the South American landed gentry, was the most important factor attracting thousands of young men to the area. Others had arrived earlier as merchants, artisans and mercenaries, such as William Brown, who fought for the cause of Argentine independence and the Argentine war against Brazil. For Irish immigrants, the new lands of the Southern Cone of South America brought further interest for immigration to purchase large land tracts for bargain prices, working first as labourers, then in "halves" or "thirds" in the sheep-farming business, and finally renting and purchasing land.

== Numbers of immigrants ==
It is difficult to accurately calculate the exact number of immigrants. Many Irish newcomers declared themselves to be ingleses, as all of Ireland at the time was still part of the United Kingdom, and others were simply assumed to be British by the authorities. The immigration records in Buenos Aires lack any entries dating from before 1822 and the years 1823, 1824, 1836, 1840, 1841, 1842 and 1855. The records in between these years are also incomplete, due to conflicts of who was Irish, English and Scottish in South American demographics.

Between 1822 and 1829, at least 7,160 Irish immigrants arrived, 1889 being the peak of this migration (on 15 February of this year 1,774 people arrived on the steamer SS Dresden). Based on incomplete passenger list records, as well as on census returns (Buenos Aires 1855, national 1869 and national 1895) transcribed by Eduardo A. Coghlan (1982, 1987), researchers made elaborate calculations of the total number of immigrants. Juan Carlos Korol and Hilda Sabato estimated that the total number of Irish immigrants in the nineteenth century was between 10,500 and 11,500 (Cómo fue la inmigración irlandesa a la Argentina, 1981 p. 48). However, further research conducted by Patrick MacKenna shows that Coghlan, Korol and Sabato did not consider return migration and re-migration, which was significant after the 1880s, as well as the high mortality ratios for the Irish immigrants in certain periods before the 1869 census (e.g. during the 1868 cholera outbreak in Buenos Aires Province).

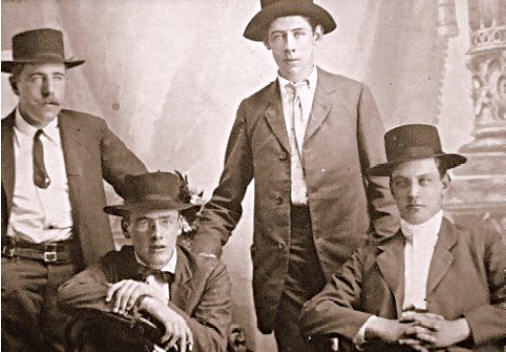
Group of Irishmen in Argentina in the 19th century

For the nineteenth century, one out of every two Irish emigrants to Argentina went back to Ireland or re-migrated to the United States, Canada, Australia and other destinations. MacKenna says that Korol and Sabato "greatly underestimated the number of Irish immigrants" and considers that the total number of Irish immigrants in Argentina in the nineteenth century should be estimated in between 45,000 and 50,000 (M.A. thesis at NUI Maynooth, 1992, p. 83). The neglect of Anglo-Irish, Scot-Irish and in general Protestant Irish immigration in Argentina should add further numbers, particularly in the last peak of immigration after the 1920s Anglo-Irish War of Independence. The southernmost tip of Chile and Argentina, in places like the city of Punta Arenas and also the Falkland Islands, were other destinations for Irish and Scottish immigrants which are frequently underestimated.

Eduardo A. Coghlan reported 16,284 Irish Argentines in Buenos Aires and Buenos Aires Province at the turn of the twentieth century. Only 4,693 of these had actually been born in Ireland, just 28.8% of the population, while another 11,591 individuals had been born in Argentina. At present, roughly 650,000 Argentines are of Irish descent.

== Economic activities ==
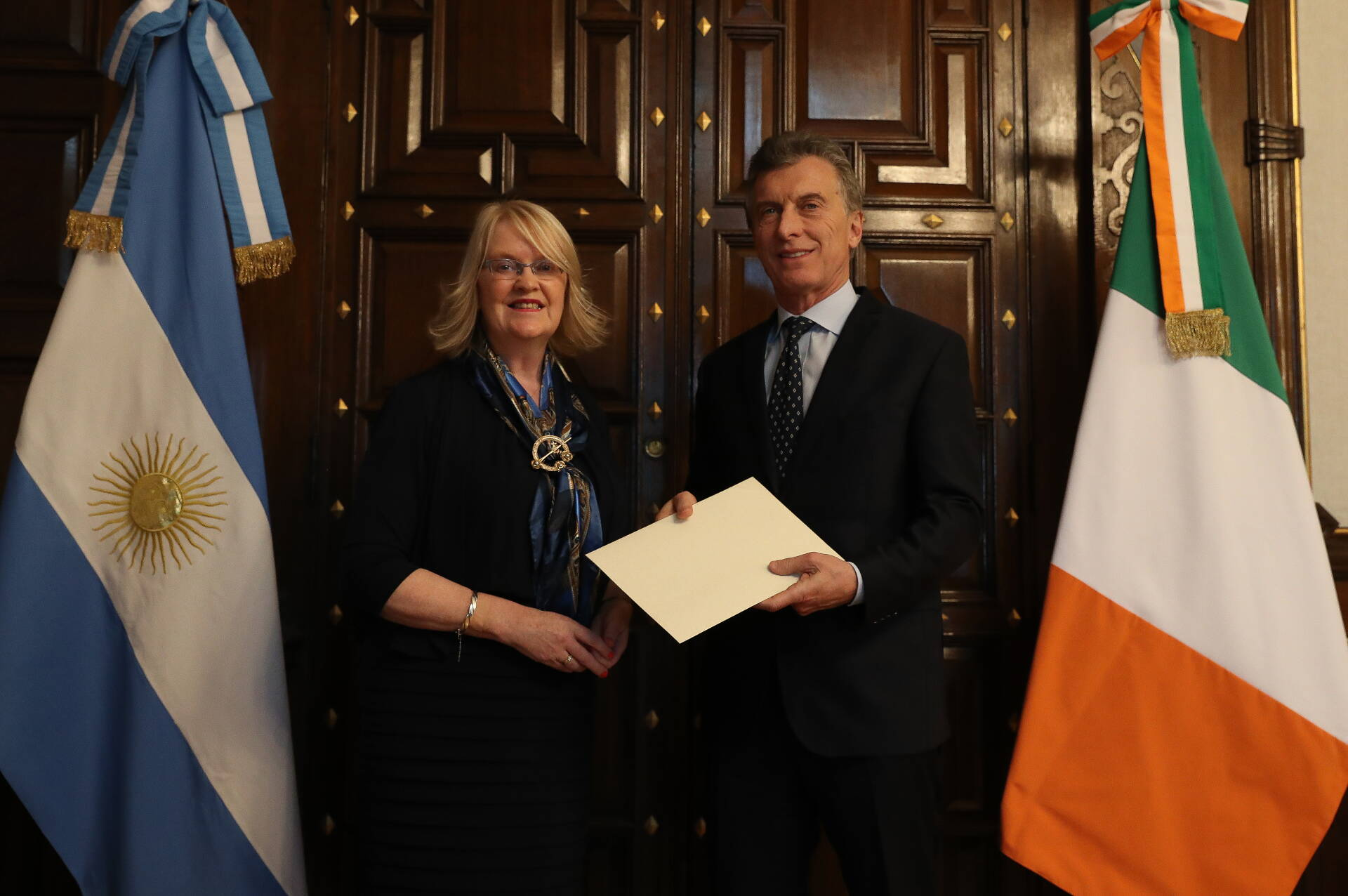
President Mauricio Macri and Irish Ambassador in Argentina, Jacqueline O’Halloran.

The Irish immigrants settled mainly in the city and province of Buenos Aires, and also the littoral provinces. Those in urban areas worked as labourers, merchants, employees, artisans, teachers, professionals and, increasingly after the 1860s and especially for women, as domestic servants. The Irish in the countryside worked as rural labourers, cattle dealers, and shepherds. Those in the flourishing sheep-farming business of 1840–1890 were most likely to succeed working as shepherds and sharing a half or a third of the produce in wool and lambs. In this way, some of them managed to rent and later purchase land.

In Cura Malal, Buenos Aires Province, and Venado Tuerto, Santa Fe Province, Eduardo Casey helped populate the agriculturally barren provinces, inviting more Irish and other immigrants to Argentina to work for him. This recommendation system was very active, and, with almost limitless amounts of land available, many Irish immigrants went on to do very well economically. This industry expanded to other places, eventually flourishing in the rest of Santa Fe Province, Entre Ríos Province and Córdoba Province.

== The Dresden Affair ==
The Dresden Affair marked the end of mass Irish emigration to Argentina. Less fortunate Irish immigrants were recruited in the 1870s and 1880s among poor segments in Dublin, Cork and other counties, and sent as colonists to Argentina. Irish-Argentine agents hired by the Buenos Aires provincial government actively worked in Ireland and were paid by the state and the shipping companies. In 1889, the Dresden Affair occurred when agents Buckley O'Meara and John Stephen Dillon sent 1,774 emigrants in the steamer City of Dresden. Many died due to the conditions of the journey or upon arrival in Buenos Aires. About seven hundred were carried to Bahía Blanca to establish the Irish Colony of Napostá, which in a few months was a failure. The vast majority of these immigrants did not stay in the country, and struggled to go back to Ireland or re-migrated to the United States and other places. Following the Dresden Affair, in 1889, Archbishop of Cashel, Thomas Croke wrote: "I most solemnly conjure my poorer countrymen, as they value their happiness hereafter, never to set foot on the Argentine Republic however tempted to do so they may be by offers of a passage or an assurance of comfortable homes."

Irish immigrants began arriving in Argentina in the 19th century, largely as gauchos and ranchers on the Pampas of Buenos Aires Province.

== Culture and sport ==
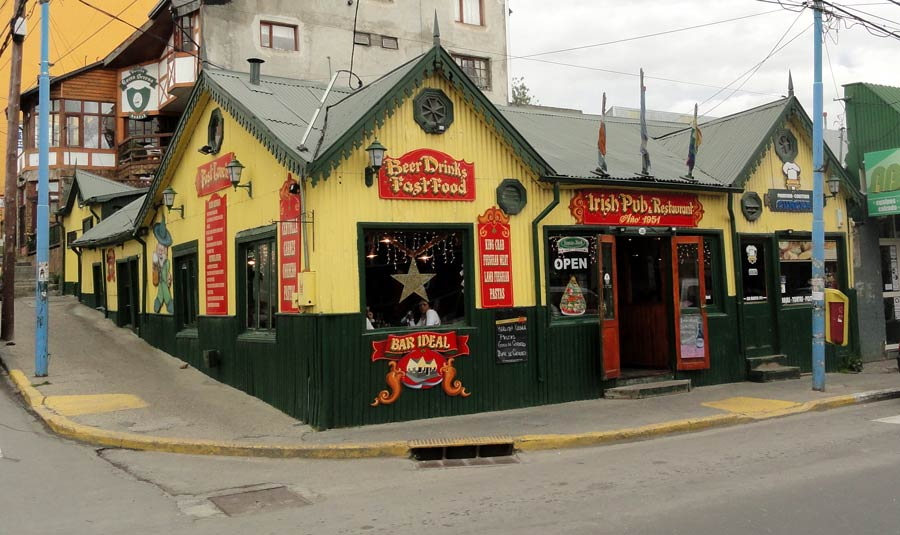
Irish Pub in Ushuaia, Tierra del Fuego.

The earliest reference to hurling in Argentina dates from the late 1880s in the ranching town of Mercedes, Buenos Aires, a major center of the Irish-Argentine community. However, the game wasn't actively promoted until 1900 when it came to the attention of author and newspaperman William Bulfin. Under Bulfin's patronage, the Argentine Hurling Club was formed on 15 July 1900. On 17 August 1900, Bulfin printed the rules and a diagram of a hurling pitch in The Southern Cross, the official newspaper of the Argentina's Irish community. Enthusiasm spread rapidly and teams were quickly established in both the neighborhoods of Buenos Aires and the surrounding farming communities. The Passionist and Pallotine Orders took a major role in promoting the game.

Games of hurling were played every weekend until 1914 and received frequent coverage even from Argentina's Spanish language newspapers like La Nacion. After the outbreak of World War I, however, it became very almost impossible to obtain hurleys from Ireland. An attempt was made to use native Argentine mountain ash, but it proved too heavy and lacking in pliability. Although the game was revived after the end of the war, the golden age of Argentine hurling had passed. World War II finally brought the era to its close.

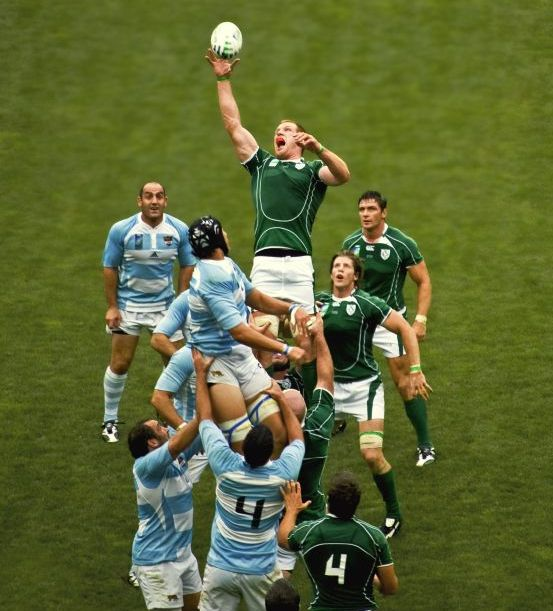
Ireland and Argentina playing during the 2007 Rugby World Cup.

In the aftermath of the Second World War, immigration from Ireland slowed to a trickle. In addition, native born Irish-Argentines assimilated far quicker than in other places, Hispanicising their names and frequently marrying outside the community, something unheard of in the past. Although the game continued to be occasionally played into the 1960s, it would never regain its former popularity. In 1980 the Aer Lingus Hurling Club conducted a three-week tour of the country and played matches at several locations, including the Christian Brothers school at Boulogne, Buenos Aires, Colegio Cardenal Newman.

In January 2002 for the first time The Hurling All-Stars Teams 2000 y 2001 came to the Hurling Club in Argentina making an outstanding exhibition.

The Argentine Hurling Club counts now with a Hurling and a Gaelic Football team, this last one won the first World Games held in Abu Dhabi in the non-Irish division. Club Atlético San Isidro (CASI) also has a Gaelic Football Team.

== Irish Argentines ==
The first Irishmen that arrived in present-day Argentina were the brothers Juan and Tomás (John and Thomas) Farrel in 1536. They were members of Pedro de Mendoza's expedition.

=== Politics and military ===
- Guillermo Brown (1777–1857), first Admiral of Argentina and father of the Argentine Navy
- Eamon Bulfin (1892–1968), Argentine-born Irish Republican who emigrated to Ireland and participated in the Easter Rising, son of the journalist William Bulfin.
- Peter Campbell (1780-c.1832), military and naval officer who founded the National Navy of Uruguay. He was also prominent leader of the federal party in the province of Corrientes
- John William Cooke (1919–1968), politician and left-wing peronist leader
- Domingo Cullen (1791–1839), governor of Santa Fe Province
- Patricio Cullen (1826–1877), national deputy and governor of the province of Santa Fe between 1854 and 1856
- Juan Dillon (1819–1887), landlord and politician
- Edelmiro Julián Farrell (1887–1980), army general, de facto President of Argentina between 1944 and 1946
- Domingo French (1774–1825), politician and soldier in the War of Independence and protagonist of the May Revolution. He was one of the creators of the Argentina cockade
- José Ignacio García Hamilton (1943–2009), lawyer, journalist, writer, historian and national deputy for the province of Tucuman
- Ernesto "Che" Guevara Serna (1928–1967), politician, military theorist, writer, journalist and Argentine-Cuban doctor
- Guillermo Patricio Kelly (1921–2005), activist, journalist and political leader
- John Thomond O'Brien (1786–1861), general who fought on the patriot side during the War of Independence
- Dalmacio Vélez Sarsfield (1800–1875), lawyer and politician who wrote the Argentine Civil Code of 1869
- Patricia Walsh (born 1952), legislator of the City of Buenos Aires
- Manuel Antonio Warnes (1727–1802), regidor and alcalde of Buenos Aires
- Eduardo Wilde (1844–1913), physician, hygienist, writer, journalist, provincial and national deputy, minister of the governments of Julio A. Roca and Miguel Celman

=== Arts and literature ===
- Adolfo Bioy Casares (1914–1999), writer, a descendant of Patrick Lynch
- Chris de Burgh (born 1948), singer and songwriter
- Gustavo Cerati Clarke (1959–2014), singer, songwriter, and member of the band Soda Stereo, was of Irish descent from his mother's side.
- Oscar Barney Finn (born 1938), writer, film and theater director
- Juan Carlos Howard (1912–1986), pianist, director, arranger, and composer of tangos
- Benito Lynch (1885–1951), writer of gaucho literature
- Julio Porter (1916–1979), film and television screenwriter, and film director
- María Elena Walsh (1930–2011), poet, writer, musician, playwright, and songwriter
- Rodolfo Walsh (1927–1977), journalist and writer, who disappeared on 24 March 1977, after publishing a letter openly opposing the Junta Militar de facto government.

=== Business and socialites ===
- Eduardo Casey (1847–1906), estanciero and businessman, founder of the city of Venado Tuerto
- Corina Kavanagh (1890–1984), heiress, commissioner of the Kavanagh Building in Buenos Aires
- Camila O'Gorman (1825–1848), socialite

=== Sports ===
- Eduardo Bradley (1887–1951), pilot and balloonist, co-founder of civil aviation in Argentina
- Jorge Brown (1880–1936), footballer and cricketer
- Roberto Cavanagh (1914–2002), polo player and Olympic gold medallist 1936
- Agustín Creevy (born 1985), rugby player
- Alfredo Di Stéfano (1926–2014), footballer
- Óscar Furlong (1927–2018), basketball player
- Nicolás Keenan (born 1997), field hockey player
- Arturo Kenny (1888- ? ), polo player and Olympic gold medalist (Paris 1924)
- The Mac Allister family of footballers:
  - Patricio Mac Allister (born 1966)
  - Carlos Mac Allister (born 1968), brother of Patricio, also a politician
  - Francis Mac Allister (born 1995), oldest son of Carlos
  - Kevin Mac Allister (born 1997), middle son of Carlos
  - Alexis Mac Allister (born 1998), youngest son of Carlos
- Pablo Mac Donough (born 1982), polo player
- Jorge Alejandro Newbery (1875–1914), pilot, sportsman, public officer, engineer and scientist. He is especially remembered for being the architect and founder of the Argentine air force
- Santiago Phelan (born 1974), rugby player and coach of the Argentina rugby team Los Pumas
- Patrick "Paddy" McCarthy (1871-1963), footballer, boxer and important figure in the founding of Boca Juniors

=== Clergy ===
- Patrick Joseph Dillon (1842–1889), priest and politician, founder of The Southern Cross newspaper
- Anthony Dominic Fahy (1805–1871), Irish Catholic priest, member of the Dominican Order, missionary and de facto head of the Irish community in Argentina between 1844 until 1871, the year of his death.

=== Other ===
- Cecilia Grierson (1859–1934), first female physician in Argentina
- Violet Jessop (1887–1971), ocean liner stewardess and nurse who is known for surviving the disastrous sinkings of both RMS Titanic and her sister ship, HMHS Britannic, in 1912 and 1916
- Norma Nolan (1938–2025), first Argentine woman to win the Miss Universe title
- Guillermo O'Donnell (1936–2011), political scientist
- Elvira Rawson (1867–1954), second woman to get a medical degree in Argentina in 1892 and a prominent feminist fighter for equal rights for men and women

== Irish community today ==
The Irish community in Argentina is the largest in any non-English speaking country in the world and is the fifth largest in the world. The Irish community in Argentina still try to keep up the inherited traditions and to rescue those other traditions that have been lost over time. It is estimated that there are over 1,000,000 Irish descendants in modern-day Argentina.

== See also ==
- Argentina-Ireland relations
