= Michael McAllister (disambiguation) =

Michael F. McAllister is a United States Coast Guard admiral.

Michael McAllister may also refer to:

- Michael McAllister, character in Bad Behaviour
- Michael McAllister, contributed to From Boys to Men: Gay Men Write About Growing Up
- Mike McAllister, character in the 1975 film The Human Factor
- Michael MacAllister, musician, see Kotringo
- Mick McAllister, character in Teenwolf

== See also ==
- Michael J. McAlister, special effects artist
