= Argentina–Ireland relations =

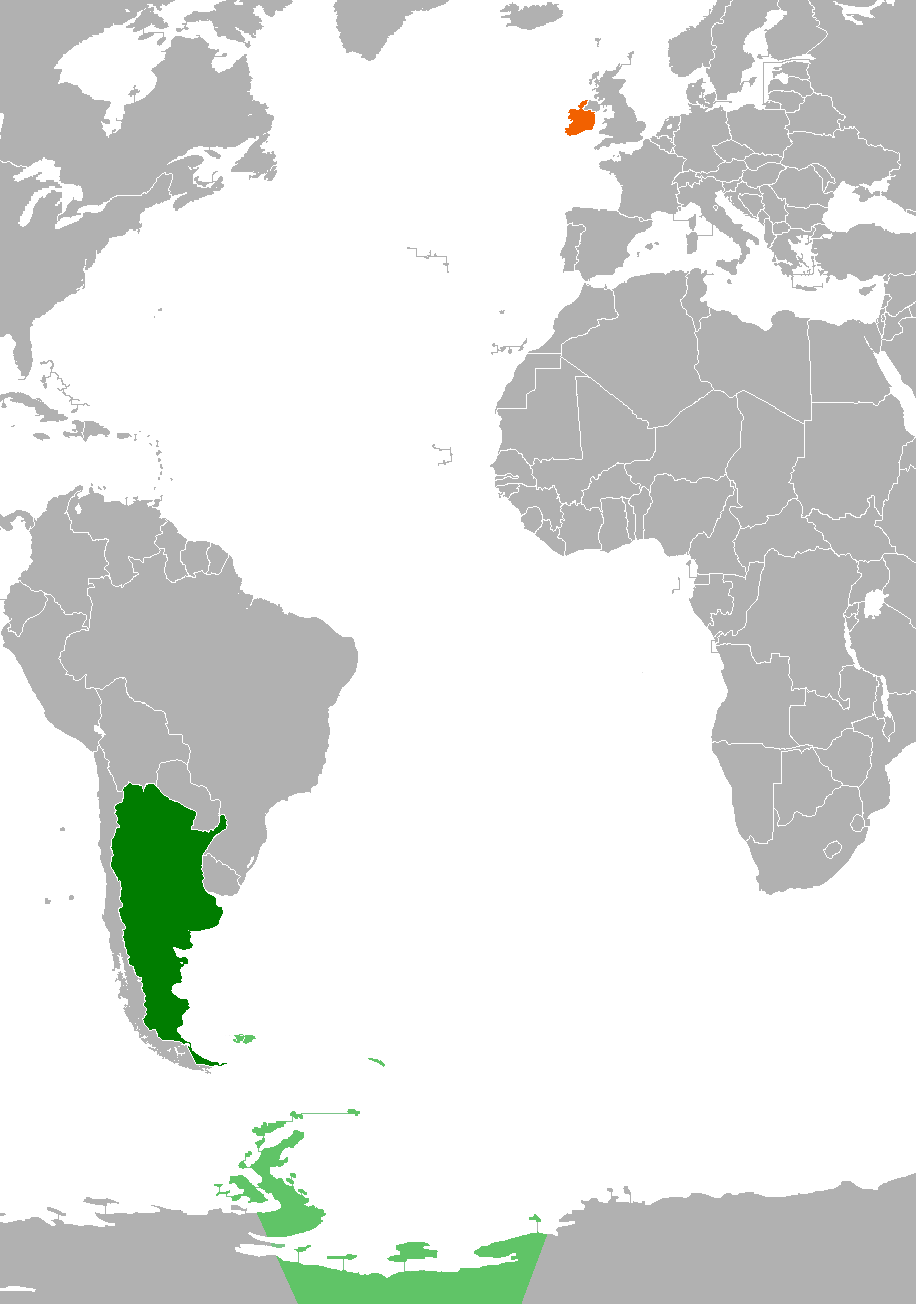

- Argentina: Ireland

Foreign relations between the Argentine Republic and Ireland, have existed for over a century. Both nations share a history of Irish culture after over 50,000 Irish settlers migrated to Argentina. Argentina is home to the fifth largest Irish community abroad and the biggest in a non-English speaking nation. Over half a million Argentine nationals claim Irish heritage. Both nations are members of the United Nations.

== History ==
Early Irish migrants may have arrived to Argentina with Spanish settlers in the service of Spain. From 1806 to 1807, British forces tried unsuccessfully to seize control of parts of Argentina, mostly around the Río de la Plata area, which became known as the British invasions of the River Plate. During the invasion, several Irish soldiers deserted the British army and joined the Spanish/Argentine army. The best known Irish was Admiral William Brown who arrived to Argentina in 1810. He is accredited for creating the Argentine Navy and for fighting on behalf of Argentina against Spain, Brazil, England and France. Due to poverty and famine, over 50,000 Irish nationals migrated to Argentina between the years of 1830–1930 in search of land and a better life.

In 1916, during the Easter Rising, it was an Argentine born Irishman by the name of Eamon Bulfin who raised the flag saying "Irish Republic" over the General Post Office in Dublin. Because Bulfin was Argentine, he was not executed after being caught by the British. He was deported to Argentina and later was appointed by Éamon de Valera as the first Irish consul in Buenos Aires. Bulfin was joined by Irish Republican Laurence Ginnell in 1921 to promote support for Irish independence and to raise a £500,000 loan from the richest members of the Irish community in Argentina. In 1937, Ireland became an independent nation and in June 1947, both Argentina and Ireland established diplomatic relations. That same year, Ireland opened its embassy in Buenos Aires.

During the Falklands War (April - May 1982) between Argentina and the United Kingdom, Ireland was a non-permanent member of the United Nations Security Council and voted for the United Nations Security Council Resolution 502 which demanded an immediate cessation of hostilities between Argentina and the United Kingdom and a complete withdrawal by Argentine forces of the Falklands Islands. At the same time the British Prime Minister Margaret Thatcher asked the Irish government to abstain from a resolution calling for a ceasefire between the United Kingdom and Argentina.

In 2016, Argentina and Ireland jointly celebrated the bicentennial of Argentina's independence and Ireland's centenary of the Easter Rising.

== High-level visits ==
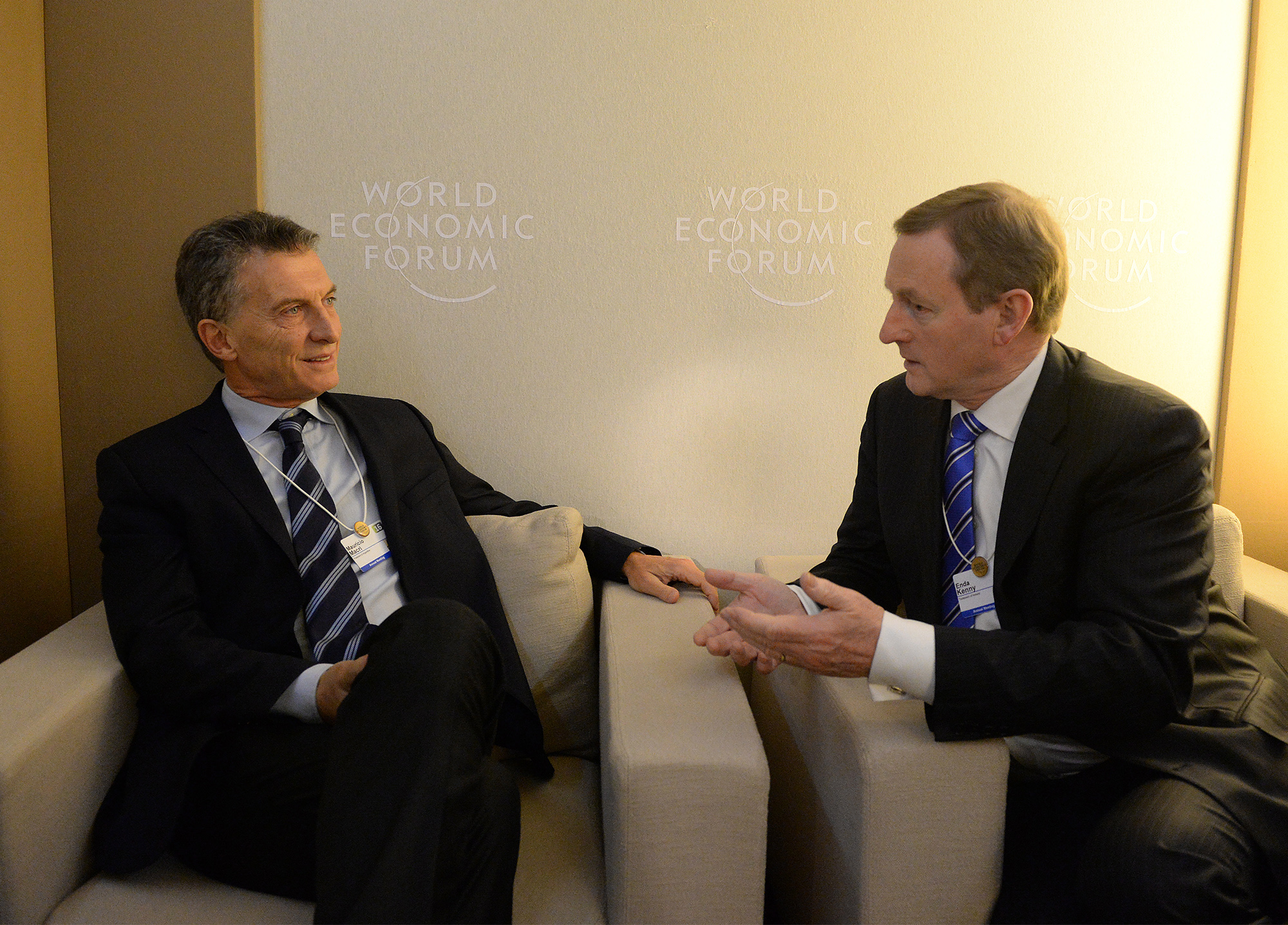
Argentine President Mauricio Macri meeting with Irish Taoiseach Enda Kenny in Davos, Switzerland; January 2016.

High-level visits from Argentina to Ireland

- Senator Daniel Filmus (2013)
- Representative Guillermo Carmona (2013)

High-level visits from Ireland to Argentina

- President Mary Robinson (1995)
- Taoiseach Bertie Ahern (2001)
- President Mary McAleese (2004)
- Foreign Minister Dermot Ahern (2008)
- President Michael D. Higgins (2012)

== Trade ==
In 2017, total trade between Argentina and Ireland totaled €500 million Euros. Argentina's main exports to Ireland include: Soybeans, Bran, Wine, other vegetables and essential oils. Ireland's main exports to Argentina include: Human or animal blood, packaged medicaments, cranes, computers and medical equipment. Argentina is Ireland's third biggest trading partner in Latin America. In 2000, member nations of Mercosur (which includes Argentina) and the European Union (which includes Ireland) began negotiations on a free trade agreement.

== Bilateral agreements ==
Both nations have signed a few bilateral agreements such as an Agreement on the Exchange of Tax Information and an Agreement for a Working holiday visa (2015).

== Resident diplomatic missions ==
- Argentina has an embassy in Dublin.
- Ireland has an embassy in Buenos Aires.
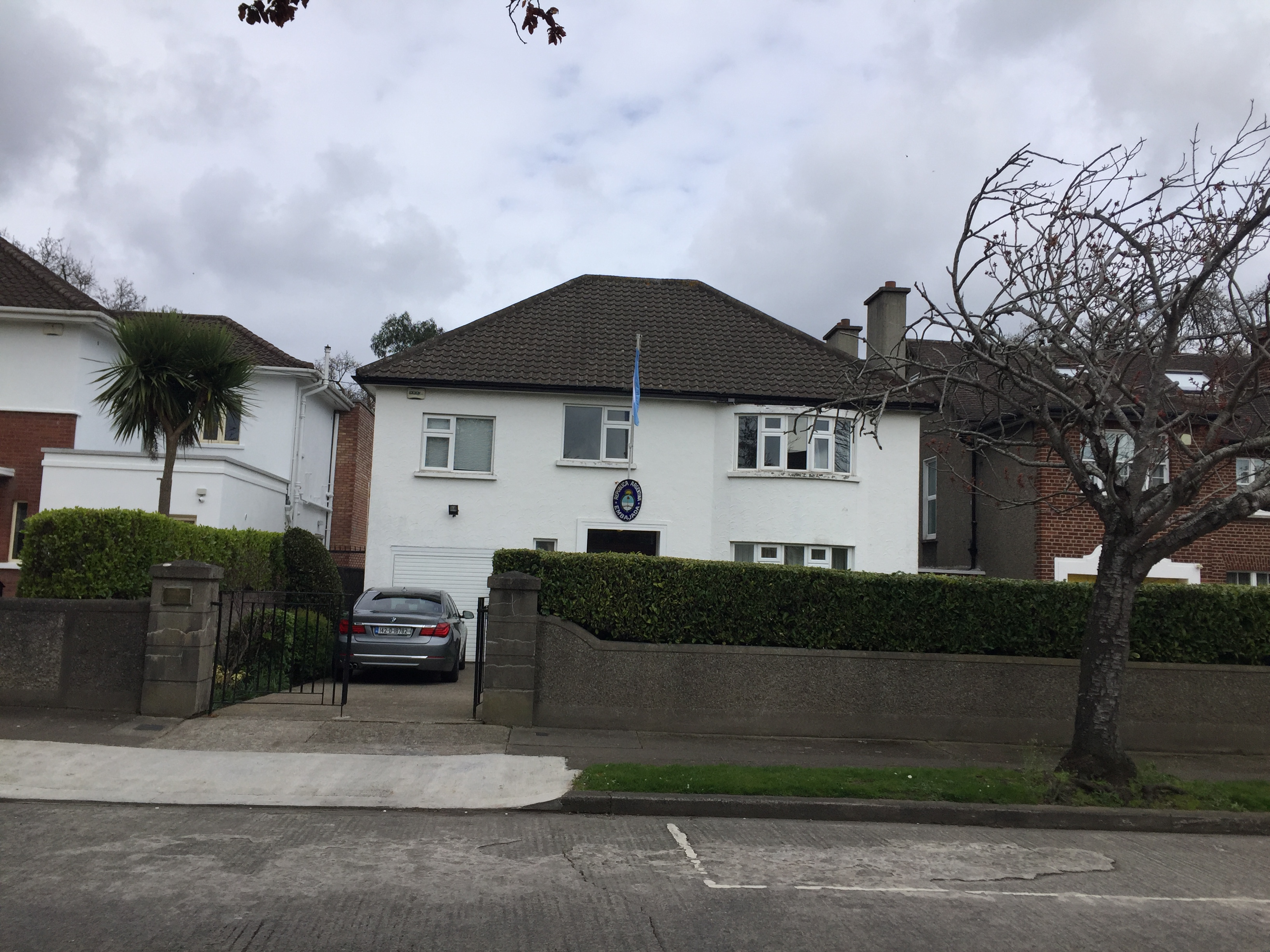
Embassy of Argentina in Dublin

== See also ==
- Foreign relations of Argentina
- Foreign relations of Ireland
- Irish Argentines
