= McAllister =

McAllister may refer to:

== People ==
- McAllister (surname)
- Clan MacAlister, Highland Scottish Clan and a branch of Clan Donald
- Justice McAllister (disambiguation)

== Places ==
- McAllister, Montana
- McAllister, Wisconsin
- Fort McAllister
- Fort McAllister Historic State Park

== Others ==
- Moving McAllister, film
