= People Are Wrong! =

2004 musical by Robin Goldwasser and Julia Greenberg

- Music: They Might Be Giants
- Productions: 2004 Off-Off-Broadway

People Are Wrong! is a 2004 Off-Broadway musical written by Robin Goldwasser and Julia Greenberg, and stars John Flansburgh, Robin Goldwasser's husband, of the band They Might Be Giants. It played Off-Broadway at the Vineyard Theatre from October 22, 2004 until December 11, 2004. The production starred John Flansburgh, Erin Hill, David Driver, Robin Goldwasser, Chris Anderson and Maggie Moore.

The show tells the story of a young New York couple who move to the country upstate and are tormented by Xanthus, a cult leader posing as a gardener/landscape artist. The story is told entirely in music, making this musical a rock opera.
