= McAlister =

McAlister is an Irish and Scottish surname. It is derived from the Gaelic Mac Alasdair, meaning "son of Alasdair". The personal name Alasdair is a Gaelic form of Alexander.

== People with the surname ==
- Barbara McAlister (diver) (born 1941), American diver
- Barbara McAlister (mezzo-soprano) (born 1941), Cherokee-American mezzo-soprano opera singer
- Chris McAlister (born 1977), American football cornerback
- Daniel McAlister (born 1978), Australian rules footballer
- Eric McAlister (born 2002), American football player
- Fred McAlister (1928–2008), American baseball player
- Hill McAlister (1875–1959), American politician
- Jim McAlister (American soccer) (born 1957), American soccer defender
- Jim McAlister (Scottish footballer) (born 1985), Scottish footballer
- John McAlister (1842–1918), Canadian politician
- Ken McAlister (born 1960), American football player
- Luke McAlister (born 1983), New Zealand rugby union footballer
- Mary McAlister (1896–1976), Scottish nurse
- Peter McAlister (1869–1938), Australian cricketer
- Michael McAlister (born 1976), NOAA Hurricane Hunters
- William King McAlister (1850–1923), justice of the Tennessee Supreme Court

== Fictional characters ==
- McKeyla McAlister, from the Netflix original series Project Mc²
- John Peter McAlister, Korean War Veteran and ninja master, from the NBC show, The Master (American TV series)

== See also ==
- Macalister
- Clan MacAlister
- McAlester (disambiguation), includes list of people with surname McAlester
- McAllister (surname), surname
