= Patrick Joseph Dillon =

Irish Catholic missionary priest

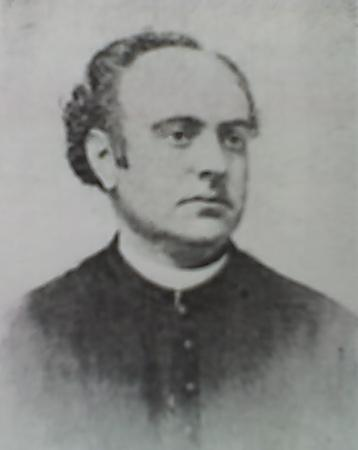
Patrick Joseph Dillon

Rev Patrick Edward Joseph Dillon (1841 – 11 June 1889) was an Irish Catholic priest, missionary in Argentina, politician and founder of The Southern Cross newspaper.

== Biography ==
Dillon was born in Tuam, County Galway, Ireland, in 1841, the eldest child of John Dillon and Julia Rigny. He was baptized on 24 April 1841. Dillon received his early education at school in Banagher, County Offaly and then entered the missionary seminary at All Hallows College, Dublin and was ordained priest on 25 October 1863. His education along with five other seminarians was funded by Fr Fahy the Chaplin of Buenos Aires.

In 1866, Fr. Dillon went to the Falkland Islands to minister to the approximately 200 Catholics there.

In 1871, he succeeded Father Fahy as Irish Chaplain of Buenos Aires.

In 1880, Dillon was elected provincial deputy to the Buenos Aires legislature with the sponsorship of the Autonomist Party and in 1883 he was elected national Senator for Buenos Aires.

He founded the Irish Catholic Association and the College Saint George in Argentina. The Monsignor Dillon Institute is named in his honor.

Fr. Dillon had a conflicting reputation among Irish-Argentines. According to Thomas Murray, Dillon was "much more popular with the rich than with the poor among his countrymen, and at that time [1877] there was a very considerable number of the two classes of our people in the Capital. ... The Canon did not measure up to the type of priest to whom the term Sagairt aruin [dear priest] is sincerely applied by the Irish. He was too much in politics for a city Chaplain" [Thomas Murray The Story of the Irish in Argentina, 1919, New York: P. J. Kenedy & Sons, page 397].

He returned to Ireland due to ill health and due in some part to the mistakes of the Dresden Affair that involved the organising of mass Irish emigration to Argentina.

Fr Dillon died in Dublin on 11 June 1889, age 48, and is buried at Glasnevin Cemetery,
