= Patrick McCarthy (footballer, born 1871) =

Irish sportsperson (1871–1963)

Patrick McCarthy (17 March 1871 – 10 August 1963) was an Irish footballer, boxer, referee, and sports teacher who was one of the founders of Argentine football clubs Boca Juniors.

== Early life ==
McCarthy was born in 1871 in Cashel, Republic of Ireland, and attended the Christian Brothers School. He was nicknamed "Paddy".

== Career ==
In 1900, McCarthy arrived in Argentina. He fought in the first professional boxing match in Argentina against Italian boxer Abelardo Robassio. He was regarded as being an important figure in the founding of Argentine side Boca. Before the club was officially established in the La Boca district of Buenos Aires in April 1905, Paddy McCarthy, taught the fundamentals and rules of the game to young local youths, including future Boca Juniors club players like Esteban Baglietto, so when these boys first set up the club they asked the Irishman to be its first manager. Like their Buenos Aires rivals, Vélez Sarsfield, who are named after jurist Dalmacio Vélez Sarsfield, Boca also trace their roots to an Irish connection from an era when the Irish Argentines community was at its zenith. After that, he worked as a football referee for eighteen years.
