= Kevin McAllister (disambiguation) =

Kevin McAllister (born 1962) is a Scottish footballer.

Kevin McAllister or Mac Allister or McCallister may refer to:

== People ==
- Kevin G. McAllister, American business executive, former president and CEO of Boeing Commercial Airplanes
- Kevin "Dis" McAllister, guitarist for Incite (band)
- Kevin Mac Allister (born 1997), Argentine footballer

== Other uses ==
- Kevin McCallister, the main character in several films from the Home Alone franchise
- "Kevin McCallister", a 2021 song by D-Block Europe from the mixtape Home Alone 2
