= David Driver =

American singer

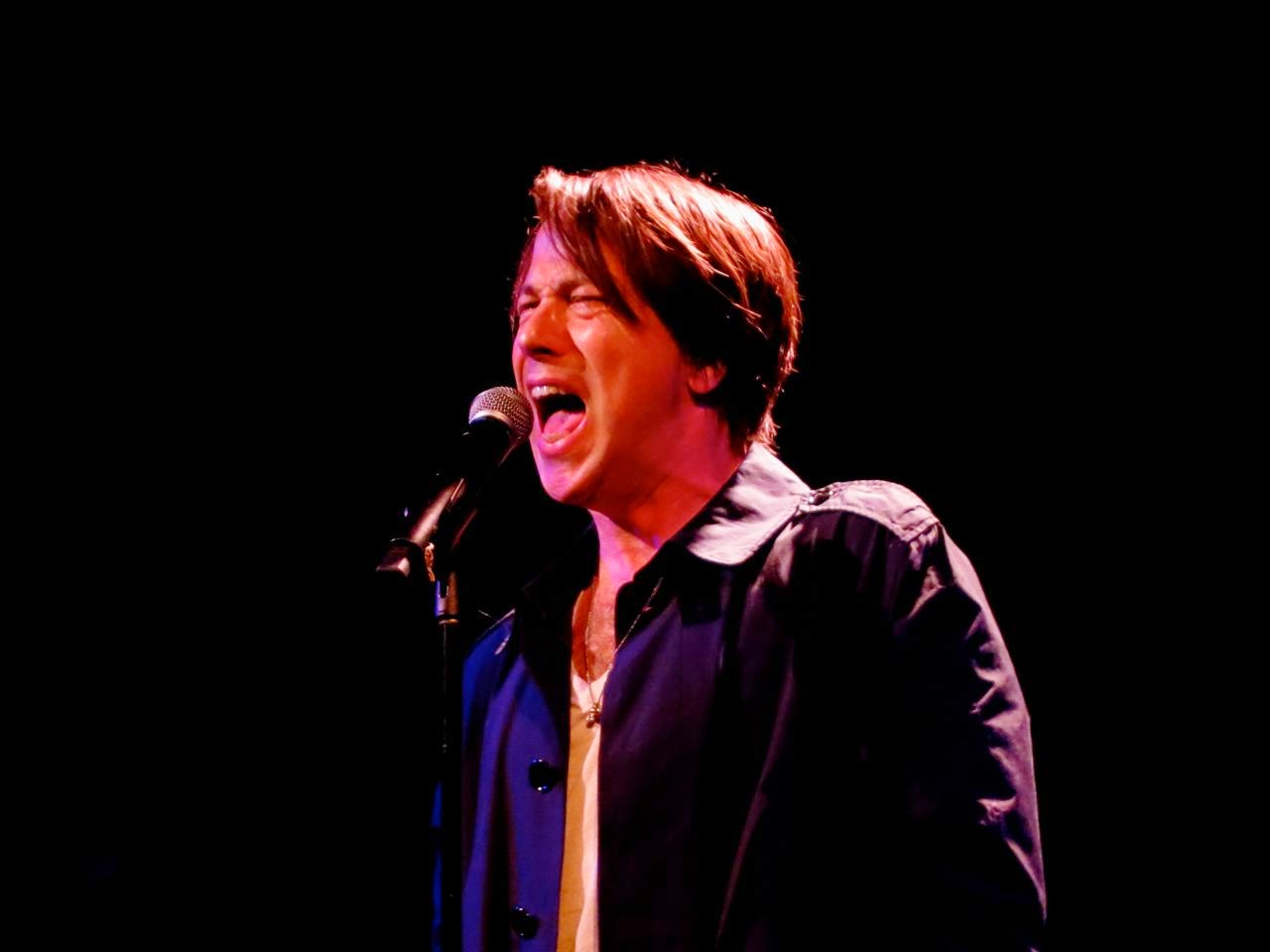
- Live at Joe's Pub in 2014
- Born: Syracuse, New York
- Occupations: Singer, Performer, Songwriter, Video Artist
- Partner: Jason Tougaw
- Website: daviddriver.com

David Driver is an American singer, performer, songwriter, and video artist. A staple on the downtown New York City music scene, he first achieved prominence in the mid-1990s, with his band MEOW, his role in Roy Nathanson’s Fire at Keaton’s Bar and Grill, and a stint as the understudy for the roles of Roger and Mark in the original Broadway cast of RENT. The Village Voice’s Rob Tannebaum credited Driver with creating “an oblique Downtown twist on saloon singing, devoid of melodrama, like Jerry Vale dreaming of Chet Baker.” The Advocate’s Andrew Velez wrote that Driver’s voice “is as bracing as a double Bourbon.”

== Early life ==
David Driver was born in Syracuse, New York and raised in Skaneateles, New York, the youngest of five children. When he was quite young, two of his siblings died in separate accidents; an experience which he has said marked him and shaped his world view. He knew from an early age that he wanted to perform. His mother was a visual artist, water safety instructor, and coach for The Barracudas, a women's synchronized swim team. His father grew up in a gothic mansion in Northampton, MA, served in World War II, worked as a traveling salesman, and eventually operated an industrial manufacturing facility. His early influences all combine glitter and grit: Deborah Harry, Detective David Starsky of TV's Starsky and Hutch, Liza Minnelli, Gladys Knight, Henry Mancini, and Queen.

Driver moved to New York City after high school and attended Parsons School of Design. In New York, he edited and authored the zine ‘Buddy’ with his partner, the writer Jason Tougaw.

== Music ==
Driver's first pop band, formed with Marty Beller (MEOW, They Might Be Giants) was The Scouts, whose first performance was at New York's legendary CBGB. In addition to MEOW and The Scouts, Driver has been frontman for Driver Quartet and one half of the duo Phillips & Driver, with Austin-based vocalist Gretchen Phillips. In 2015, he formed the electronica duo LuxRd., with composer Peter Kiesewalter. LuxRd. has a released single and video, “Get Your Fucking Hope Back,” a protest song released after the 2016 elections. Ian Pai (Fischerspooner, AVAN LAVA, Blue Man Group) produced a “Resistance Remix” of the song. James Matthew Daniel directed music videos for both versions. He also appears on recordings by They Might Be Giants, Roy Nathanson, Heidi Rodewald, and Julia Greenberg. More recently, he has collaborated with multi-instrumentalist Dana Lyn in the band 401(k). His recordings have been released by Enemy Records, Bar None, and Comma Records.

== Performance ==
Driver has been widely recognized for his intelligent, wry, and emotionally raw performance style.

With Grammy-nominated avant-jazz master Roy Nathanson, he has performed at New York's Lincoln Center, London's Royal Festival Hall, the Manchester Opera House, Utrechts Jazz Festival (Netherlands), and Amsterdam's Concertgebouw, alongside co-stars Debbie Harry, Elvis Costello, and Psychedelic Furs frontman Richard Butler. With Laurie Anderson and Lou Reed, he has toured in support of Anderson's album Homeland, and appeared with them on the Late Night Show with David Letterman. With singer-songwriter Mary McBride, he toured Iraq and Turkey, performing for civilians and troops, and conducting workshops on American musical idioms.

He portrayed lead characters Roger and Mark in the Original Broadway Cast of the Tony-winning Best Musical Rent. Subsequently, he toured Europe and the US with the satirical rock opera People Are Wrong!, in the lead role (written for him). The show, written by Robin Goldwasser and Julia Greenberg, co-created by, and starring members of, legendary ‘nerd-rock’ band They Might Be Giants, then had an extended run at New York's Vineyard Theater. Other theater credits include the Weimar musical The Blue Flower, at New York's Second Stage, and Bei Nacht, performed in NYC as well as at California's La Jolla Playhouse under the aegis of The Streisand Festival.

Driver performed The Scott Walker songbook as part of the Public Theater’s Joe’s Pub In The Park / SummerStage series at Central Park’s Delacorte Theater. At Lincoln Center and Brooklyn’s prestigious St. Ann’s Warehouse, he has performed the works of Burt Bacharach and Elvis Costello, and at Symphony Space he has performed with the cast and writers of the Tony-nominated Best Musical Passing Strange, which was subsequently turned into a film by Spike Lee. Driver is a fixture at Joe McGinty’s Loser’s Lounge series (Joe’s Pub, Fez, Lincoln Center, Westbeth Theater, Mass MOCA).

Driver plays the role of narrator and lead vocalist in The Good Swimmer, a theater piece co-written by Passing Strange’s Heidi Rodewald, which had its world premiere as part of Brooklyn Academy of Music's 2018 Next Wave Festival. In its review of the show, Feast of Music noted that Driver's "firm and steady singing always plugged directly into the emotion of each song," whereas The New York Times described him as "nimble voiced."

In 2016, he premiered the LuxRd. mixed media performance piece Welcome to My HAUS (with Peter Kiesewalter). In 2018, he launched early versions of MIXED MESSAGES | On Starsky (No Hutch), an autobiographical performance piece developed in collaboration with composer Dana Lyn and dramaturg Andi Stover.

Driver has been a featured vocalist / performer on The Daily Show (for which he sang the closing credits theme) and The Colbert Report (for which he portrayed an animated superhero), and has been the voice of commercial brands including Dunkin Donuts, Bridgestone Tires, Aveda, Estée Lauder, Johnson & Johnson, Discovery, and USA Network.

== Video ==
As a video artist, Driver has created, produced, and directed the web series This Park Is Mine (Planet Green Network) and Sometimes the Dream Is Real (SundanceTV). This Park Is Mine was originally commissioned in 2013 for a television network that was defunct shortly after its completion. It was re-released in 2019 after Driver regained ownership. The series stars Kate McKinnon and Nathan Phillips, and features Robin Goldwasser, Nick Amadeus, and John Flansburgh of They Might Be Giants.

He has also created short-form music/video content for clients like Discovery Communications, SundanceTV, Estée Lauder, and Johnson & Johnson. His SundanceTV interstitial piece ‘Smiling Fish’ was nominated for a 2008 Webby Award, and his ‘Week/Day’ series for them won the gold medal at the 2013 ProMaxBDA Awards.

== Discography ==
=== With MEOW ===
- Goalie For The Other Team (Enemy Records, 1995)

=== With Driver Quartet ===
- Night Time (Comma Records, 2001)
- Big And Strong And Lonely (Comma Records, 2000)

=== With Phillips & Driver ===
- Togetherness (Bar None Records, 2004)
- Disco Dance Party 2000 (2007)

=== With They Might Be Giants ===
- People Are Wrong! Original Cast Album (Written by Robin Goldwasser and Julia Greenberg; Sidesaddle Recordings, 2005)
- “Three Might Be Duende,” from the album Join Us (BMI, 2011).

=== With LuxRd. ===
- "Get Your Fucking Hope Back” (2016)
- "Get Your Fucking Hope Back" (Ian Pai Resistance Remix, 2016)
