= McCallister =

McCallister is a surname and a derivative of McAlister. Notable people with the surname include:

== Sports ==
- Blaine McCallister (born 1958), American golfer
- Bob McCallister (1934–2021), American golfer
- Charles McCallister (1903–1997), American water polo player
- Don McCallister (1904–1977), American football player
- Jack McCallister (1879–1946), American baseball coach

== Others ==
- John McCallister (born 1972), Northern Irish politician
- Lon McCallister (1923–2005), American actor
- Michael McCallister, American chief executive

=== Fictional characters ===
- Kevin McCallister, protagonist from the first two films of the Home Alone franchise
- Rufus McCallister, a character in Ninjago

== See also ==
- McCalister
- McAlester (disambiguation), includes a list of people with surname McAlester
