= Martín Maquieyra =

Argentine politician

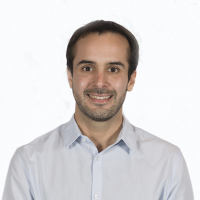

National Deputy
- Incumbent
- Assumed office 1 March 2016
- Constituency: La Pampa

Personal details
- Born: 10 November 1988 (age 37) General Pico, Argentina
- Party: Republican Proposal
- Other political affiliations: Juntos por el Cambio (2015–present)
- Education: Argentine Catholic University

Martín Maquieyra (born 10 November 1988) is an Argentine politician, currently serving as National Deputy elected in La Pampa since 2016. He is a member of Republican Proposal (PRO), and currently sits in the Juntos por el Cambio parliamentary bloc.

Originally sworn in as a replacement for Carlos Mac Allister, Maquieyra was elected in his own right in 2017 and re-elected in 2021.

== Early life and education ==
Maquieyra was born on 10 November 1988 in General Pico, La Pampa Province. He studied political sciences at the Pontifical Catholic University of Argentina, graduating in 2015.

Maquieyra's brother, Juan Ignacio Maquieyra, is also active in politics as part of Republican Proposal and works for the Buenos Aires city government.

== Political career ==
Maquieyra became involved in politics in La Generación Argentina, a youth group organised within the Republican Proposal (PRO) party. He would eventually become the group's secretary general. Later, he served as a legislative aide for national deputy Carlos Mac Allister.

=== National deputy ===
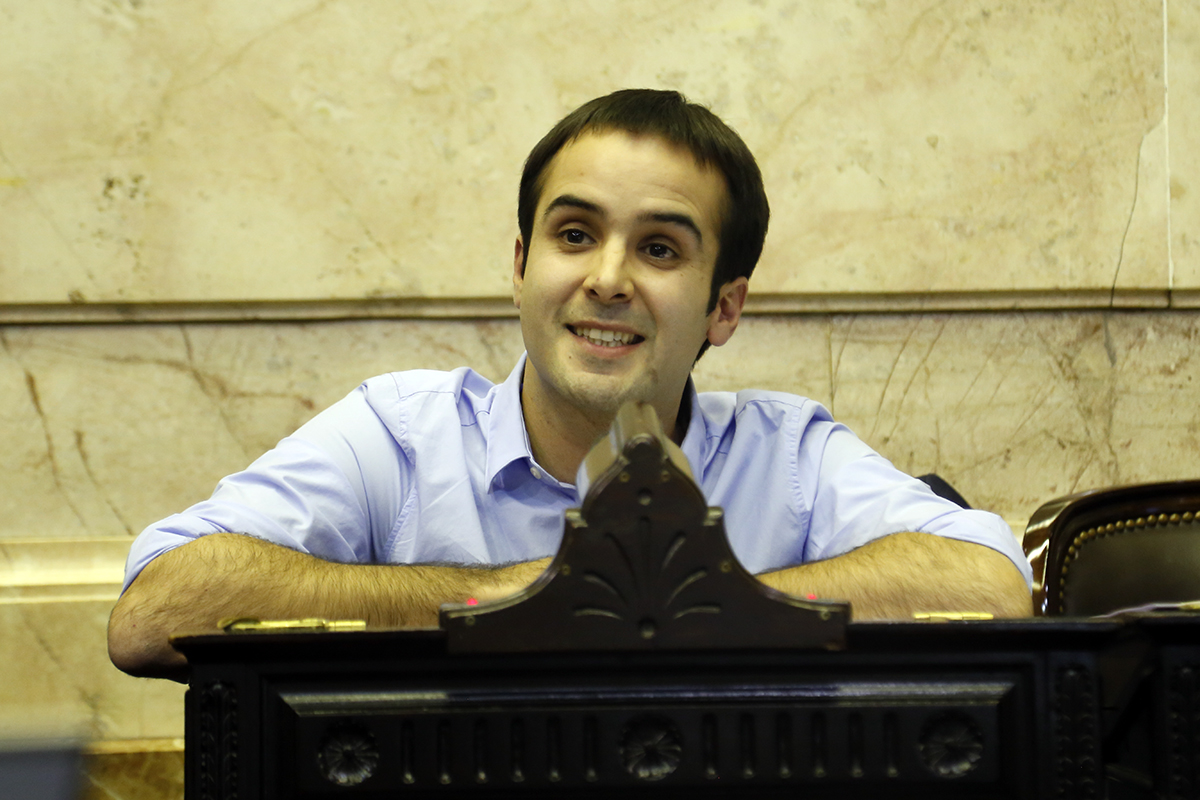
Maquieyra during the 2018 debate on the legalisation of abortion.

In the 2013 legislative election, Maquieyra was the third candidate in the "Frente Propuesta Federal" list, behind Mac Allister and Adriana Leher. With 19.33% and placing third in the general election, the list received enough votes for only Mac Allister to be elected to the National Chamber of Deputies. In 2016, Mac Allister was appointed Secretary of Sports by President Mauricio Macri; as Laher had previously been elected to the La Pampa provincial legislature, Maquieyra was called upon to fill in Mac Allister's vacancy. Upon being sworn in on 3 March 2016, aged 27, he became the youngest congressman at the time. He formed part of the parliamentary commissions on Education, Agriculture and Livestock, and Transport.

Maquieyra ran for re-election in the 2017 legislative election. His PRO list faced off in the Cambiemos P.A.S.O. primaries against two Radical Civic Union lists, and won, making him the first candidate in the Cambiemos list that competed in the general election. With 45.39% of the vote, Cambiemos was the second-most voted list in the general election, allowing Maquieyra to be re-elected.

During his 2017–2021 term, Maquieyra constituted part of the parliamentary commissions on Housing and Urban Planning, Foreign Affairs and Worship, Economy, Agriculture and Livestock, and Mercosur. He was an opponent of the legalisation of abortion in Argentina, voting against the two Voluntary Interruption of Pregnancy bills debated by the Argentine Congress in 2018 and 2020, the latter of which passed and made abortion legal in the country.
