= The Southern Cross (Argentina) =

- Type: Monthly newspaper
- Publisher: Dr. Guillermo MacLoughlin Bréard
- Founded: 1875
- Headquarters: Ríobamba 451 (4°C); Buenos Aires
- Website: https://thesoutherncross.info/

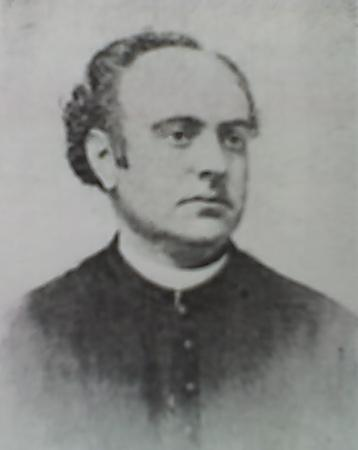
Patrick Joseph Dillon

The Southern Cross is an Argentine newspaper founded on January 16, 1875, by Patrick Joseph Dillon (1842–1889), a Roman Catholic priest, editor and politician, born in Tuam, east County Galway, Ireland. Fr. Dillon was appointed a deputy for Buenos Aires Province and president of the Presidential Affairs Commission amongst other positions. He was one of the legislators who proposed Buenos Aires as the federal capital.

The Southern Cross was the first entirely Roman Catholic English language publication in Buenos Aires, and continues in print to this day on a monthly basis. A downloadable version can be obtained at The Southern Cross website.

Published by Editorial Irlandesa S.A., the paper provides readers with a beginners' guide to the Irish language, helping Irish Argentines keep in touch with their cultural heritage.
