= Jason Tougaw =

Author and professor of English

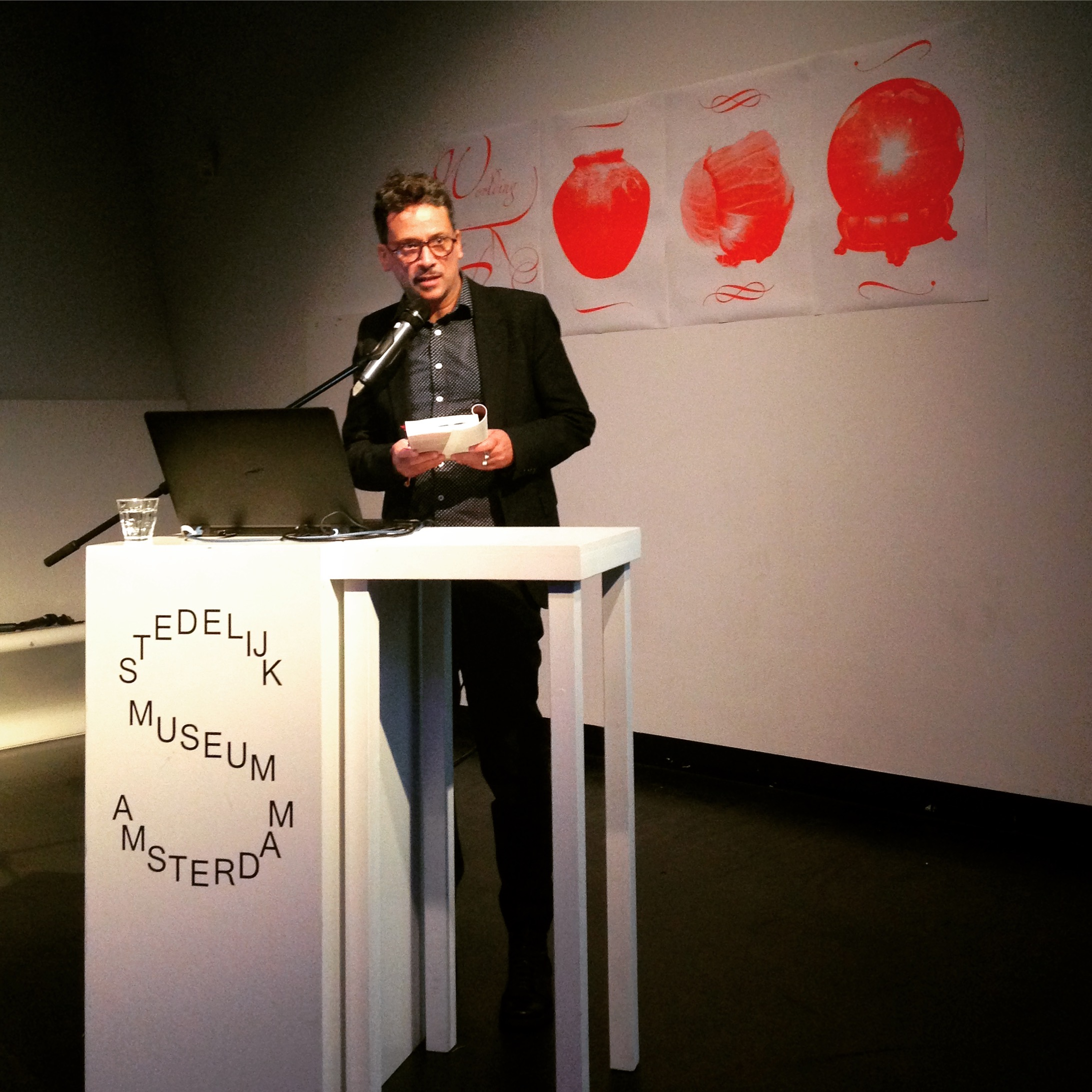
- Jason Tougaw at the Stedelijk Museum in Amsterdam, as part of the Worlding the Brain Conference (2017)
- Education: UCLA, The CUNY Graduate Center
- Occupations: Author, Professor of English
- Partner: David Driver

Jason Tougaw is an American author known for his memoir The One You Get and The Elusive Brain, a non-fiction account of neuroscience's cultural influence.

Tougaw was raised in San Diego, California. He attended San Pasqual High School. He graduated from UCLA. He received a PhD from The CUNY Graduate Center. He teaches writing and literature at Queens College and the CUNY Graduate Center. He has also taught at American University and Princeton University.

Tougaw's essays have been published in OUT magazine, DV8, Largehearted Boy, Literary Hub, Electric Literature, Modern Fiction Studies, Literature and Medicine, and The Quivering Pen. He writes a regular column for Psychology Today. He hosts a weekly music show – The Mixtape – on public radio station WJFF in Jeffersonville, New York.

== The One You Get ==
The One You Get tells the story of growing up gay and poor in 1970s Southern California. Tougaw was in the shadow of his family's former wealth and celebrity. His grandfather, Ralph Neves, was a notorious and successful jockey. His parents’ generation “dropped out,” became hippies’ and rejected their parents’ values and lifestyle, just as the family money dried up. They book chronicles the chaos, domestic abuse, addiction, and mental illness that shaped Tougaw's childhood. Like much of his other work, the memoir is the story of what it means—and feels like—to be a human animal, shaped by mysteries of physiology, history, politics, and sexuality. The story is punctuated with “neurological vignettes.” Tougaw's family's mantra was “there’s something wrong with our blood, and it affects their brains.” In his retelling of the family mythology, Tougaw uses his expertise in the science of the brain to explore his family story down to the cellular level. Ultimately, it's 1980s new wave music and culture that saves Tougaw as a teenager, promising a world beyond the chaos of his family or the stifling conformity of his high school. A high school guidance counselor took one look at Tougaw's dyed hair and makeup and told him he would never make it to UCLA, dropping him from his college prep courses. Ultimately, it was Tougaw's love of music and literature that enabled him to achieve his vague teenage goals.

== The Elusive Brain ==
The Elusive Brain is the story of neuroscience's enormous cultural influence during the early part of the twenty-first century. Focusing on literary responses to neuroscience, Tougaw argues that literature can play with and experiment with the big questions that elude empirical studies: What is the relation between brain and self? How does neurodiversity shape human culture? What accounts for the “explanatory gap” between brain physiology and perceptual experience? He examines these questions at work in neuronovels, brain memoirs, and graphic narratives, by writers like Oliver Sacks, Temple Grandin, Siri Hustvedt, Tito Rajarshi Mukhopadhyay, Christopher Haddon, Maud Casey, Jonathan Lethem, and Ellen Forney. He also discusses the work of philosophers Alva Noë, Catherine Malabou, David Chalmers, and Patricia Churchland as well as the research of neuroscientists Joseph Ledoux, Michael Gazzaniga, Antonio Damasio, Sebastian Seung, and Stanislas Dehaene. The Elusive Brain was named an Outstanding Academic Title for 2018 by Choice magazine.

== Publications ==
- The Elusive Brain: Literary Experiments in the Age of Neuroscience (Yale University Press 2018)
- The One You Get: Portrait of a Family Organism (Dzanc Books 2017)
- Strange Cases: The Medical Case History and the British Novel (Routledge 2006)
- Extremities: Trauma, Testimony, and Community (University of Illinois Press 2002), an anthology co-edited with Nancy K. Miller

== Awards ==
- 2016 Dzanc Prize for Nonfiction, The One You Get.
- Choice Magazine Outstanding Academic Title for 2018, The Elusive Brain.
- Mellon Foundation Fellowship in Science Studies, The CUNY Graduate Center 2011.
