= From Boys to Men =

2006 anthology of essays

From Boys to Men: Gay Men Write About Growing Up
- Author: Ted Gideonse; Rob Williams
- Language: English
- Genre: Anthology
- Publisher: Carroll & Graf
- Publication date: 2006
- Publication place: United States
- Media type: Hardcover

From Boys to Men: Gay Men Write About Growing Up (ISBN 0786716320) is an anthology of essays about growing up gay. It was edited by Ted Gideonse and Rob Williams and published by Carroll & Graf in 2006.

== Contributors ==
- Michael McAllister — "Sleeping Eros"
- K.M. Soehnlein — "The Story I Told Myself"
- Tom Dolby — "Preppies Are My Weekness"
- Eric Karl Anderson — "Barbie Girls"
- Raymonde C. Green — "Signs"
- David Bahr — "No Matter What Happens"
- Todd Pozycki — "The Lives and Deaths of Buffalo Butt"
- Alexander Chee — "Dick"
- Trebor Healey — "The Updshot"
- Austin Bunn — "Guide"
- Joe Jervis — "Terrence"
- Horehound Sillpoint — "The Boy with the Questions and the Kid with the Answers"
- Viet Dinh — "A Brief History of Industrial Music"
- Michael Gardner — "The Competitive Lives of Twin Gays"
- Francis Strand — "Five Stories About Francis"
- Vestal McIntyre — "Mom-voice"
- D. Travers Scott — "Growing Up in Horror"
- Lee Houck — "Inheritance"
- Aaron Hamburger — "Whatever Happened to..."
- Mike McGinty — "Peristalsis"
- Jason Tougaw — "Aplysia californica"
