= McCalister =

McCalister is a surname. Notable people with the surname include:

- Alex McCalister (born 1993), American football player
- Tanner McCalister (born 2000), American football player
- Tim McCalister (born 1964), American basketball player

== See also ==
- McCallister, surname
- McAlester (disambiguation), includes a list of people with surname McAlester
