= Justice McAllister =

Justice McAllister or McAlister may refer to:

- Archibald G. McAlister (1873–1950), associate justice of the Arizona Supreme Court
- Thomas Francis McAllister (1896–1976), associate justice of the Michigan Supreme Court
- William King McAlister (1850–1923), associate justice of the Tennessee Supreme Court
- William K. McAllister (1818–1888), associate justice of the Supreme Court of Illinois
- William M. McAllister (1905–1986), associate justice of the Oregon Supreme Court
