= Anthony Dominic Fahy =

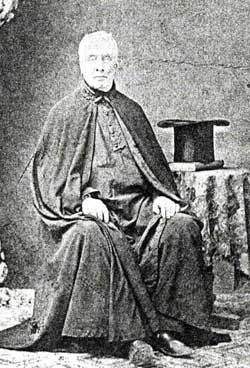
Anthony Fahy with his top hat (c.1860s)

Anthony Dominic Fahy (11 January 1805 – 20 February 1871) was an Irish Dominican Priest, missionary and head of the Irish community in Argentina between 1844 and 1871.

== Life ==
Anthony Dominic Fahy (or Fahey) was born on 11 January 1805 in Loughrea, County Galway, Ireland.

He joined the dominican order and was professed in Esker Friary, Co. Galway in 1828, and was ordained priest on 19 March 1831, in Rome. Between 1834 and 1836 he lived and worked with his Dominican brothers in the Saint Joseph Convent, in Somerset, Ohio. In 1836 he returned to Ireland.

In 1843, Fahy was appointed by the Archbishop of Dublin Daniel Murray to the Irish chaplaincy of Buenos Aires in place of father Patrick O'Gorman.

In a short time Fahy became leader of the Irish community in Argentina and, as himself wrote, he acted as consul, postmaster, financial adviser, marriage counselor, matchmaker, judge, interpreter and employment agent for the members of his community.

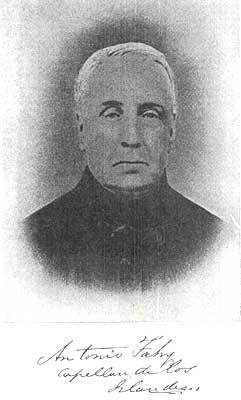
Anthony Fahy

Fahy organized his flock in chaplaincies in Buenos Aires province, and appointed twelve Irish priests to these areas.

In 1847 Fahy organized a fundraising campaign and collected £411 for the victims of the Irish famine.

Fahy was a fervent supporter of Juan Manuel de Rosas’ regime and he approved Rosas' decision to execute Camila O'Gorman in 1848.

Fr. Fahy sponsored the training of a number of priests from Ireland, in All Hallows College, Dublin, for the Argeintine mission, these included Fr. Patrick Joseph Dillon, Fr. Patrick Lynch, Fr. Thomas Carolan, Fr. John Baptist Leahy, Fr. Thomas Mulleady, Fr. Felix O'Callaghan, and Fr. Edmund Flannery.

Anthony Fahy died of a heart attack on 20 February 1871; according to other sources he was victim of a cholera outbreak that killed thousands of people in Buenos Aires in 1871. Fahy was buried in La Recoleta Cemetery.

After his death Father Fahy was succeeded by Father Patrick Joseph Dillon as Irish Chaplain of Buenos Aires.

== Places named after Joseph Fahy ==
Two streets —in La Reja, (Moreno Partido) and Capilla del Señor— bear his name. Instituto Fahy, a Catholic school located in Moreno, was also named after him; the journalist and writer Rodolfo Walsh was alumni of this school. In the association of ex-alumni of the "Instituto Fahy" is located the practice centre of "Celtic Argentina", an Argentinian stepdancing group.

== See also ==
- Dominicans in Ireland
