= Patricio Mac Allister =

Argentinian footballer

Personal information
- Full name: Carlos Patricio Mac Allister
- Date of birth: 20 March 1966 (age 60)
- Place of birth: Santa Rosa, La Pampa, Argentina
- Position: Forward

Senior career*
| Years | Team | Apps | (Gls) |
| 1984–1987 | Estudiantes de La Plata | | |
| 1987–1988 | Deportivo Maipú | | |
| 1988–1991 | Estudiantes de La Plata | | |
| 1991–1992 | Mitsubishi Motors | | |
| 1992–1993 | Argentinos Juniors | | |
| 1993–1994 | Correcaminos | 23 | (1) |
| 1995 | Aldosivi | | |
| 1996–1999 | General Belgrano de Santa Rosa | | |
- * Club domestic league appearances and goals

Carlos Patricio Mac Allister (born 20 March 1966) is an Argentine former professional footballer who played as a forward for clubs in Argentina, Mexico and Japan.

== Career ==
Born in Santa Rosa, La Pampa, Mac Allister began playing football with local side General Belgrano de Santa Rosa. He made his Primera debut with Estudiantes de la Plata in 1989. He also played in the first team of Argentinos Juniors.

Mac Allister had a spell in Mexico with Correcaminos UAT and then moved to Japan to play for Mitsubishi Motors.

== Post-playing career ==
In 1998, the Mac Allister brothers, Carlos Javier and Carlos Patricio, decided to found their own sports club for youngsters, the MacAllister Sports Club. They acquired a four-hectare piece of land situated 5 km away from the centre of the city of Santa Rosa, La Pampa, where they built their own club to instruct and promote soccer players for their subsequent insertion into professional soccer. Patricio Mac Allister served as coach of the club's youth teams since 1999, and has also coached for General Belgrano de Santa Rosa and the youth teams of Argentinos Juniors.

== Personal life ==
Mac Allister is the older brother of former professional footballer Carlos Mac Allister, and he has three nephews who are also professional footballers: Alexis, Francis and Kevin. Mac Allister is of Irish and Italian descent. Although assumed to be of Scottish heritage, Mac Allister's family origins were instead from the Irish town of Donabate.
