= Francis Mac Allister =

Argentine footballer (born 1995)

Personal information
- Full name: Francis Manuel Mac Allister
- Date of birth: 30 October 1995 (age 31)
- Place of birth: Buenos Aires, Argentina
- Height: 1.76 m (5 ft 9 in)
- Position: Midfielder

Team information
- Current team: Deportes La Serena
- Number: 4

Youth career
- Argentinos Juniors

Senior career*
Years	Team	Apps	(Gls)
2016–2020	Argentinos Juniors	48	(1)
2016	→ Boca Unidos (loan)	4	(1)
2020–2024	Talleres	35	(0)
2022–2024	→ Rosario Central (loan)	36	(1)
2024–2026	Argentinos Juniors	18	(0)
2025	→ Instituto (loan)	22	(0)
2026–	Deportes La Serena	1	(0)
- * Club domestic league appearances and goals as of 8 February 2026

Francis Manuel Mac Allister (born 30 October 1995) is an Argentine professional footballer who plays as a midfielder for Liga de Primera club Deportes La Serena.

== Career ==
Mac Allister, like his two brothers, started his career with Argentinos Juniors. Mac Allister's debut for the club came on 15 May 2016 in an Argentine Primera División draw with Lanús. He made a second appearance six days later, against Atlético de Rafaela, in a season which ended in relegation for Argentinos. In the following season, Mac Allister joined Boca Unidos of Primera B Nacional on loan. His first appearance for Boca was in a 0–0 with Flandria on 8 October, prior to scoring his first goal in November versus Independiente Rivadavia. He returned to Argentinos in 2017, going on to appear sixty-seven times.

In November 2020, Mac Allister signed for fellow Primera División side Talleres. In June 2022, Mac Allister moved to fellow league club Rosario Central.

In February 2026, Mac Allister moved abroad and signed with Chilean club Deportes La Serena.

== Personal life ==
Mac Allister is of predominantly Irish descent, with some Scottish ancestry as well. His Irish ancestry can be traced back to Donabate, County Dublin, and his Scottish ancestry can be traced back to Tarbert, Kintyre. Mac Allister's Scottish forefather Charles McAllister, a Protestant who converted to Catholicism, had temporarily moved to Donabate from the Scottish town of Tarbert in the 18th century. Charles' descendant Joseph McAllister emigrated from Donabate in 1865 to acquire farmland in Argentina, where the family name was changed to Mac Allister. In addition, he also has some Italian ancestry through his maternal grandmother, whose roots trace back to Belmonte del Sannio, Isernia.

Mac Allister's two younger brothers, Kevin and Alexis, are also professional footballers; Alexis is a 2022 FIFA World Cup winner with Argentina. They are the sons of Carlos Mac Allister and nephews of Patricio Mac Allister. His cousin Luciano Guaycochea is also a professional footballer.

== Career statistics ==
As of 6 November 2020

Appearances and goals by club, season and competition
Club	Season	League			National cup		League cup		Continental		Other		Total	
Club	Season	Division	Apps	Goals	Apps	Goals	Apps	Goals	Apps	Goals	Apps	Goals	Apps	Goals
Argentinos Juniors	2016	Primera División	2	0	0	0	—		—		0	0	2	0
Argentinos Juniors	2016–17	Primera B Nacional	0	0	0	0	—		—		0	0	0	0
Argentinos Juniors	2017–18	Primera División	17	0	0	0	—		—		0	0	17	0
Argentinos Juniors	2018–19	Primera División	7	0	1	0	7	0	3 (Note: Appearance(s) in the Copa Sudamericana)	0	0	0	18	0
Argentinos Juniors	2019–20	Primera División	21	1	3	0	1	0	4	0	0	0	29	1
Argentinos Juniors	2020–21	Primera División	1	0	0	0	0	0	0	0	0	0	1	0
Argentinos Juniors	Total		48	1	4	0	8	0	7	0	0	0	67	1
Boca Unidos (loan)	2016–17	Primera B Nacional	4	1	0	0	—		—		0	0	4	1
Talleres	2020–21	Primera División	0	0	0	0	0	0	0	0	0	0	0	0
Career total			52	1	4	0	8	0	7	0	0	0	71	1

== Honours ==
Argentinos Juniors

- Primera B Nacional: 2016–17
