= Alexis Mac Allister =

Argentine footballer (born 1998)

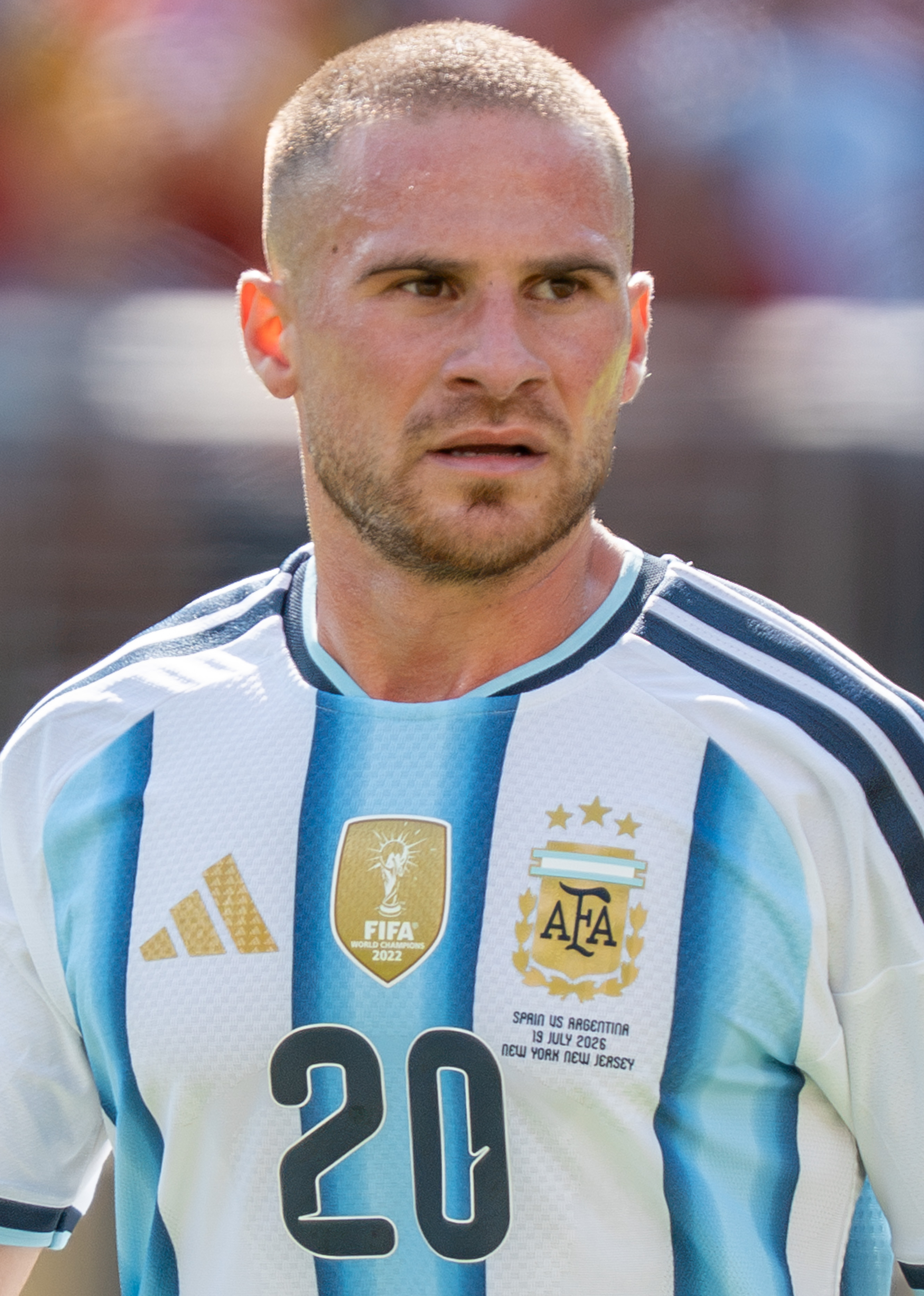
- Mac Allister with Argentina in 2026

Personal information
- Full name: Alexis Mac Allister
- Date of birth: 24 December 1998 (age 27)
- Place of birth: Santa Rosa, La Pampa, Argentina
- Height: 1.76 m (5 ft 9 in)
- Position: Midfielder

Team information
- Current team: Liverpool
- Number: 10

Youth career
- Club Social y Deportivo Parque
- –2016: Argentinos Juniors

Senior career*
Years	Team	Apps	(Gls)
2016–2019	Argentinos Juniors	58	(8)
2019–2023	Brighton & Hove Albion	98	(16)
2019	→ Argentinos Juniors (loan)	10	(2)
2019–2020	→ Boca Juniors (loan)	13	(1)
2023–	Liverpool	116	(13)

International career^{‡}
2020–2021	Argentina Olympic	9	(5)
2019–	Argentina	59	(8)
Medal record
Men's football
Representing Argentina
FIFA World Cup
Winner	2022 Qatar
Runner-up	2026 Canada–Mexico–US
Copa América
Winner	2024 United States
CONMEBOL–UEFA Cup of Champions
Winner	2022 England
CONMEBOL Pre-Olympic Tournament
Winner	2020 Colombia
- * Club domestic league appearances and goals as of 22 November 2026 (UTC) ‡ National team caps and goals as of 17 November 2026 (UTC)

Alexis Mac Allister (Note: Spanish: [aˈleksis maˈkalisteɾ] Irish English: [mək ˈalɪstəɹ]) (born 24 December 1998) is an Argentine professional footballer who plays as a midfielder for Premier League club Liverpool and the Argentina national team. He has been praised for his passing range, tactical awareness, and ability to control the tempo of play.

Mac Allister started his senior career with Argentinos Juniors in 2016, winning the 2016–17 Argentine Second Division in his debut season. He joined Brighton & Hove Albion in 2019 but was immediately loaned back to them until the end of the season and later to Boca Juniors, where he won the 2019–20 Primera División. Returning from the loan the following season, Mac Allister had his breakthrough year for Brighton, becoming a key player for the team, before moving to Liverpool in June 2023, where he won the 2023–24 EFL Cup and the 2024–25 Premier League.

Mac Allister represented Argentina at under-23 level, winning the 2020 CONMEBOL Pre-Olympic Tournament and playing at the 2020 Summer Olympics. He made his senior international debut in 2019 and was part of the Argentina squads that won the 2022 Finalissima, 2022 FIFA World Cup, and 2024 Copa América.

== Early and personal life ==
Alexis Mac Allister was born on 24 December 1998 in Santa Rosa, La Pampa. Mac Allister's older brothers Francis and Kevin are also footballers. They are the sons of Carlos Mac Allister and nephews of Patricio Mac Allister, both retired footballers. His cousin, Luciano Guaycochea, is also a footballer.

Mac Allister has Irish ancestry, with roots in Donabate, County Dublin. He also has Scottish ancestry through his forefather Charles McAllister, a Protestant who converted to Catholicism and moved to Donabate from the Scottish town of Tarbert, Kintyre in the 18th century. Charles' descendant Joseph McAllister emigrated from Donabate in 1865 to acquire farmland in Argentina, where the family name was changed to Mac Allister. Additionally, he has Italian ancestry through his maternal grandmother, whose roots trace back to Belmonte del Sannio, Isernia.

On 22 September 2025, Mac Allister's girlfriend Ailen Cova announced the birth of their daughter.

== Club career ==
=== Argentinos Juniors ===
Like his two brothers, Mac Allister started his career with Club Social y Deportivo Parque before joining Argentinos Juniors' youth setup. He made his first-team debut on 30 October 2016, coming on as a second-half substitute for Iván Colman in a 0–0 Primera B Nacional home draw against Central Córdoba. Mac Allister scored his first goal on 10 March 2017, in a 2–1 away loss against Instituto. He contributed with three goals in 23 appearances during his first senior campaign, as his team achieved promotion to Primera División as champions. He made his debut in the latter category on 9 September, starting in a 2–1 loss at Patronato.

On 25 November 2017, Mac Allister and his two brothers all played together for the first time in a 1–0 loss at San Lorenzo; Alexis and Francis were starters, while Kevin came on as a substitute. He scored his first goal in the top tier on 5 March 2018, with the opener in a 2–0 home win over Boca Juniors.

=== Brighton & Hove Albion ===
==== 2019–2020: Loans back to Argentina ====
On 24 January 2019, Mac Allister signed for Premier League club Brighton & Hove Albion on a four-and-a-half-year contract. As part of the deal, Mac Allister was loaned back to Argentinos Juniors for the remainder of the 2018–19 Premier League season. In June 2019, Boca Juniors completed the loan signing of Mac Allister, linking him up with brother Kevin, who had joined the club on loan six months prior. Mac Allister scored on his Boca debut, with the team's only goal in the first leg of a Copa Libertadores round of sixteen victory over Athletico Paranaense on 25 July. On 5 August, Mac Allister played his first league game for Boca as he came on as a substitute in a 2–0 away victory against Patronato. His loan at Boca was brought to an early end by Brighton on 31 January 2020.

==== 2020–2022: Breakthrough and emergence ====
Mac Allister made his debut for Brighton as an 80th-minute substitute in a 0–0 draw away to Wolverhampton Wanderers on 7 March 2020. This match proved to be Brighton's last until the Premier League restart in June due to the COVID-19 pandemic. Mac Allister played his first home game for Brighton where he came on as a substitute in a 2–1 victory over Arsenal on 20 June. He made his first start for Brighton three days later, in a 0–0 draw away against Leicester City, playing 58 minutes before being substituted. Mac Allister scored his first Brighton goal on 17 September 2020, with in a header in a 4–0 home victory over Portsmouth in the EFL Cup. He scored again six days later, this goal also coming in the EFL Cup where Brighton claimed a 2–0 away victory over Preston North End. On 18 October, Mac Allister scored his first Premier League goal, a 90th-minute leveller, in a 1–1 away draw against bitter rivals Crystal Palace.

Mac Allister scored the winner and his second-ever Premier League goal as Brighton fought back from a goal behind to beat Burnley 2–1 away on 14 August in the opening game of the 2021–22 season. He supplied assists to both of Aaron Connolly's goals on 22 September, in the 2–0 home victory over Swansea City in the EFL Cup third round. He later went off injured. Mac Allister scored his second goal of the season on 23 October, with an 81st-minute penalty in a 4–1 home defeat to Manchester City. He scored his first brace in a 3–2 away win over Everton on 2 January 2022, putting Brighton 1–0 up in the third minute, and putting them 3–1 up in the 71st with a shot from the edge of the penalty area. Mac Allister provided Adam Webster's headed equaliser from a corner in a 1–1 home draw against the European champions, Chelsea, on 18 January.

==== 2022–2023: Club talisman and European qualification ====
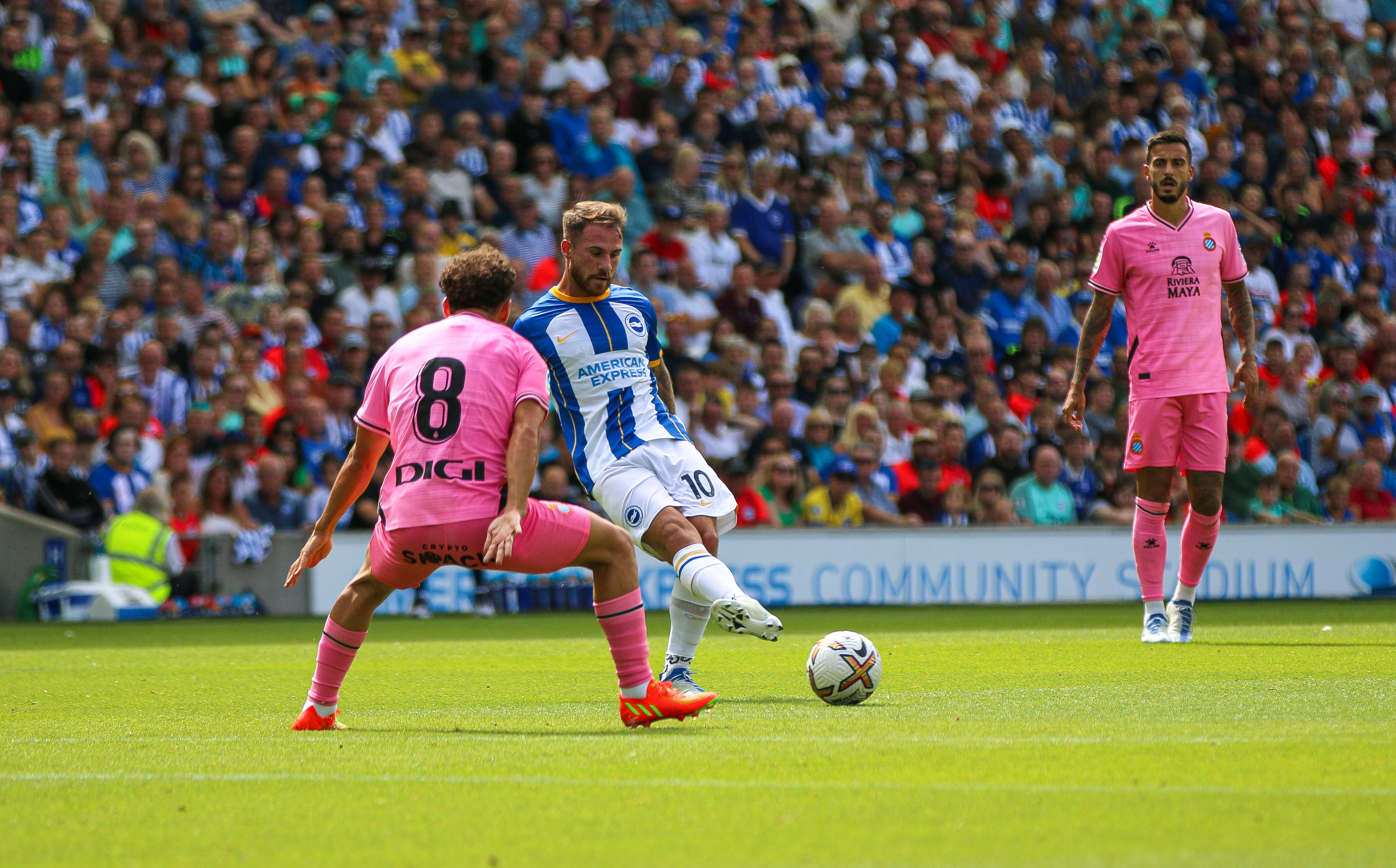
Mac Allister playing for Brighton & Hove Albion in 2022

In Brighton's opening game of the 2022–23 season against Manchester United, Mac Allister scored an own goal in a 2–1 victory that saw Brighton claim their first ever win at Old Trafford. Two weeks later, Mac Allister scored from the penalty spot in the 2–0 away win over West Ham United, and scored another penalty in a 2–1 defeat at Fulham. Mac Allister scored a brace including a third penalty in four games after having a goal ruled out by VAR in a 5–2 home win over Leicester City. On 24 October, Mac Allister signed a new contract, committing him to Brighton until at least June 2025, with an option for an additional year.

Mac Allister returned after his World Cup victory on 4 January 2023 in a 4–1 away victory over Everton, where he came on as a substitute in the 62nd minute. On 7 January, he scored a brace in a 5–1 away win over EFL Championship team Middlesbrough in the third round of the 2022–23 FA Cup. On 14 January, his first return to Brighton's Falmer Stadium since the World Cup, Mac Allister wore his winner's medal as he walked out onto the pitch ahead of the match against Liverpool. Brighton went on to win the match 3–0. On 23 April, Brighton were eliminated from the FA Cup in a 7–6 penalty shoot-out defeat to Manchester United. On 4 May, Mac Allister scored a 99th-minute penalty against Manchester United to win the game for Brighton. After the end of the 2022–23 season, in which Brighton finished 6th and qualified for the UEFA Europa League and in which he was Brighton's top scorer with 10 goals, Mac Allister was heavily linked with a transfer to Liverpool. On 1 June, Mac Allister was voted as Brighton player of the season by users of BBC Sport. He was shortlisted in the UEFA Men's Player of the Year award for the season, coming in 10th after receiving 12 points in ranked voting.

=== Liverpool ===
==== 2023–2024 season ====
On 8 June 2023, Mac Allister signed for fellow Premier League club Liverpool on a five-year contract for an undisclosed transfer fee, reported to be an initial £35 million and a total of £55 million including add-on fees. On 13 August, he made his debut for the club in a 1–1 draw against Chelsea in the Premier League. On 19 August, during a home match against Bournemouth, Mac Allister received a red card for a foul on Ryan Christie which was criticised by analysts, opposition manager and fans. On 21 August, Liverpool announced their appeal and on 22 August the decision was successfully rescinded. On 24 September 2023, Mac Allister provided his first competitive assist for Liverpool with a long clipped ball for Darwin Núñez in a 3–1 victory against West Ham United. On 5 October, he shared the pitch with his brother Kevin after the former came on as a substitute in the 46th minute in a Europa League group stage match against Union Saint-Gilloise. Mac Allister scored his first goal for Liverpool on 3 December in a 4–3 win over Fulham, with a shot 30 yards from the goal. The goal was voted the Premier League Goal of the Month for December, and later Liverpool's Goal of the Season for 2023–24. On 25 February, Mac Allister started in the EFL Cup final and was substituted in the 87th minute before overtime in the 1–0 win over Chelsea. He was named Liverpool's Player of the Month for March with key contributions across competitions.

On his time under manager Jürgen Klopp's final season, Mac Allister added "I played as a lone five [holding midfielder]. I was much more defensive than anything else. We were used to being very direct and perhaps played more long balls."

==== 2024–2025 season ====
During the 2024–25 season, Mac Allister continued to be a consistent starting midfielder under new manager Arne Slot. He made his UEFA Champions League debut on 17 September, starting in a 3–1 away win against Milan and scored his first goal in the competition against Bologna on 2 October. On 27 November, Mac Allister scored the first goal and was named man of the match in a 2–0 win over Real Madrid, which was Liverpool's first victory against the Spanish club in 15 years. On 26 December, Mac Allister provided two assists for Cody Gakpo and Curtis Jones as his side came from behind to beat Leicester City 3–1 in the Premier League. On 27 April 2025, Mac Allister scored Liverpool's second goal in a 5–1 win over Tottenham Hotspur that secured the club's second Premier League title and 20th overall English league title. He was later voted the Premier League Player of the Month and Liverpool's Player of the Month for April. Mac Allister was named in the PFA Team of the Year and was also one of six nominees for the PFA Players' Player of the Year. Mac Allister was also nominated in the 30-men shortlist for the 2025 Ballon d'Or finishing 22nd.

On Mac Allister's position in the team, Slot added "My thought process is that [Mac Allister and Gravenberch] are incredible [deep-lying midfielders in a 4–2–3–1 formation]. They're important to me but they're especially important to our attackers."

==== 2025–2026 season ====
On 4 November, Mac Allister scored his first goal of the season in a 1–0 win against Real Madrid in the UEFA Champions League. He also scored the winning goal in Liverpool's 1–0 league victory over Nottingham Forest on 22 February 2026.

== International career ==
=== Youth career, senior debut, and 2020 Summer Olympics ===
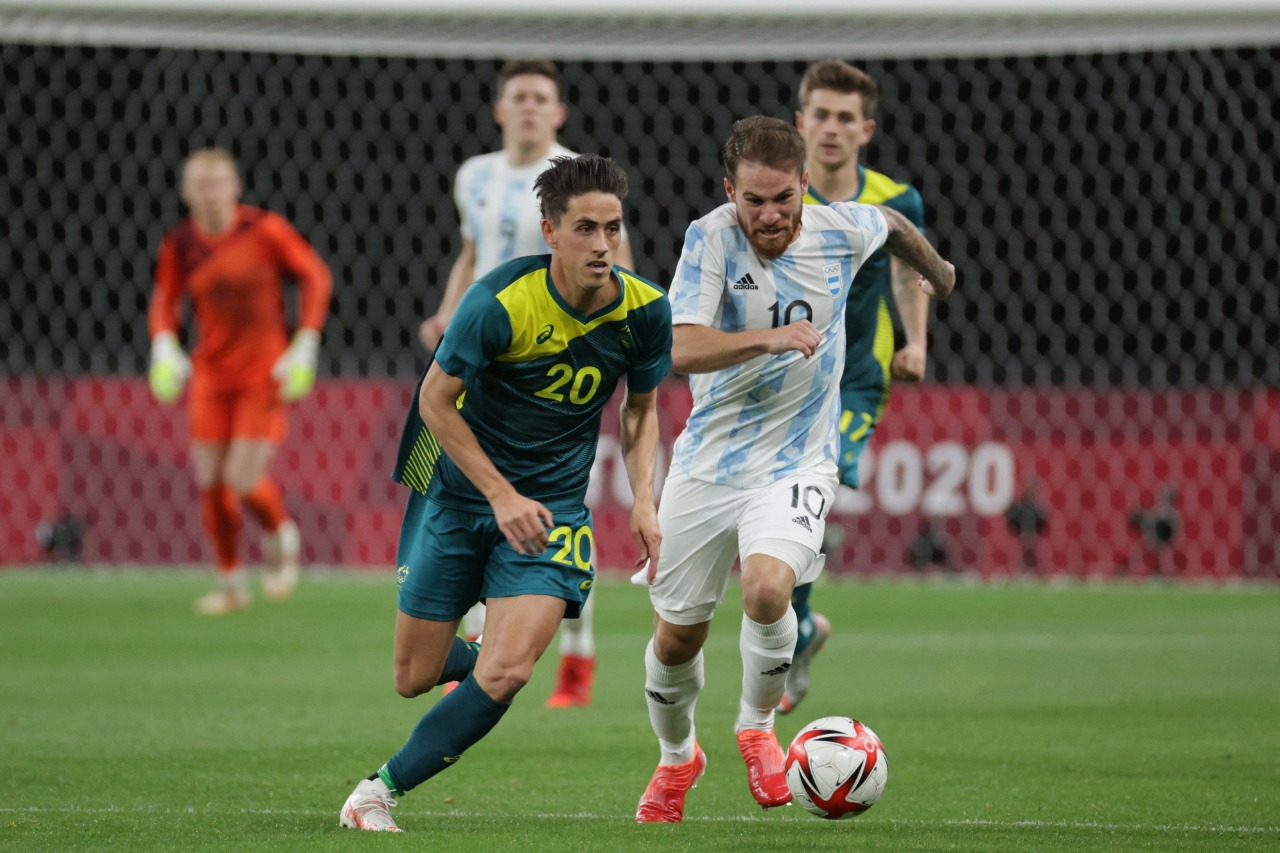
Mac Allister (right) playing for Argentine Olympic team in 2021

Soon after debuting for Argentinos, Mac Allister received a call-up from Claudio Úbeda for the Argentina under-20s. He was selected for the senior team for the first time in August 2019, ahead of friendlies in the United States in September versus Chile and Mexico. His international bow arrived in the match with Chile at the Los Angeles Coliseum on 5 September.

On 1 July 2021, Mac Allister was named in the Argentine Olympic squad for the 2020 Summer Olympics in Tokyo, taking place in 2021 due to the previous year's postponement as a result of the COVID-19 pandemic. He played in Argentina's opening game against Australia starting the match, playing 78 minutes of a 2–0 defeat at the Sapporo Dome on 22 July. He started the next two group games, a 1–0 victory over Egypt on 25 July again being played in the Sapporo Dome and a 1–1 draw with Spain on 28 July at the Saitama Stadium in Midori-ku, Saitama. Argentina were eliminated finishing third in their group on goal difference.

=== Recall into senior squad, World Cup winner and tournament successes ===
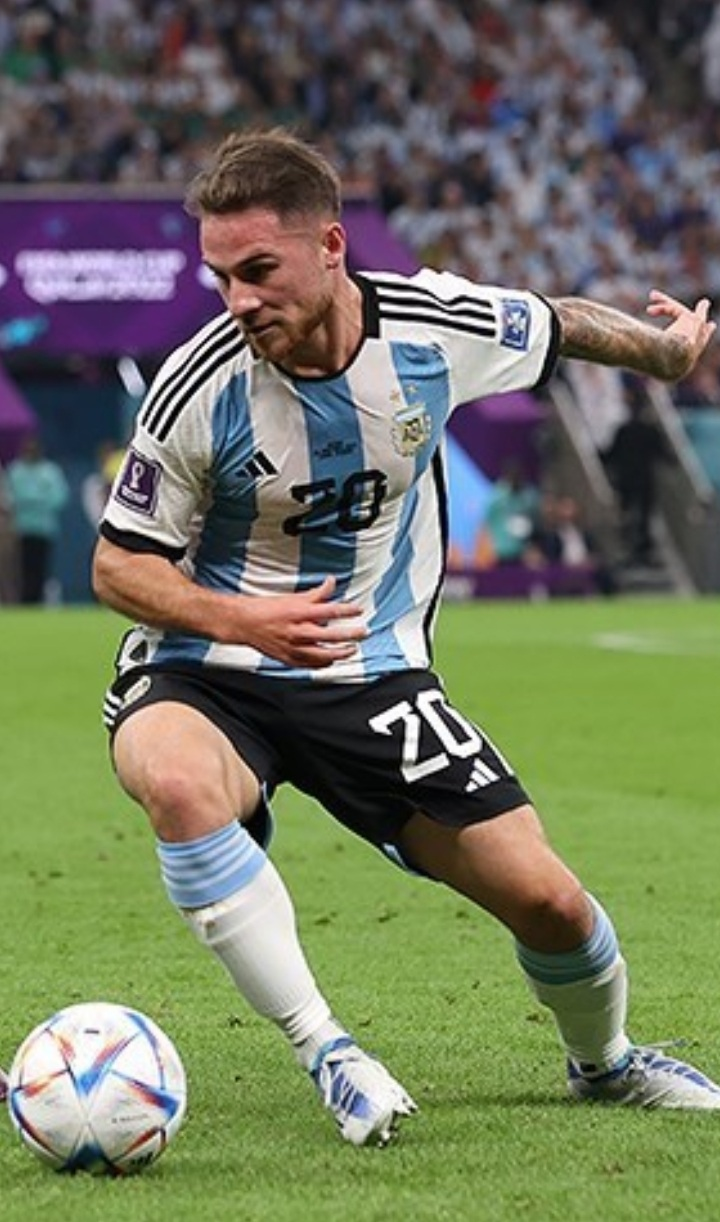
Mac Allister playing for Argentina at the 2022 FIFA World Cup

Mac Allister was recalled to the Argentina national team's senior squad in January 2022 after two and a half years since his first two caps. However, he tested positive for COVID-19 and missed Argentina's 2022 FIFA World Cup qualifier against Chile. He eventually made his first appearance for the national team for almost three years when he started in the 3–0 home win over Venezuela on 25 March. Five days later, in the draw with Ecuador he was forced off injured after being the victim of a knee-high challenge. Due to the subsequent injury, he was returned to Brighton ahead of their next fixture. On 1 June, Mac Allister was an unused substitute as Argentina beat Italy 3–0 in the 2022 Finalissima held at Wembley Stadium.

On 11 November, Mac Allister was named in Argentina's 26-man squad for the 2022 FIFA World Cup. In the last group game against Poland on 30 November, he scored his first international goal to open the score line in an eventual 2–0 win, seeing Argentina through to the round of 16 as group winners. He was named Man of the Match. After Argentina made the final, Mac Allister started the match against defending champions France where he assisted Ángel Di María's goal to make the score 2–0. In the second half of extra time, Mac Allister was substituted before Argentina won the competition following a penalty shoot-out.

In June 2024, Mac Allister was called up to represent Argentina at the 2024 Copa América. He played in all but one of their matches and recorded two assists as they went on to win the tournament, defeating Colombia 1–0 in the final and earning Mac Allister his third senior international trophy in as many years.

On 27 May 2026, Mac Allister was selected in the 26-man squad for the 2026 FIFA World Cup. He scored his first goal in the 2026 FIFA World Cup in the quarter finals against Switzerland with an assist by Lionel Messi in the 10th minute of the match on 11 July 2026.

== Career statistics ==
=== Club ===
As of match played 22 November 2026

Appearances and goals by club, season and competition
Club	Season	League			National cup (Note: Includes Copa Argentina, FA Cup)		League cup (Note: Includes Copa de la Superliga, EFL Cup)		Continental		Other		Total	
Club	Season	Division	Apps	Goals	Apps	Goals	Apps	Goals	Apps	Goals	Apps	Goals	Apps	Goals
Argentinos Juniors	2016–17	Primera B Nacional	24	3	1	0	—		—		—		25	3
Argentinos Juniors	2017–18	Argentine Primera División	25	2	1	1	—		—		—		26	3
Argentinos Juniors	2018–19 (Note: Part of this season was spent on loan from Brighton & Hove Albion)	Argentine Primera División	19	5	2	0	7	1	4 (Note: Appearances in Copa Sudamericana)	0	—		32	6
Argentinos Juniors	Total		68	10	4	1	7	1	4	0	—		83	12
Brighton & Hove Albion	2019–20	Premier League	9	0	—		—		—		—		9	0
Brighton & Hove Albion	2020–21	Premier League	21	1	3	0	3	2	—		—		27	3
Brighton & Hove Albion	2021–22	Premier League	33	5	1	0	2	0	—		—		36	5
Brighton & Hove Albion	2022–23	Premier League	35	10	5	2	0	0	—		—		40	12
Brighton & Hove Albion	Total		98	16	9	2	5	2	—		—		112	20
Boca Juniors (loan)	2019–20	Argentine Primera Division	13	1	1	0	—		6 (Note: Appearances in Copa Libertadores)	1	—		20	2
Liverpool	2023–24	Premier League	33	5	3	1	4	0	6 (Note: Appearances in UEFA Europa League)	1	—		46	7
Liverpool	2024–25	Premier League	35	5	0	0	6	0	8 (Note: Appearances in UEFA Champions League)	2	—		49	7
Liverpool	2025–26	Premier League	37	2	4	0	1	0	12	3	1 (Note: Appearance in FA Community Shield)	0	55	5
Liverpool	2026–27	Premier League	11	1	0	0	2	1	4	3	—		17	5
Liverpool	Total		116	13	7	1	13	1	30	9	1	0	167	24
Career total			295	40	21	4	25	4	40	10	1	0	382	58

=== International ===
As of match played 17 November 2026

Appearances and goals by national team and year
National team	Year	Apps	Goals
Argentina	2019	2	0
Argentina	2020	0	0
Argentina	2021	0	0
Argentina	2022	12	1
Argentina	2023	9	0
Argentina	2024	13	2
Argentina	2025	6	3
Argentina	2026	17	2
Total		59	8

As of match played 17 November 2026
Argentina score listed first, score column indicates score after each Mac Allister goal

List of international goals scored by Alexis Mac Allister
No.	Date	Venue	Cap	Opponent	Score	Result	Competition	Ref.
1	30 November 2022	Stadium 974, Doha, Qatar	10	Poland	1–0	2–0	2022 FIFA World Cup	
2	26 March 2024	Los Angeles Memorial Coliseum, Los Angeles, United States	25	Costa Rica	2–1	3–1	Friendly	
3	5 September 2024	Estadio Monumental, Buenos Aires, Argentina	32	Chile	1–0	3–0	2026 FIFA World Cup qualification	
4	25 March 2025	Estadio Monumental, Buenos Aires, Argentina	38	Brazil	3–1	4–1	2026 FIFA World Cup qualification	
5	14 October 2025	Chase Stadium, Fort Lauderdale, United States	41	Puerto Rico	1–0	6–0	Friendly	
6	14 October 2025	Chase Stadium, Fort Lauderdale, United States	41	Puerto Rico	3–0	6–0	Friendly	
7	11 July 2026	Arrowhead Stadium, Kansas City, United States	52	Switzerland	1–0	3–1 (a.e.t.)	2026 FIFA World Cup	
8	17 November 2026	Estadio Mario Alberto Kempes, Córdoba, Argentina	59	Costa Rica	6–0	7–0	Friendly	

== Honours ==
Argentinos Juniors

- Primera B Nacional: 2016–17

Boca Juniors

- Primera División: 2019–20

Liverpool

- Premier League: 2024–25
- EFL Cup: 2023–24; runner-up: 2024–25

Argentina U23

- CONMEBOL Pre-Olympic Tournament: 2020

Argentina

- FIFA World Cup: 2022; runner-up: 2026
- Copa América: 2024
- CONMEBOL–UEFA Cup of Champions: 2022

Individual

- Liverpool Goal of the Season: 2023–24, 2024–25
- Premier League Goal of the Month: December 2023
- IFFHS Men's CONMEBOL Team: 2023
- Premier League Player of the Month: April 2025
- BBC Goal of the Month: December 2023, April 2024, April 2025
- IFFHS Top 11 Copa América: 2024
- The Athletic Premier League Team of the Season: 2024–25
- PFA Team of the Year: 2024–25 Premier League
