= Carlos Mac Allister =

Argentine footballer (born 1968)

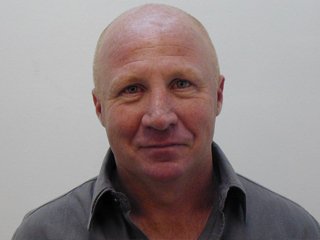
- Mac Allister in 2013

Secretary of Sports
- In office 10 December 2015 – 12 October 2018
- President: Mauricio Macri
- Preceded by: Carlos Espínola
- Succeeded by: Diógenes de Urquiza

National Deputy
- In office 10 December 2013 – 10 December 2015
- Succeeded by: Martín Maquieyra
- Constituency: La Pampa

Personal details
- Born: Carlos Javier Mac Allister; 6 March 1968 (age 58) Santa Rosa, La Pampa, Argentina
- Party: Republican Proposal
- Other political affiliations: Juntos por el Cambio (2015–present)
- Children: Francis Mac Allister; Kevin Mac Allister; Alexis Mac Allister
- Relatives: Patricio Mac Allister (brother)
Association football career
- Height: 1.75 m (5 ft 9 in)
- Position: Left-back
Senior career*
Years	Team	Apps	(Gls)
1986–1992	Argentinos Juniors	120	(5)
1992–1996	Boca Juniors	124	(5)
1996–1998	Racing Club	23	(0)
1998–1999	Ferro Carril Oeste	35	(1)
Total		302	(11)
International career
1993	Argentina	3	(0)
- * Club domestic league appearances and goals

Carlos Javier Mac Allister (born 6 March 1968) is an Argentine politician and former footballer. A left-back, he played for Argentinos Juniors, Boca Juniors, and Racing Club during his career. He also won three international caps for the Argentina national team in 1993. After his football career, Mac Allister was elected as a National Deputy for the Republican Proposal party in 2013, representing his native province of La Pampa. From 2016 to 2019, he served as Secretary of Sports in the government of President Mauricio Macri.

== Club career ==
Mac Allister debuted for Argentinos Juniors in 1986. He transferred to Boca Juniors in 1992, where he scored the winning goal in the gold cup final. In 1996, he left Boca for Racing Club where he played until 1998, playing one final season with Ferro Carril Oeste before retiring at the age of 30.

== International career ==
In 1993, Mac Allister played for the Argentina national team in the qualifiers for the 1994 FIFA World Cup alongside Diego Maradona, Fernando Redondo, Sergio Goycochea, Oscar Ruggeri and Diego Simeone. He was brought into the team in late 1993 following a loss to Colombia on 5 September 1993 in Buenos Aires, and played in the following international games for Argentina:

- 31 October 1993: 1–1 draw vs Australia, played in Sydney in the 1994 World Cup inter-continental qualification playoff;
- 17 November 1993: 1–0 victory vs Australia, played in Buenos Aires in the 1994 World Cup inter-continental qualification playoff;
- 15 December 1993: 2–1 victory vs Germany, played in Miami in a friendly.

However, Mac Allister was not selected for the 1994 FIFA World Cup finals.

== Post-playing career ==
In 1998 the Mac Allister brothers, Carlos and Patricio, established their own sports club for youngsters, the MacAllister Sports Club. They acquired a four-hectare piece of land situated 5 km outside Santa Rosa, in La Pampa province, where they built their own club to train and promote young football players for their subsequent careers in professional football.

He was elected to the National Chamber of Deputies as part of the Republican Proposal party in 2013, representing his native province of La Pampa. From 2015 to 2018, he served as Secretary of Sports in the government of President Mauricio Macri.

== Personal life ==
Mac Allister is of Irish and Italian descent. Mac Allister has ancestors from the Irish town of Donabate. He talked in 2004 about having no deep relations to his roots, but "would love to know Ireland", a place where he "would someday go". His brother is Patricio Mac Allister. He has three sons who are professional footballers: Francis, Kevin and Alexis, the latter of whom is a 2022 FIFA World Cup winner.

== Honours ==
Season	Team	Title
Apertura 1992	Boca Juniors	Primera División Argentina
1993	Boca Juniors	Copa de Oro Nicolás Leoz
