= Kevin Mac Allister =

Argentine footballer

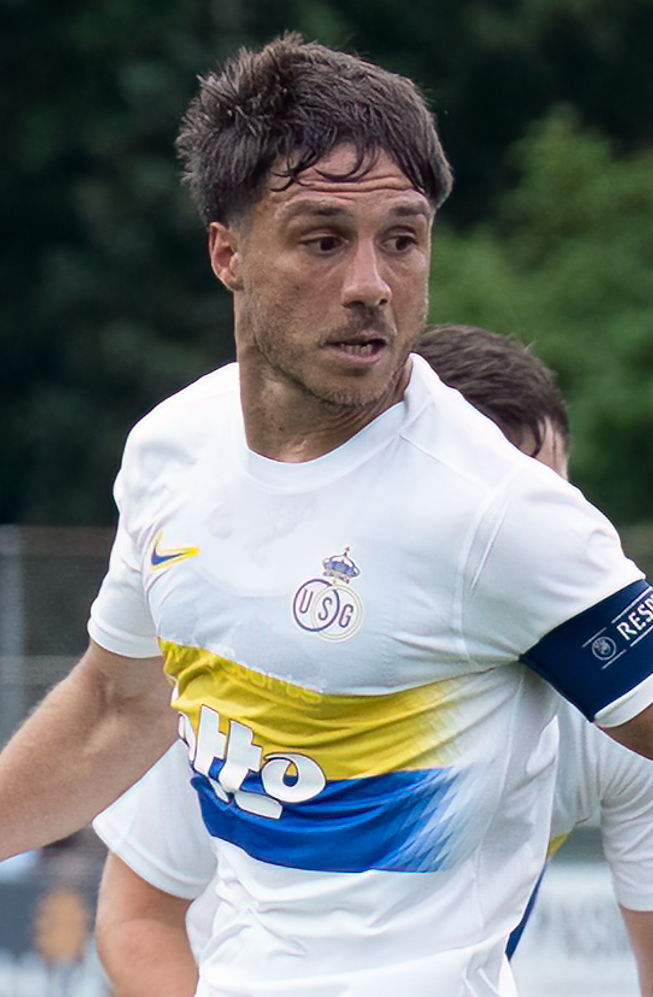
- Mac Allister with Union SG in 2024

Personal information
- Date of birth: 7 November 1997 (age 29)
- Place of birth: Buenos Aires, Argentina
- Height: 1.72 m (5 ft 8 in)
- Position: Defender

Team information
- Current team: Union SG
- Number: 5

Youth career
- Argentinos Juniors

Senior career*
Years	Team	Apps	(Gls)
2016–2023	Argentinos Juniors	136	(12)
2019	→ Boca Juniors (loan)	2	(0)
2023–	Union SG	105	(5)

International career^{‡}
2025–	Argentina	1	(0)
- * Club domestic league appearances and goals as of 22:43, 12 September 2026 (UTC) ‡ National team caps and goals as of 18:31, 14 November 2025 (UTC)

Kevin Mac Allister (born 7 November 1997) is an Argentine professional footballer who plays as a centre-back or full-back for Belgian Pro League club Union SG and the Argentina national team.

== Club career ==
=== Early career ===
The Mac Allister brothers started their career with Argentinos Juniors. He made his first team debut for Argentinos on 27 February 2016 in a 4–1 defeat against Estudiantes. Mac Allister made more appearances followed in his debut season of 2016. The team was relegated in that season and he subsequently made sixteen appearances in Primera B Nacional as Argentinos won the title. Mac Allister scored his first senior goal in March 2018 against Gimnasia y Esgrima. Mac Allister joined Boca Juniors on loan in January 2019.

=== Union SG ===
On 12 July 2023, Belgian club Union SG announced the signing of Mac Allister on a three-year contract, with an option of a further year. Later that year, on 5 October, he shared the pitch with his young brother Alexis after the latter came on as a substitute in a Europa League group stage match against Liverpool.

On 25 May 2025, Mac Allister was a member of the Union SG squad that achieved the 2024–25 Belgian Pro League, ending a 90-year title drought. Two months later, on 5 July, he extended his contract with the club until 2027.

== International career ==
Mac Allister received a call-up to the Argentina U20 squad for the 2017 South American Youth Football Championship in Ecuador. However, he missed the tournament due to injury.

In November 2025, Mac Allister received his first call-up to the senior Argentina national team for a friendly match against Angola. He debuted in said tournament against the same opponent on 14 November.

== Personal life ==
Mac Allister is of predominantly Irish descent, with some Scottish ancestry as well. His Irish ancestry can be traced back to Donabate, County Dublin, while his Scottish ancestry can be traced back to Tarbert, Kintyre. Mac Allister's Scottish forefather Charles McAllister, a Protestant who converted to Catholicism, had temporarily moved to Donabate from the Scottish town of Tarbert in the 18th century. Charles' descendant Joseph McAllister emigrated from Donabate in 1865 to acquire farmland in Argentina, where the family name was changed to Mac Allister. Additionally, Mac Allister has Italian ancestry through his maternal grandmother, whose roots trace back to Belmonte del Sannio, Isernia.

Mac Allister has two brothers, Alexis who plays as a midfielder for club Liverpool and the Argentina national team with whom he won the 2022 FIFA World Cup and Francis who plays as a midfielder for Deportes La Serena of the Liga de Primera. They are the sons of Carlos Mac Allister and nephews of Patricio Mac Allister. His cousin, Luciano Guaycochea is also a professional footballer.

As of 2024, Mac Allister was engaged to marry Tatiana Batista, daughter of former footballer and coach Fernando Batista. The couple married on 14 June 2025, and announced in the same month they were expecting their first child together.

Mac Allister is named after the main protagonist of the American Christmas family comedy film Home Alone, a fact that he did not find out until he was eighteen years old.

== Career statistics ==
=== Club ===
As of match played 12 September 2026

Appearances and goals by club, season and competition
Club	Season	League			National cup (Note: Includes Copa Argentina, Belgian Cup)		League cup (Note: Includes Copa de la Liga Profesional)		Continental		Other		Total	
Club	Season	Division	Apps	Goals	Apps	Goals	Apps	Goals	Apps	Goals	Apps	Goals	Apps	Goals
Argentinos Juniors	2016	Argentine Primera División	4	0	0	0	—		—		—		4	0
Argentinos Juniors	2016–17	Primera B Nacional	16	0	0	0	—		—		—		16	0
Argentinos Juniors	2017–18	Argentine Primera División	12	1	1	0	—		—		—		13	1
Argentinos Juniors	2018–19	Argentine Primera División	9	0	1	0	—		—		—		10	0
Argentinos Juniors	2019–20	Argentine Primera División	2	0	0	0	0	0	—		—		3	0
Argentinos Juniors	2020	Argentine Primera División	8	0	5	1	1	1	1 (Note: Appearance in Copa Sudamericana)	0	—		14	2
Argentinos Juniors	2021	Argentine Primera División	32	2	0	0	0	0	6 (Note: Appearances in Copa Libertadores)	0	—		38	2
Argentinos Juniors	2022	Argentine Primera División	33	5	1	0	0	0	—		—		34	5
Argentinos Juniors	2023	Argentine Primera División	20	4	1	0	0	0	6	0	—		27	4
Argentinos Juniors	Total		136	12	9	1	1	1	13	0	—		159	14
Boca Juniors (loan)	2018–19	Argentine Primera División	2	0	—		—		—		—		2	0
Union SG	2023–24	Belgian Pro League	30	1	6	0	—		10 (Note: Eight appearances in UEFA Europa League, two appearances in UEFA Europa Conference League)	0	—		46	1
Union SG	2024–25	Belgian Pro League	35	2	1	0	—		10 (Note: Two appearances in UEFA Champions League, eight appearances and two goals in UEFA Europa League)	3	1 (Note: Appearance in Belgian Super Cup)	0	47	5
Union SG	2025–26	Belgian Pro League	34	1	5	1	—		8 (Note: Appearances in UEFA Champions League)	1	1	0	48	3
Union SG	2026–27	Belgian Pro League	6	1	0	0	—		2 (Note: Two appearances in UEFA Champions League)	0	1	1	9	2
Union SG	Total		105	5	12	1	—		30	4	3	1	150	11
Career total			244	17	20	2	1	1	43	4	3	1	311	25

=== International ===
As of match played 14 November 2025

Appearances and goals by national team and year
National team	Year	Apps	Goals
Argentina	2025	1	0
Total		1	0

== Honours ==
Argentinos Juniors

- Primera B Nacional: 2016–17

Union SG

- Belgian Pro League: 2024–25
- Belgian Cup: 2023–24, 2025–26
- Belgian Super Cup: 2024, 2026

Individual

- Argentine Primera División Team of the Season: 2023
