= McAlester =

McAlester may refer to:

- McAlester, Oklahoma, an American city in Pittsburg County, Oklahoma

== People with the surname ==
- Charles Godfrey McAlester (1765–1847)
- J. J. McAlester (1842–1920), American Confederate Army soldier and merchant
- Miles D. McAlester (1833–1869), Union general in the American Civil War
- Virginia Savage McAlester (1943-2020), architectural historian

== See also ==
- McAlester Army Ammunition Plant in McAlester, Oklahoma
- Macalester (disambiguation)
- McCalister, surname
