= Successor parish =

Type of English civil parish

- Category: Civil parish
- Location: England
- Found in: Districts
- Created by: Local Government Act 1972
- Created: 1 April 1974
- Number: 300 (as of 1 April 1974)
- Possible types: City; Town; Parish
- Government: City council; Town council; Parish council

Successor parishes are civil parishes with a parish council, created in England in 1974. They replaced, with the same boundaries, a selected group of urban districts and municipal boroughs: a total of 300 successor parishes were formed from the former areas of 78 municipal boroughs and 221 urban districts.

== Background ==
Until 1974, almost all of England was covered by civil parishes. The Local Government Act 1894 (56 & 57 Vict. c. 73) had created parish councils, but only for those parishes which fell within rural districts. In urban areas the urban district council or borough council was the lowest level of government, even if the district or borough covered several urban parishes. During the twentieth century the number of parishes in urban areas gradually reduced, as many towns consolidated all their urban parishes into a single parish which coincided with the urban district or borough.

== Creation ==
Schedule 7 of the Local Government Act 1972 created the Local Government Boundary Commission for England, and part V of schedule 1 directed it to consult with the existing local authorities and make proposals for the establishment of new parishes. These would have a boundary coterminous with an existing urban district or borough, or if divided by a district boundary, as much as was comprised in a single district. The commission was also to propose names for the parishes.

The concept of successor parishes was a relatively late addition to the Local Government Bill, being added at report stage in response to pressure from the councils of small urban districts and boroughs. It was further allowed that these parish councils would be entitled to be styled 'towns' and have 'town mayors', and retain other charter rights. The mechanism for towns and town mayors was introduced in a government amendment in the Lords in September 1972.

The Secretary of State for the Environment was permitted to give the commission guidance on making their proposals. The stated policy was "to retain elected councils at parish level for small towns but not for areas which are parts of larger towns or continuously built up areas". The original criteria for identifying "small towns" was that they should have fewer than 20,000 inhabitants, or less than 20 percent of the district's population.

Local Government (Successor Parishes) Order 1973
- Statutory Instrument
- Parliament of the United Kingdom
- Citation: SI 1973/1110

Dates
- Made: 22 June 1973
- Laid before Parliament: 29 June 1973
- Commencement: 6 July 1973
Other legislation
Made under	Local Government Act 1972

Text of statute as originally enacted

Local Government (Successor Parishes) (No. 2) Order 1973
- Statutory Instrument
- Parliament of the United Kingdom
- Citation: SI 1973/1939

Dates
- Made: 16 November 1973
- Laid before Parliament: 26 November 1973
- Commencement: 17 December 1973
Other legislation
Made under	Local Government Act 1972

Text of statute as originally enacted

Local Government (Successor Parishes) Order 1974
- Statutory Instrument
- Parliament of the United Kingdom
- Citation: SI 1974/569

Dates
- Made: 27 March 1974
- Laid before Parliament: 28 March 1974
- Commencement: 30 March 1974
Other legislation
Made under	Local Government Act 1972

Text of statute as originally enacted

A report was issued by the commission in May 1973. Following the publication of the report, a large number of representations were made. Fifty-two towns in metropolitan districts wished to be granted successor status, of which ten were successful. A similar number of towns in non-metropolitan districts also made representations, of which fifteen were favourably received. The parishes were created by three statutory instruments: the Local Government (Successor Parishes) Order 1973 (SI 1973/1110), the Local Government (Successor Parishes) (No. 2) Order 1973 (SI 1973/1939), and the Local Government (Successor Parishes) Order 1974 (SI 1974/569).

Where the area of a borough became a successor parish, the powers of the borough corporation under its charter to appoint local officers of dignity passed to the new parish council. Successor parish councils could also apply for the transfer of the coat of arms of the former council by Order in Council. The majority of successor parish councils chose to exercise their right to designate their parish a town, with the parish council becoming a town council. A handful (Chichester, Ely, Ripon, Truro, and Wells) were successors to cities, with the parish council known as a city council.

Civil parishes are not permitted to cross district or county boundaries, and where the creation of a successor parish would cause this to happen, either only part of the former area became a parish or two parishes were formed.

== List of successor parishes ==
Abolished district	Successor parish	Successor parish county
Clevedon Urban District	Clevedon	Avon
Norton-Radstock Urban District	Norton-Radstock^{13}	Avon
Portishead Urban District	Portishead^{14}	Avon
Ampthill Urban District	Ampthill	Bedfordshire
Biggleswade Urban District	Biggleswade	Bedfordshire
Kempston Urban District	Kempston Urban^{1}	Bedfordshire
Leighton-Linslade Urban District	Leighton-Linslade	Bedfordshire
Sandy Urban District	Sandy	Bedfordshire
Wokingham Municipal Borough	Wokingham	Berkshire
Eton Urban District	Eton	Berkshire
Beaconsfield Urban District	Beaconsfield	Buckinghamshire
Buckingham Municipal Borough	Buckingham	Buckinghamshire
Chesham Urban District	Chesham	Buckinghamshire
Marlow Urban District	Marlow	Buckinghamshire
Chatteris Urban District	Chatteris	Cambridgeshire
Ely Urban District	Ely	Cambridgeshire
Huntingdon and Godmanchester Municipal Borough	Huntingdon and Godmanchester^{2}	Cambridgeshire
St Ives Municipal Borough	Saint Ives^{15}	Cambridgeshire
March Urban District	March	Cambridgeshire
Ramsey Urban District	Ramsey	Cambridgeshire
St Neots Urban District	St Neots	Cambridgeshire
Wisbech Municipal Borough	Wisbech	Cambridgeshire
Alderley Edge Urban District	Alderley Edge	Cheshire
Alsager Urban District	Alsager	Cheshire
Bollington Urban District	Bollington	Cheshire
Golborne Urban District (part)	Culcheth and Glazebury	Cheshire
Knutsford Urban District	Knutsford	Cheshire
Lymm Urban District	Lymm	Cheshire
Middlewich Urban District	Middlewich	Cheshire
Nantwich Urban District	Nantwich	Cheshire
Northwich Urban District	Northwich	Cheshire
Sandbach Urban District	Sandbach	Cheshire
Winsford Urban District	Winsford	Cheshire
Guisborough Urban District	Guisborough	Cleveland
Loftus Urban District	Loftus	Cleveland
Saltburn and Marske-by-the-Sea Urban District	Saltburn and Marske-by-the-Sea^{3}	Cleveland
Bodmin Municipal Borough	Bodmin	Cornwall
Bude-Stratton Urban District	Bude–Stratton	Cornwall
Falmouth Municipal Borough	Falmouth	Cornwall
Helston Municipal Borough	Helston	Cornwall
Dunheved, otherwise Launceston Municipal Borough	Launceston	Cornwall
Liskeard Municipal Borough	Liskeard	Cornwall
Looe Urban District	Looe	Cornwall
Penryn Municipal Borough	Penryn	Cornwall
St Ives Municipal Borough	St Ives	Cornwall
St Just Urban District	St Just	Cornwall
Saltash Municipal Borough	Saltash	Cornwall
Truro Municipal Borough	Truro	Cornwall
Torpoint Urban District	Torpoint	Cornwall
Appleby Municipal Borough	Appleby^{16}	Cumbria
Cockermouth Urban District	Cockermouth	Cumbria
Grange Urban District	Grange-over-Sands	Cumbria
Kendal Municipal Borough	Kendal	Cumbria
Keswick Urban District	Keswick	Cumbria
Lakes Urban District (part)	Lakes	Cumbria
Lakes Urban District (part)	Patterdale	Cumbria
Maryport Urban District	Maryport	Cumbria
Ulverston Urban District	Ulverston	Cumbria
Windermere Urban District	Windermere^{17}	Cumbria
Ashbourne Urban District	Ashbourne	Derbyshire
Bakewell Urban District	Bakewell	Derbyshire
Belper Urban District	Belper	Derbyshire
Bolsover Urban District	Old Bolsover	Derbyshire
Clay Cross Urban District	Clay Cross	Derbyshire
Dronfield Urban District	Dronfield	Derbyshire
New Mills Urban District	New Mills	Derbyshire
Ripley Urban District	Ripley	Derbyshire
Staveley Urban District	Staveley	Derbyshire
Whaley Bridge Urban District	Whaley Bridge	Derbyshire
Wirksworth Urban District	Wirksworth	Derbyshire
Ashburton Urban District	Ashburton	Devon
Barnstaple Municipal Borough	Barnstaple	Devon
Bideford Municipal Borough	Bideford	Devon
Buckfastleigh Urban District	Buckfastleigh	Devon
Budleigh Salterton Urban District	Budleigh Salterton	Devon
Crediton Urban District	Crediton	Devon
Dartmouth Municipal Borough	Dartmouth	Devon
Dawlish Urban District	Dawlish	Devon
Great Torrington Municipal Borough	Great Torrington	Devon
Honiton Municipal Borough	Honiton	Devon
Ilfracombe Urban District	Ilfracombe	Devon
Kingsbridge Urban District	Kingsbridge	Devon
Lynton Urban District	Lynton	Devon
Newton Abbot Urban District	Newton Abbot	Devon
Northam Urban District	Northam	Devon
Okehampton Municipal Borough	Okehampton	Devon
Ottery St Mary Urban District	Ottery St Mary	Devon
Salcombe Urban District	Salcombe	Devon
Seaton Urban District	Seaton	Devon
Sidmouth Urban District	Sidmouth	Devon
Teignmouth Urban District	Teignmouth	Devon
Tiverton Municipal Borough	Tiverton	Devon
Totnes Municipal Borough	Totnes	Devon
Blandford Forum Municipal Borough	Blandford Forum	Dorset
Bridport Municipal Borough	Bridport	Dorset
Dorchester Municipal Borough	Dorchester	Dorset
Lyme Regis Municipal Borough	Lyme Regis	Dorset
Portland Urban District	Portland	Dorset
Shaftesbury Municipal Borough	Shaftesbury	Dorset
Sherborne Urban District	Sherborne	Dorset
Swanage Urban District	Swanage	Dorset
Wareham Municipal Borough	Wareham Lady St Mary^{5}	Dorset
Wimborne Minster Urban District	Wimborne Minster	Dorset
Barnard Castle Urban District	Barnard Castle	Durham
Brandon and Byshottles Urban District	Brandon and Byshottles	Durham
Shildon Urban District	Shildon	Durham
Spennymoor Urban District	Spennymoor	Durham
Tow Law Urban District	Tow Law	Durham
Lewes Municipal Borough	Lewes	East Sussex
Newhaven Urban District	Newhaven	East Sussex
Rye Municipal Borough	Rye	East Sussex
Brightlingsea Urban District	Brightlingsea	Essex
Burnham-on-Crouch Urban District	Burnham-on-Crouch	Essex
Epping Urban District	Epping	Essex
Frinton and Walton Urban District	Frinton and Walton	Essex
Halstead Urban District	Halstead	Essex
Harwich Municipal Borough	Harwich	Essex
Saffron Walden Municipal Borough	Saffron Walden	Essex
Waltham Holy Cross Urban District	Waltham Abbey	Essex
West Mersea Urban District	West Mersea	Essex
Wivenhoe Urban District	Wivenhoe	Essex
Cirencester Urban District	Cirencester	Gloucestershire
Nailsworth Urban District	Nailsworth	Gloucestershire
Tewkesbury Municipal Borough	Tewkesbury	Gloucestershire
Blackrod Urban District	Blackrod	Greater Manchester
Horwich Urban District	Horwich	Greater Manchester
Saddleworth Urban District	Saddleworth	Greater Manchester
Alton Urban District	Alton	Hampshire
Petersfield Urban District	Petersfield	Hampshire
Romsey Municipal Borough	Romsey	Hampshire
Bewdley Municipal Borough	Bewdley	Hereford and Worcester
Droitwich Municipal Borough	Droitwich^{6}	Hereford and Worcester
Evesham Municipal Borough	Evesham	Hereford and Worcester
Kington Urban District	Kington	Hereford and Worcester
Leominster Municipal Borough	Leominster	Hereford and Worcester
Ross-on-Wye Urban District	Ross-on-Wye	Hereford and Worcester
Stourport-on-Severn Urban District	Stourport-on-Severn	Hereford and Worcester
Berkhamsted Urban District	Berkhamsted	Hertfordshire
Bishop's Stortford Urban District	Bishop's Stortford	Hertfordshire
Chorleywood Urban District	Chorleywood	Hertfordshire
Harpenden Urban District	Harpenden	Hertfordshire
Hertford Municipal Borough	Hertford	Hertfordshire
Royston Urban District	Royston	Hertfordshire
Sawbridgeworth Urban District	Sawbridgeworth	Hertfordshire
Tring Urban District	Tring	Hertfordshire
Ware Urban District	Ware	Hertfordshire
Barton-upon-Humber Urban District	Barton-upon-Humber	Humberside
Brigg Urban District	Brigg	Humberside
Hedon Municipal Borough	Hedon	Humberside
Hornsea Urban District	Hornsea	Humberside
Ventnor Urban District	Ventnor	Isle of Wight
Broadstairs and St Peter's Urban District	Broadstairs and St Peter's	Kent
Faversham Municipal Borough	Faversham	Kent
Hythe Municipal Borough	Hythe	Kent
Lydd Municipal Borough	Lydd	Kent
New Romney Municipal Borough	New Romney	Kent
Sandwich Municipal Borough	Sandwich	Kent
Sevenoaks Urban District	Sevenoaks	Kent
Southborough Urban District	Southborough	Kent
Swanscombe Urban District	Swanscombe^{7}	Kent
Tenterden Municipal Borough	Tenterden	Kent
Adlington Urban District	Adlington	Lancashire
Carnforth Urban District	Carnforth	Lancashire
Clitheroe Municipal Borough	Clitheroe	Lancashire
Kirkham Urban District	Kirkham	Lancashire
Longridge Urban District	Longridge	Lancashire
Preesall Urban District	Preesall	Lancashire
Turton Urban District (part)	Turton North^{11}	Lancashire
Whitworth Urban District	Whitworth	Lancashire
Withnell Urban District	Withnell	Lancashire
Ashby de la Zouch Urban District	Ashby de la Zouch	Leicestershire
Ashby Woulds Urban District	Ashby Woulds	Leicestershire
Oakham Urban District	Oakham	Leicestershire
Alford Urban District	Alford	Lincolnshire
Bourne Urban District	Bourne	Lincolnshire
Horncastle Urban District	Horncastle	Lincolnshire
Louth Municipal Borough	Louth	Lincolnshire
Mablethorpe and Sutton Urban District	Mablethorpe and Sutton	Lincolnshire
Market Rasen Urban District	Market Rasen	Lincolnshire
Skegness Urban District	Skegness	Lincolnshire
Sleaford Urban District	Sleaford	Lincolnshire
Stamford Municipal Borough	Stamford	Lincolnshire
Woodhall Spa Urban District	Woodhall Spa	Lincolnshire
Ashton-in-Makerfield Urban District (part)	Seneley Green	Merseyside
Billinge and Winstanley Urban District (part)	Billinge Chapel End	Merseyside
Rainford Urban District	Rainford	Merseyside
Cromer Urban District	Cromer	Norfolk
Diss Urban District	Diss	Norfolk
Downham Market Urban District	Downham Market	Norfolk
East Dereham Urban District	East Dereham^{8}	Norfolk
Hunstanton Urban District	Hunstanton	Norfolk
North Walsham Urban District	North Walsham	Norfolk
Sheringham Urban District	Sheringham	Norfolk
Swaffham Urban District	Swaffham	Norfolk
Thetford Municipal Borough	Thetford	Norfolk
Wells-next-the-Sea Urban District	Wells-next-the-Sea	Norfolk
Wymondham Urban District	Wymondham	Norfolk
Filey Urban District	Filey	North Yorkshire
Knaresborough Urban District	Knaresborough	North Yorkshire
Malton Urban District	Malton	North Yorkshire
Northallerton Urban District	Northallerton	North Yorkshire
Norton Urban District	Norton	North Yorkshire
Pickering Urban District	Pickering	North Yorkshire
Richmond Municipal Borough	Richmond	North Yorkshire
Ripon Municipal Borough	Ripon	North Yorkshire
Scalby Urban District	Scalby	North Yorkshire
Selby Urban District	Selby	North Yorkshire
Skipton Urban District	Skipton	North Yorkshire
Whitby Urban District	Whitby	North Yorkshire
Brackley Municipal Borough	Brackley	Northamptonshire
Burton Latimer Urban District	Burton Latimer	Northamptonshire
Desborough Urban District	Desborough	Northamptonshire
Higham Ferrers Municipal Borough	Higham Ferrers	Northamptonshire
Irthlingborough Urban District	Irthlingborough	Northamptonshire
Oundle Urban District	Oundle	Northamptonshire
Raunds Urban District	Raunds	Northamptonshire
Rothwell Urban District	Rothwell	Northamptonshire
Alnwick Urban District	Alnwick	Northumberland
Amble Urban District	Amble	Northumberland
Hexham Urban District	Hexham	Northumberland
Prudhoe Urban District	Prudhoe	Northumberland
Eastwood Urban District	Eastwood	Nottinghamshire
Warsop Urban District	Warsop	Nottinghamshire
Abingdon Municipal Borough	Abingdon	Oxfordshire
Bicester Urban District	Bicester	Oxfordshire
Chipping Norton Municipal Borough	Chipping Norton	Oxfordshire
Henley on Thames Municipal Borough	Henley-on-Thames	Oxfordshire
Thame Urban District	Thame	Oxfordshire
Wallingford Municipal Borough	Wallingford	Oxfordshire
Wantage Urban District	Wantage	Oxfordshire
Witney Urban District	Witney	Oxfordshire
Woodstock Municipal Borough	Woodstock	Oxfordshire
Newport Urban District	Newport	Salop (Shropshire)
Burnham-on-Sea Urban District	Burnham-on-Sea and Highbridge	Somerset
Chard Municipal Borough	Chard^{12}	Somerset
Crewkerne Urban District	Crewkerne	Somerset
Frome Urban District	Frome	Somerset
Glastonbury Municipal Borough	Glastonbury	Somerset
Ilminster Urban District	Ilminster	Somerset
Shepton Mallet Urban District	Shepton Mallet	Somerset
Street Urban District	Street	Somerset
Watchet Urban District	Watchet	Somerset
Wellington Urban District	Wellington	Somerset
Wells Municipal Borough	Wells	Somerset
Penistone Urban District	Penistone	South Yorkshire
Stocksbridge Urban District	Stocksbridge	South Yorkshire
Tickhill Urban District	Tickhill	South Yorkshire
Biddulph Urban District	Biddulph	Staffordshire
Kidsgrove Urban District	Kidsgrove	Staffordshire
Leek Urban District	Leek	Staffordshire
Stone Urban District	Stone	Staffordshire
Uttoxeter Urban District	Uttoxeter	Staffordshire
Aldeburgh Municipal Borough	Aldeburgh	Suffolk
Beccles Municipal Borough	Beccles	Suffolk
Bungay Urban District	Bungay	Suffolk
Eye Municipal Borough	Eye	Suffolk
Felixstowe Urban District	Felixstowe	Suffolk
Hadleigh Urban District	Hadleigh	Suffolk
Halesworth Urban District	Halesworth	Suffolk
Leiston-cum-Sizewell Urban District	Leiston	Suffolk
Saxmundham Urban District	Saxmundham	Suffolk
Southwold Urban District	Southwold	Suffolk
Stowmarket Urban District	Stowmarket	Suffolk
Sudbury Municipal Borough	Sudbury	Suffolk
Woodbridge Urban District	Woodbridge	Suffolk
Godalming Municipal Borough	Godalming	Surrey
Haslemere Urban District	Haslemere	Surrey
Hetton Urban District	Hetton	Tyne and Wear
Stratford upon Avon Municipal Borough	Stratford-upon-Avon	Warwickshire
Kenilworth Urban District	Kenilworth	Warwickshire
Warwick Municipal Borough	Warwick	Warwickshire
Arundel Municipal Borough	Arundel	West Sussex
Burgess Hill Urban District	Burgess Hill	West Sussex
Chichester Municipal Borough	Chichester	West Sussex
East Grinstead Urban District	East Grinstead	West Sussex
Littlehampton Urban District	Littlehampton	West Sussex
Denby Dale Urban District	Denby Dale	West Yorkshire
Denholme Urban District	Denholme	West Yorkshire
Featherstone Urban District	Featherstone	West Yorkshire
Hebden Royd Urban District	Hebden Royd	West Yorkshire
Hemsworth Urban District	Hemsworth	West Yorkshire
Holmfirth Urban District	Holmfirth^{10}	West Yorkshire
Ilkley Urban District	Ilkley	West Yorkshire
Kirkburton Urban District	Kirkburton	West Yorkshire
Meltham Urban District	Meltham	West Yorkshire
Normanton Urban District	Normanton	West Yorkshire
Otley Urban District	Otley	West Yorkshire
Ripponden Urban District	Ripponden	West Yorkshire
Silsden Urban District	Silsden	West Yorkshire
Todmorden Municipal Borough	Todmorden	West Yorkshire
Bradford-on-Avon Urban District	Bradford-on-Avon	Wiltshire
Calne Municipal Borough	Calne	Wiltshire
Devizes Municipal Borough	Devizes	Wiltshire
Malmesbury Municipal Borough	Malmesbury	Wiltshire
Marlborough Municipal Borough	Marlborough	Wiltshire
Melksham Urban District	Melksham	Wiltshire
Trowbridge Urban District	Trowbridge	Wiltshire
Warminster Urban District	Warminster	Wiltshire
Westbury Urban District	Westbury	Wiltshire
Wilton Municipal Borough	Wilton	Wiltshire

== Notes ==
- 1 Subsequently merged with North Weston to form Portishead and North Weston in 1993; subsequently renamed Portishead 1 June 1993
- 2 Subsequently split into separate Huntingdon and Godmanchester parishes in 1982
- 3 Subsequently renamed Saltburn, Marske and New Marske 1 April 1983
- 5 Subsequently renamed Wareham Town 18 October 1984
- 6 Subsequently renamed Droitwich Spa 25 February 1993
- 7 Subsequently renamed Swanscombe and Greenhithe 28 May 1981
- 8 Subsequently renamed Dereham 24 June 1991
- 10 Subsequently renamed Holme Valley 1 April 1976
- 11 Subsequently renamed North Turton 6 May 1975
- 12 Subsequently renamed Chard Town
- 13 Subsequently split into separate Midsomer Norton, Radstock and Westfield parishes
- 14 Subsequently renamed Kempston 25 March 1975
- 15 Subsequently renamed St Ives 8 April 2010
- 16 Subsequently renamed Appleby-in-Westmorland 1 April 1976
- 17 Subsequently renamed Windermere and Bowness 29 July 2020
