= List of urban districts formed in England and Wales 1896–1974 =

The following is a list of towns in England and Wales which formed urban districts under the Local Government Act 1894 in the years following its introduction. For districts formed when the act came into force see: Urban districts formed in England and Wales 1894–95.
Note for table: 'UD' stands for Urban District, 'RD' stands for Rural District, 'MB' stands for Municipal Borough and 'CB' stands for County Borough.

== 1896-99 ==
In the period 1896-99 sixty urban districts were formed and twenty-two abolished, a net increase of 38, bringing the total number of urban districts to 813.

Urban District	County	Created	Abolished	Successor(s)
Kempston UD	Bedfordshire	1896	1974	Bedford
Great Marlow UD (1896–97), Marlow UD (1897-1974)	Buckinghamshire	1896	1974	Wycombe
Heavitree UD	Devon	1896	1913	absorbed by Exeter CB
Annfield Plain UD	County Durham	1896	1937	absorbed by Consett UD and Stanley UD
Brightlingsea UD	Essex	1896	1974	Tendring
Epping UD	Essex	1896	1974	Epping Forest
Connah's Quay UD	Flintshire	1896	1974	Alyn and Deeside
Prestatyn UD	Flintshire	1896	1974	Rhuddlan
Farnborough UD	Hampshire	1896	1974	Rushmoor
Alford UD	Lincolnshire, Parts of Lindsey	1896	1974	East Lindsey
Mablethorpe UD (1894-1925), Mablethorpe and Sutton UD (1925–74)	Lincolnshire, Parts of Lindsey	1896	1974	East Lindsey
Far Cotton UD	Northamptonshire	1896	1900	absorbed by Northampton CB
St James UD	Northamptonshire	1896	1900	absorbed by Northampton CB
Ashington UD	Northumberland	1896	1974	Wansbeck
Rothbury UD	Northumberland	1896	1935	absorbed by Rothbury RD
Eastwood UD	Nottinghamshire	1896	1974	Broxtowe
Kirkby in Ashfield UD	Nottinghamshire	1896	1974	Ashfield
Highbridge UD	Somerset	1896	1933	absorbed by Burnham-on-Sea UD
Uttoxeter UD	Staffordshire	1896	1974	East Staffordshire
Glemsford UD	West Suffolk	1896	1935	absorbed by Melford RD
Darfield UD	West Riding of Yorkshire	1896	1974	Barnsley
Royston UD	West Riding of Yorkshire	1896	1974	Barnsley
Linslade UD	Buckinghamshire	1897	1965	Leighton-Linslade UD, Bedfordshire
Newport Pagnell UD	Buckinghamshire	1897	1974	Milton Keynes
Newcastle Emlyn UD	Carmarthenshire	1897	1974	Carmarthen
St Just UD	Cornwall	1897	1974	Penwith
Llanrwst UD	Denbighshire	1897	1974	Aberconwy
Leigh on Sea UD	Essex	1897	1913	absorbed by Southend on Sea MB
Buckley UD	Flintshire	1897	1974	Alyn and Deeside
Royston UD	Hertfordshire	1897	1974	North Hertfordshire
Raunds UD	Northamptonshire	1897	1974	East Northamptonshire
Earsdon UD	Northumberland	1897	1935	Seaton Valley UD, Tynemouth CB and Whitley Bay UD
Lye and Wollescote UD	Worcestershire	1897	1933	absorbed by Stourbridge MB
Betws-y-Coed UD	Caernarfonshire	1898	1974	Aberconwy
Looe UD	Cornwall	1898	1974	Caradon
Wadebridge UD	Cornwall	1898	1934	Wadebridge RD
Ashburton UD	Devon	1898	1974	Teignbridge
Tavistock UD	Devon	1898	1966	absorbed by Tavistock RD
Crook UD	County Durham	1898	1937	Crook and Willington UD
Portslade-by-Sea UD	East Sussex	1898	1974	Hove
Burnham-on-Crouch UD	Essex	1898	1974	Maldon
Wivenhoe UD	Essex	1898	1974	Colchester
Itchen UD	Hampshire	1898	1920	absorbed by Southampton CB
Berkhamsted UD, Great Berkhampstead (1898–1937)	Hertfordshire	1898	1974	Dacorum
Harpenden UD	Hertfordshire	1898	1974	St Albans
Rickmansworth UD	Hertfordshire	1898	1974	Three Rivers
Cheriton UD	Kent	1898	1934	absorbed by Folkestone MB and Hythe MB
Bracebridge UD	Lincolnshire, Parts of Kesteven	1898	1920	absorbed by Lincoln CB
Woodhall Spa UD	Lincolnshire, Parts of Lindsey	1898	1974	East Lindsey
Oakengates UD	Shropshire	1898	1974	The Wrekin
Amblecote UD	Staffordshire	1898	1966	absorbed by Dudley CB and Stourbridge MB
King's Norton and Northfield UD	Worcestershire	1898	1912	absorbed by Birmingham CB and Bromsgrove RD
Malvern UD	Worcestershire	1898	1974	Malvern Hills
Withernsea UD	East Riding of Yorkshire	1898	1974	Holderness
Brentwood UD	Essex	1899	1974	Brentwood
Penge UD	Kent	1899	1965	Bromley
Heysham UD	Lancashire	1899	1928	absorbed by Morecambe and Heysham MB
Tottington UD	Lancashire	1899	1974	Bury
Bourne UD	Lincolnshire, Parts of Kesteven	1899	1974	South Kesteven
Church Stretton UD	Shropshire	1899	1966	absorbed by Ludlow RD
Ilminster UD	Somerset	1899	1974	Yeovil
Caterham UD (1899-1929), Caterham and Warlingham UD (1929–74)	Surrey	1899	1974	Tandridge
Westbury UD	Wiltshire	1899	1974	West Wiltshire
Southwick UD	West Sussex	1899	1974	Adur
Hessle UD	East Riding of Yorkshire	1899	1935	Haltemprice UD
Bolton upon Dearne UD	West Riding of Yorkshire	1899	1937	Dearne UD
Stanley UD	West Riding of Yorkshire	1899	1974	Wakefield

== 1900-09 ==
In the 1900s forty-six urban districts were formed and forty-one abolished, a net increase of 5, bringing the total number of urban districts to an all-time high of 818.

Urban District	County	Created	Abolished	Successor(s)
Hale UD	Cheshire	1900	1974	Trafford
Hazel Grove and Bramhall UD	Cheshire	1900	1974	Stockport
Stratton and Bude UD (1900–34), Bude-Stratton UD (1934–74)	Cornwall	1900	1974	North Cornwall
Holsworthy UD	Devon	1900	1964	absorbed by Holsworthy RD
Halesworth UD	East Suffolk	1900	1974	Waveney
Saxmundham UD	East Suffolk	1900	1974	Suffolk Coastal
Loughton UD	Essex	1900	1933	Chigwell UD
Chislehurst UD	Kent	1900	1934	Chislehurst and Sidcup UD
Poulton-le-Fylde UD	Lancashire	1900	1974	Wyre
Preesall with Hackensall UD (1900–10), Preesall UD (1910–74)	Lancashire	1900	1974	Wyre
Thornton Cleveleys UD	Lancashire	1900	1974	Wyre
Kingsbury UD	Middlesex	1900	1934	Wembley UD
Neyland UD	Pembrokeshire	1900	1974	Preseli
Wem UD	Shropshire	1900	1967	North Shropshire RD
Cudworth UD	West Riding of Yorkshire	1900	1974	Barnsley
Saddleworth UD	West Riding of Yorkshire	1900	1974	Oldham
Wheatley UD	West Riding of Yorkshire	1900	1914	absorbed by Doncaster MB
Amlwch UD	Anglesey	1901		Anglesey - Ynys Môn
Callington UD	Cornwall	1901	1934	absorbed by St Germans RD
Frinton-on-Sea UD	Essex	1901	1934	Frinton and Walton UD
Sawbridgeworth UD	Hertfordshire	1901	1974	East Hertfordshire
Sheringham UD	Norfolk	1901	1974	North Norfolk
Irthlingborough UD	Northamptonshire	1901	1974	East Northamptonshire
Compstall UD	Cheshire	1902	1936	absorbed by Bredbury and Romiley UD and Hyde MB
Ellesmere Port and Whitby UD (1902–33), Ellesmere Port UD (1933–55)	Cheshire	1902	1955	Ellesmere Port MB
Foots Cray UD (1902–21), Sidcup UD (1921–34)	Kent	1902	1934	Chislehurst and Sidcup UD
Narberth UD	Pembrokeshire	1902	1974	South Pembrokeshire
Watchet UD	Somerset	1902	1974	West Somerset
Scalby UD	North Riding of Yorkshire	1902	1974	Scarborough
Ammanford UD	Carmarthenshire	1903	1974	Dinefwr
Burry Port UD	Carmarthenshire	1903	1974	Llanelli
Bispham with Norbreck UD	Lancashire	1903	1918	absorbed by Blackpool CB
Mynyddislwyn UD	Monmouthshire	1903	1974	Islwyn
Handforth UD	Cheshire	1904	1936	absorbed by Cheadle and Gatley UD and Wilmslow UD
Torpoint UD	Cornwall	1904	1974	Caradon
Oulton Broad UD	East Suffolk	1904	1919	absorbed by Lowestoft MB
Fleet UD	Hampshire	1904	1974	Hart
Feltham UD	Middlesex	1904	1965	Hounslow
Hayes UD (1904–30), Hayes and Harlington UD (1930–65)	Middlesex	1904	1965	Hillingdon
Ruislip-Northwood UD	Middlesex	1904	1965	Hillingdon
Wolstanton United UD	Staffordshire	1904	1932	absorbed by Newcastle-under-Lyme MB
Old Fletton UD	Huntingdonshire (1905–65), Huntingdon and Peterborough (1965–74)	1905	1974	Peterborough
Formby UD	Lancashire	1905	1974	Sefton
Shap UD	Westmorland	1905	1935	absorbed by North Westmorland RD
Bushey UD	Hertfordshire	1906	1974	Hertsmere
Egham UD	Surrey	1906	1974	Runnymede
Llanwrtyd Wells UD	Brecknockshire	1907	1974	Brecknock
Fishguard UD	Pembrokeshire	1907	1934	Fishguard and Goodwick UD
Merton UD (1907–13), Merton and Morden UD (1913–65)	Surrey	1907	1965	Merton
Garforth UD	West Riding of Yorkshire	1908	1974	Leeds
Gelligaer UD	Glamorganshire	1908	1974	Rhymney Valley, Merthyr Tydfil
Thurnscoe UD	West Riding of Yorkshire	1908	1937	Dearne UD
Chester-le-Street UD	County Durham	1909	1974	Chester-le-Street
Windlesham UD	Surrey	1909	1933	Bagshot RD
Earby UD	West Riding of Yorkshire	1909	1974	Pendle

== 1910-19 ==
In the 1910s twenty-one urban districts were formed and forty-one abolished, a net decrease of 20, bringing the total number of urban districts to 798.

Urban District	County	Created	Abolished	Successor(s)
Bungay UD	East Suffolk	1910	1974	Waveney
Prudhoe UD	Northumberland	1910	1974	Tynedale
Whittington and Newbold UD	Derbyshire	1911	1920	absorbed by Chesterfield MB
Yiewsley UD (1911–29), Yiewsley and West Drayton UD (1929–65)	Middlesex	1911	1965	Hillingdon
Oakham UD	Rutland	1911	1974	Rutland
Bentley with Arksey UD	West Riding of Yorkshire	1911	1974	Doncaster
Cwmamman UD	Carmarthenshire	1912	1974	Dinefwr
Tilbury UD	Essex	1912	1936	Thurrock UD
Bedwas and Machen UD	Monmouthshire	1912	1974	Rhymney Valley
Longbenton UD	Northumberland	1912	1974	North Tyneside
Seaton Delaval UD	Northumberland	1912	1935	Seaton Valley UD, absorbed by Blyth MB and Whitley Bay UD
Chorleywood UD	Hertfordshire	1913	1974	Three Rivers
Oadby UD	Leicestershire	1913	1974	Oadby and Wigston
Haslemere UD	Surrey	1913	1974	Waverley
Market Drayton UD	Shropshire	1914	1966	Market Drayton RD
Axminster UD	Devon	1915	1953	absorbed by Axminster RD
Beddington and Wallington UD	Surrey	1915	1937	Beddington and Wallington MB
Coulsdon and Purley UD	Surrey	1915	1965	Croydon
Mitcham UD	Surrey	1915	1934	Mitcham MB
Adwick le Street UD	West Riding of Yorkshire	1915	1974	Doncaster
Spenborough UD	West Riding of Yorkshire	1915	1955	Spenborough MB
Stratford and Wolverton UD (1919–20), Wolverton UD (1920–74)	Buckinghamshire	1919	1974	Milton Keynes
Letchworth UD	Hertfordshire	1919	1974	North Hertfordshire

== 1920-29 ==
In the 1920s twenty-five urban districts were formed and thirty-nine abolished, a net decrease of 14, bringing the total number of urban districts to 784.

Urban District	County	Created	Abolished	Successor(s)
Crayford UD	Kent	1920	1965	Bexley
Conisbrough UD	West Riding of Yorkshire	1921	1974	Doncaster
Hemsworth UD	West Riding of Yorkshire	1921	1974	Wakefield
Bebington and Bromborough UD (1922–33), Bebington UD (1933–37)	Cheshire	1922	1937	Bebington MB
Washington UD	County Durham	1922	1974	Sunderland
Billingham UD	County Durham	1923	1968	absorbed by Stockton RD and Teesside CB
Burton Latimer UD	Northamptonshire	1923	1974	Kettering
Goodwick UD	Pembrokeshire	1923	1934	Fishguard and Goodwick UD
Maltby UD	West Riding of Yorkshire	1924	1974	Rotherham
Halesowen UD	Worcestershire	1925	1936	Halesowen MB
Thurstonland and Farnley Tyas UD	West Riding of Yorkshire	1925	1938	absorbed by Holmfirth UD and Kirkburton UD
Canvey Island UD	Essex	1926	1974	Castle Point
Dagenham UD	Essex	1926	1938	Dagenham MB
Hornchurch UD	Essex	1926	1965	Havering
West Mersea UD	Essex	1926	1974	Colchester
Milton UD	Hampshire	1926	1932	absorbed by Lymington MB
Swanscombe UD	Kent	1926	1974	Dartford
Sandy UD	Bedfordshire	1927	1974	Mid Bedfordshire
Mangotsfield UD	Gloucestershire	1927	1974	Kingswood
Welwyn Garden City UD	Hertfordshire	1927	1974	Welwyn Hatfield
Brentford and Chiswick UD	Middlesex	1927	1932	Brentford and Chiswick MB
Headington UD	Oxfordshire	1927	1929	absorbed by Oxford CB
Bedworth UD	Warwickshire	1928	1974	Nuneaton
Benfleet UD	Essex	1929	1974	Castle Point
Purfleet UD	Essex	1929	1936	Thurrock UD
Rayleigh UD	Essex	1929	1974	Rochford

== 1930-39 ==
In the 1930s forty-one urban districts were formed and two hundred fifty-three abolished, a net decrease of 212, bringing the total number of urban districts to 572. This was largely due to the County review orders instigated by the Local Government Act 1929.

Urban District	County	Created	Abolished	Successor(s)
Llwchwr UD	Glamorganshire	1930	1974	Lliw Valley
Sittingbourne and Milton UD	Kent	1930	1974	Swale
Solihull UD	Warwickshire	1932	1954	Solihull MB
Saltburn and Marske-by-the-Sea UD	North Riding of Yorkshire	1932	1974	Langbaurgh
Wirral UD	Cheshire	1933	1974	Wirral
Chigwell UD	Essex	1933	1974	Epping Forest
Sandown-Shanklin UD	Isle of Wight	1933	1974	South Wight
Norton-Radstock UD	Somerset	1933	1974	Wansdyke
Banstead UD	Surrey	1933	1974	Reigate and Banstead
Walton and Weybridge UD	Surrey	1933	1974	Elmbridge
Camborne-Redruth UD	Cornwall	1934	1974	Kerrier
Billericay UD	Essex	1934	1955	Basildon UD
Frinton and Walton UD	Essex	1934	1974	Tendring
Wanstead and Woodford UD	Essex	1934	1937	Wanstead and Woodford MB
Chislehurst and Sidcup UD	Kent	1934	1965	Bexley, Bromley
Orpington UD	Kent	1934	1965	Bromley
Potters Bar UD	Middlesex (1934–65), Hertfordshire (1965–74)	1934	1974	Hertsmere
Aldridge UD	Staffordshire	1934	1966	Aldridge-Brownhills UD
Fishguard and Goodwick UD	Pembrokeshire	1934	1974	Preseli
Abergele UD	Denbighshire	1935	1974	Colwyn
Cwmbran UD	Monmouthshire	1935	1974	Torfaen
Staveley UD	Derbyshire	1935	1974	Chesterfield
Wymondham UD	Norfolk	1935	1974	South Norfolk
Seaton Valley UD	Northumberland	1935	1974	Blyth Valley, North Tyneside
Beeston and Stapleford UD	Nottinghamshire	1935	1974	Broxtowe
Lakes UD	Westmorland	1935	1974	Eden, South Lakeland
Haltemprice UD	East Riding of Yorkshire	1935	1974	Beverley
Whaley Bridge UD	Derbyshire	1936	1974	High Peak
Boldon UD	County Durham	1936	1974	South Tyneside
Thurrock UD	Essex	1936	1974	Thurrock, Basildon
Crook and Willington UD	County Durham	1937	1974	Wear Valley
Aireborough UD	West Riding of Yorkshire	1937	1974	Leeds
Colne Valley UD	West Riding of Yorkshire	1937	1974	Kirklees
Dearne UD	West Riding of Yorkshire	1937	1974	Barnsley
Hebden Royd UD	West Riding of Yorkshire	1937	1974	Calderdale
Queensbury and Shelf UD	West Riding of Yorkshire	1937	1974	Calderdale, Bradford
Ripponden UD	West Riding of Yorkshire	1937	1974	Calderdale
Sowerby Bridge UD	West Riding of Yorkshire	1937	1974	Calderdale
Keynsham UD	Somerset	1938	1974	Wansdyke
Denby Dale UD	West Riding of Yorkshire	1938	1974	Kirklees
Corby UD	Northamptonshire	1939	1974	Corby

== 1940-74 ==
From 1940 until their abolition in 1974, there were only six more urban districts formed and a further fifty-six abolished, a net decrease of 50, bringing the total number of urban districts to 522.

Urban District	County	Created	Abolished	Successor(s)
Basildon UD	Essex	1955	1974	Basildon
Harlow UD	Essex	1955	1974	Harlow
Crawley UD	West Sussex	1956	1974	Crawley
Kirkby UD	Lancashire	1958	1974	Knowsley
Leighton-Linslade UD	Bedfordshire	1965	1974	South Bedfordshire
Aldridge-Brownhills UD	Staffordshire	1966	1974	Walsall
