= Horncastle Urban District =

Former local government area in the UK

Horncastle
- Horncastle Urban District shown within Parts of Lindsey in 1970
- Area
  - 1911: 1,421 acres (5.75 km^{2})
  - 1961: 1,421 acres (5.75 km^{2})
- Population
  - 1911: 3,900
  - 1961: 3,771
- History
  - Created: 1894
  - Abolished: 1974
  - Succeeded by: East Lindsey
- Status: Urban District
- Government: Horncastle Urban District Council
  - HQ: Horncastle

Horncastle was an Urban District in Parts of Lindsey, Lincolnshire, England, from 1894 to 1974. It was created under the Local Government Act 1894 (56 & 57 Vict. c. 73).

The district was abolished in 1974 under the Local Government Act 1972 and combined with various other local government districts in the eastern part of Lindsey to form the new East Lindsey district.
