= 2023 East Lindsey District Council election =

2023 English local election

- 4 May 2023

All 55 seats on East Lindsey District Council 28 seats needed for a majority

	First party	Second party	Third party
Leader	Craig Leyland		Ros Jackson
Party	Conservative	Independent	Labour
Last election	29 seats, 49.7%	12 seats, 15.0%	7 seats, 23.1%
Seats before	31	11 (Note: Of the eleven independent councillors prior to the election, eight sat as the "Independents" group led by Jill Makinson-Sanders, one sat with the Liberal Democrat as the "Liberal Democrat/Independent" group and the other two did not belong to a group.)	6
Seats after	26	16	6
Seat change	▼3	▲4	▼1
Popular vote	13,270	9,043	7,950
Percentage	38.4%	26.2%	23.0%
Swing	▼11.3%	▲11.2%	▼0.1%
	Fourth party	Fifth party	Sixth party
Leader	Danny Brookes		Fiona Martin
Party	Skegness Urban District Society	Green	Liberal Democrats
Last election	6 seats, 9.4%	n/a	1 seats, 2.2%
Seats before	6	0	1
Seats after	5	1	1
Seat change	▼1	▲1	Steady
Popular vote	2,872	1,369	n/a
Percentage	8.3%	4.0%	n/a
Swing	▼1.1%	▲4.0%	n/a
- Results by ward
Leader before election
Craig Leyland
Conservative
Leader after election
Craig Leyland
Conservative
No overall control

The 2023 East Lindsey District Council election took place on 4 May 2023, to elect all 55 members of East Lindsey District Council in Lincolnshire, England. This was on the same day as other local elections across England.

Prior to the election the Conservatives held a majority of the seats on the council. There were thirteen seats (24%) that were elected unopposed in 2023, of which ten were taken by the Conservatives, two by independents and one by the Liberal Democrats.

The council went under no overall control following the election. The Conservatives remained the largest party but lost their majority. They managed to form a minority administration and their leader, Craig Leyland, kept his position as leader of the council.

== Results ==
The overall results were as follows:

2023 East Lindsey District Council election
Party	Seats	Gains	Losses	Net gain/loss	Seats %	Votes %	Votes	+/−
Conservative	26	3	6	▼3	47.3	38.4	13,270	
Independent	16	5	1	▲4	29.1	26.2	9,043	
Labour	6	1	2	▼1	10.9	23.0	7,950	
Skegness Urban District Society	5	0	1	▼1	9.1	8.3	2,872	
Green	1	1	0	▲1	1.8	4.0	1,369	
Reform	0	0	0	Steady	0.0	0.2	61	
Liberal Democrats	1	0	0	Steady	1.8	n/a	n/a	

== Ward results ==
The results for each ward were as follows, with an asterisk (*) indicating an incumbent councillor standing for re-election.

=== Alford ===
Alford
Party	Candidate	Votes	%	±%
Conservative	Sarah Caroline Devereux*	510	55.0	
Conservative	Graham Anthony Marsh*	365	39.4	
Independent	Alan Vassar	316	34.1	
Labour	Edward John David Green (Ed Green)	219	23.6	
Labour	Cameron Joshua Marnoch	185	20.0	
Turnout		927	24.67	
Registered electors		3,815		
Conservative hold				
Conservative hold				

=== Binbrook ===
Binbrook
Party	Candidate	Votes	%	±%
Conservative	Richard Geoffrey Fry*	415	67.2	
Labour	Jacob Frederick Croft	203	32.8	
Turnout		618	31.64	
Registered electors		1,988		
Conservative hold				

=== Burgh le Marsh ===
Burgh le Marsh
Party	Candidate	Votes	%	±%
Skegness Urban District Society	James William Brookes* (Jimmy Brookes)	283	48.3	
Conservative	Susan Anita Jane Blackburn	156	26.6	
Independent	Neil Douglas Luther Cooper	147	25.1	
Turnout		586	28.50	
Registered electors		2,102		
Skegness Urban District Society hold				

=== Chapel St Leonards ===
Chapel St Leonards
Party	Candidate	Votes	%	±%
Conservative	Stephen Anthony Evans*	486	47.1	
Labour	Roger Alan Dawson	443	43.0	
Independent	Graham John Fisher	408	39.6	
Conservative	Dilys Carolyn Jenkinson	356	34.5	
Turnout		1,031	26.39	
Registered electors		3,918		
Conservative hold				
Labour gain from Conservative				

=== Coningsby and Mareham ===
Coningsby and Mareham
Party	Candidate	Votes	%	±%
Conservative	Martin John Foster*	unopposed		
Conservative	Alex Martin Hall*	unopposed		
Conservative	James Andrew Knowles	unopposed		
Conservative hold				
Conservative hold				
Conservative hold				

=== Croft ===
Croft
Party	Candidate	Votes	%	±%
Conservative	Sid Dennis*	unopposed		
Conservative hold				

=== Friskney ===
Friskney
Party	Candidate	Votes	%	±%
Independent	Carleen Dickinson*	249	60.0	
Conservative	Carl David Drury	166	40.0	
Turnout		415	23.71	
Registered electors		1,784		
Independent hold				

=== Fulstow ===
Fulstow
Party	Candidate	Votes	%	±%
Independent	Edward Peel Mossop*	unopposed		
Independent hold				

=== Grimoldby ===
Grimoldby
Party	Candidate	Votes	%	±%
Independent	Terence John Knowles* (Terry Knowles)	346	73.9	
Labour	David Richard Hoyles	122	26.1	
Turnout		468	25.5	
Registered electors		1,855		
Independent hold				

=== Hagworthingham ===
Hagworthingham
Party	Candidate	Votes	%	±%
Conservative	William Joseph Grover* (Will Grover)	317	48.7	
Independent	David Vernon Powell	179	27.5	
Green	Paul Fisher	155	23.8	
Turnout		651	33.99	
Registered electors		1,930		
Conservative hold				

=== Halton Holegate ===
Halton Holegate
Party	Candidate	Votes	%	±%
Conservative	Terry Taylor*	unopposed		
Conservative gain from Independent				

Terry Taylor had won the seat in a by-election in 2022; in 2019 the seat had been won by independent councillor Jim Swanson. Seat shown as Conservative gain from independent to allow comparison with 2019 results.

=== Holton-le-Clay and North Thoresby ===
Holton-le-Clay and North Thoresby
Party	Candidate	Votes	%	±%
Independent	Terence F. Aldridge* (Terry Aldridge)	684	59.4	
Conservative	Stephen Keith Lyons	528	45.9	
Labour	Phillip Martin Smith* (Phyll Smith)	449	39.0	
Turnout		1,151	28.45	
Registered electors		4,060		
Independent hold				
Conservative gain from Labour				

=== Horncastle ===
Horncastle
Party	Candidate	Votes	%	±%
Conservative	Richard Martin Avison*	unopposed		
Independent	Sandra Campbell-Wardman*	unopposed		
Liberal Democrats	Fiona Martin*	unopposed		
Conservative hold				
Independent hold				
Liberal Democrats hold				

=== Ingoldmells ===
Ingoldmells
Party	Candidate	Votes	%	±%
Conservative	Colin John Davie*	242	59.9	
Skegness Urban District Society	Jason Lawrence Boswell-Larkum (Jason Boswell)	162	40.1	
Turnout		404	24.61	
Registered electors		1,662		
Conservative hold				

=== Legbourne ===
Legbourne
Party	Candidate	Votes	%	±%
Conservative	Adam Grist*	415	65.9	
Labour	Hannah Filer	215	34.1	
Turnout		630	33.81	
Registered electors		1,872		
Conservative hold				

=== Mablethorpe ===
Mablethorpe
Party	Candidate	Votes	%	±%
Labour	Graham Edward Cullen*	1,159	62.5	
Labour	Claire Elizabeth Arnold*	909	49.0	
Labour	Kate Marnoch	857	46.2	
Conservative	Martin Victor Clark (Victor Clark)	692	37.3	
Conservative	Carl Ian Tebbutt	631	34.0	
Turnout		1,854	28.65	
Registered electors		6,566		
Labour hold				
Labour hold				
Labour hold				

=== Marshchapel and Somercotes ===
Marshchapel and Somercotes
Party	Candidate	Votes	%	±%
Conservative	Daniel McNally*	717	63.3	
Conservative	Paul John Rickett*	558	49.2	
Labour	Freddie William Mossop	374	33.0	
Independent	Helena Poskitt	185	16.3	
Independent	Patricia Maureen Midgley	64	5.6	
Turnout		1,133	31.05	
Registered electors		3,665		
Conservative hold				
Conservative hold				

=== North Holme ===
North Holme
Party	Candidate	Votes	%	±%
Labour	David James Ernest Hall*	239	49.3	
Conservative	Kirsty Corbitt	142	29.3	
Independent	Karen Elizabeth Parsons	104	21.4	
Turnout		485	23.21	
Registered electors		2,098		
Labour hold				

=== Priory and St James' ===
Priory and St James'
Party	Candidate	Votes	%	±%
Independent	Andrew Leonard*	511	51.0	
Independent	Darren Lee Hobson	464	46.3	
Independent	Lynne Marie Cooney	360	35.9	
Conservative	Pauline Frances Watson	258	25.7	
Turnout		1,002	27.68	
Registered electors		3,641		
Independent hold				
Independent gain from Labour				

The other previous incumbent, Sarah Parkin, had been elected as a Labour councillor in 2019 but left the party later that year and sat as an independent for the rest of her term of office. Seat shown as independent gain from Labour to allow comparison with 2019 results.

=== Roughton ===
Roughton
Party	Candidate	Votes	%	±%
Conservative	William Gray*	unopposed		
Conservative hold				

=== Scarbrough and Seacroft ===
Scarbrough and Seacroft
Party	Candidate	Votes	%	±%
Conservative	David Richard Edginton* (Dick Edginton)	598	43.3	
Conservative	Stephen Russell Kirk* (Steve Kirk)	593	42.9	
Skegness Urban District Society	Billy Brookes*	539	39.0	
Conservative	Julie Day Sadler	510	36.9	
Labour	Paul Collins	462	33.5	
Skegness Urban District Society	Adrian David Findley	394	28.5	
Skegness Urban District Society	Robert Michael Walker (Bob Walker)	355	25.7	
Turnout		1,381	20.32	
Registered electors		6,817		
Conservative hold				
Conservative hold				
Skegness Urban District Society hold				

=== Sibsey and Stickney ===
Sibsey and Stickney
Party	Candidate	Votes	%	±%
Conservative	Tom Ashton*	unopposed		
Conservative	Neil Jones*	unopposed		
Conservative hold				
Conservative hold				

=== Spilsby ===
Spilsby
Party	Candidate	Votes	%	±%
Independent	Eleanor Louisa Marsh (Ellie Marsh)	250	52.3	
Conservative	David Michael Mangion*	228	47.7	
Turnout		478	21.1	
Registered electors		2,289		
Independent hold				

David Mangion had been elected in 2019 as an independent, but joined the Conservatives in 2020. Seat shown as an independent hold to allow comparison with 2019 results.

=== St Clement's ===
St Clement's
Party	Candidate	Votes	%	±%
Skegness Urban District Society	Mark Vincent Dannatt*	295	36.6	
Skegness Urban District Society	Richard Cunnington*	290	36.0	
Labour	Mark Crawford Anderson	276	34.3	
Labour	Nicholas Gary Bryan Walton (Nick Walton)	238	29.6	
Conservative	Allison Margaret Miller-Ross (Ally Miller-Ross)	229	28.4	
Conservative	Lynn Miller-Ross	218	27.1	
Turnout		805	20.2	
Registered electors		4,025		
Skegness Urban District Society hold				
Skegness Urban District Society hold				

=== St Margaret's ===
St Margaret's
Party	Candidate	Votes	%	±%
Conservative	Samuel William Howard Kemp (Sam Kemp)	227	38.1	
Labour	Hannah Leanne Watkins	201	33.7	
Independent	Susan Jean Crew (Sue Crew)	168	28.2	
Turnout		596	29.59	
Registered electors		2,028		
Conservative hold				

=== St Mary's ===
St Mary's
Party	Candidate	Votes	%	±%
Independent	Gillian Mary Makinson-Sanders* (Jill Makinson-Sanders)	581	84.9	
Conservative	Stuart Watson	69	10.1	
Independent	Maurice Bellwood	34	5.0	
Turnout		684	36.81	
Registered electors		1,861		
Independent hold				

=== St Michael's ===
St Michael's
Party	Candidate	Votes	%	±%
Independent	George Edward Horton*	379	70.2	
Labour	Laura Marie Stephenson	161	29.8	
Turnout		540	29.65	
Registered electors		1,828		
Independent hold				

=== Sutton on Sea ===
Sutton on Sea
Party	Candidate	Votes	%	±%
Green	Robert William Watson	1,048	67.3	
Independent	Stefanie Le Ann Bristow (Stef Bristow)	654	42.0	
Conservative	Adrian Victor Benjamin*	403	25.9	
Conservative	Helen Angela Matthews*	399	25.6	
Turnout		1,558	40.62	
Registered electors		3,845		
Green gain from Conservative				
Independent gain from Conservative				

=== Tetford and Donington ===
Tetford and Donington
Party	Candidate	Votes	%	±%
Independent	Daniel Anthony Simpson	395	49.5	
Conservative	David George Andrews*	229	28.7	
Labour	Anthony Charles Cox (Tony Cox)	91	11.4	
Green	Peter Edward Skipworth	83	10.4	
Turnout		798	40.11	
Registered electors		1,997		
Independent gain from Conservative				

=== Tetney ===
Tetney
Party	Candidate	Votes	%	±%
Independent	Steven John McMillan* (Steve McMillan)	395	75.0	
Labour	Christopher D. Lyons	132	25.0	
Turnout		527	25.9	
Registered electors		2,062		
Independent hold				

=== Trinity ===
Trinity
Party	Candidate	Votes	%	±%
Labour	Rosalind Alice Jackson* (Ros Jackson)	249	65.5	
Independent	Malcolm David Lamb	131	34.5	
Turnout		380	20.99	
Registered electors		1,810		
Labour hold				

=== Wainfleet ===
Wainfleet
Party	Candidate	Votes	%	±%
Conservative	Wendy Bowkett*	unopposed		
Conservative hold				

=== Willoughby with Sloothby ===
Willoughby with Sloothby
Party	Candidate	Votes	%	±%
Independent	Stephen William Eyre*	508	82.1	
Labour	Isaac George Bailey	111	17.9	
Turnout		619	31.44	
Registered electors		1,991		
Independent hold				

=== Winthorpe ===
Winthorpe
Party	Candidate	Votes	%	±%
Conservative	Carl Stuart Macey	332	40.1	
Skegness Urban District Society	Daniel Brookes* (Danny Brookes)	307	37.1	
Conservative	Stephen James O'Dare (Steve O'Dare)	292	35.3	
Skegness Urban District Society	Trevor Paul Burnham*	247	29.8	
Labour	Kevin Evans	163	19.7	
Labour	Carole Irene Clark	150	18.1	
Green	Philip William Gaskell (Phil Gaskell)	83	10.0	
Turnout		828	19.58	
Registered electors		4,269		
Conservative gain from Skegness Urban District Society				
Skegness Urban District Society hold				

=== Withern and Theddlethorpe ===
Withern and Theddlethorpe
Party	Candidate	Votes	%	±%
Independent	Travis Stephen Hesketh	461	55.8	
Conservative	Sandra Diane Harrison*	264	32.0	
Labour	Stephen Anthony Holland (Steve Holland)	101	12.2	
Turnout		826	39.68	
Registered electors		2,094		
Independent gain from Conservative				

=== Woodhall Spa ===
Woodhall Spa
Party	Candidate	Votes	%	±%
Conservative	Craig James Leyland*	803	58.9	
Conservative	Thomas James Kemp*	658	48.3	
Independent	John Sanderson	479	35.1	
Independent	Rebecca Louise Shaw (Becky Shaw)	294	21.6	
Labour	Ellen Wright	241	17.7	
Turnout		1,363	36.99	
Registered electors		3,706		
Conservative hold				
Conservative hold				

=== Wragby ===
Wragby
Party	Candidate	Votes	%	±%
Independent	Ruchira Asthana Yarsley (Ru Yarsley)	297	47.7	
Conservative	Julie Angela Platt*	264	42.4	
Reform	Sean Roger Matthews	61	9.8	
Turnout		622	30.32	
Registered electors		2,071		
Independent gain from Conservative				

== By-elections ==
=== Chapel St Leonards ===
Chapel St Leonards by-election: 13 November 2025
Party	Candidate	Votes	%	±%
Reform	Paul Sutton	586	65.8	N/A
Conservative	Alan Vassar	139	15.6	–20.8
Independent	Valerie Worley	60	6.7	N/A
Labour	Carole Clark	48	5.4	–27.7
Liberal Democrats	David Tucker	42	4.7	N/A
Independent	Jason Boswell	15	1.7	N/A
Majority		447	50.2	N/A
Turnout		891	23.0	–3.4
Registered electors		3,881		
Reform gain from Conservative				
