= Skegness Urban District =

Former local government area in the UK

Skegness
- Skegness Urban District shown within Parts of Lindsey in 1970
- Area
  - 1911: 1,922 acres (7.78 km^{2})
  - 1961: 3,862 acres (15.63 km^{2})
- Population
  - 1911: 3,775
  - 1961: 12,847
- History
  - Created: 1894
  - Abolished: 1974
  - Succeeded by: East Lindsey
- Status: Urban District
- Government: Skegness Urban District Council
  - HQ: Skegness

Skegness was an Urban District in Parts of Lindsey, Lincolnshire, England, from 1894 to 1974. It was created under the Local Government Act 1894.

It was enlarged in 1926 when the Winthorpe civil parish was transferred to the district.

The district was abolished in 1974 under the Local Government Act 1972 and combined with various other local government districts in the eastern part of Lindsey to form the new East Lindsey district.
