= Oakham Urban District =

Former local government area in the UK

Coordinates: 52.65°N 0.75°W

Oakham
- Oakham Urban District shown within Rutland in 1970
- Population
  - 1911: 3,667
  - 1961: 4,089
- History
  - Created: 1911
  - Abolished: 1974
  - Succeeded by: Rutland
- Status: Urban District
- Government: Oakham Urban District Council
  - HQ: Oakham

Oakham was an Urban District in Rutland, England, from 1911 to 1974. It was created under the Local Government Act 1894.

Oakham Rural District had included the parish of Oakham until 1911, when it was constituted as Oakham Urban District.

The urban district was abolished in 1974 under the Local Government Act 1972 and combined with the other local government districts of Rutland to form the new Rutland district of Leicestershire. Rutland subsequently regained county status and became a unitary authority in 1997.

== Premises ==
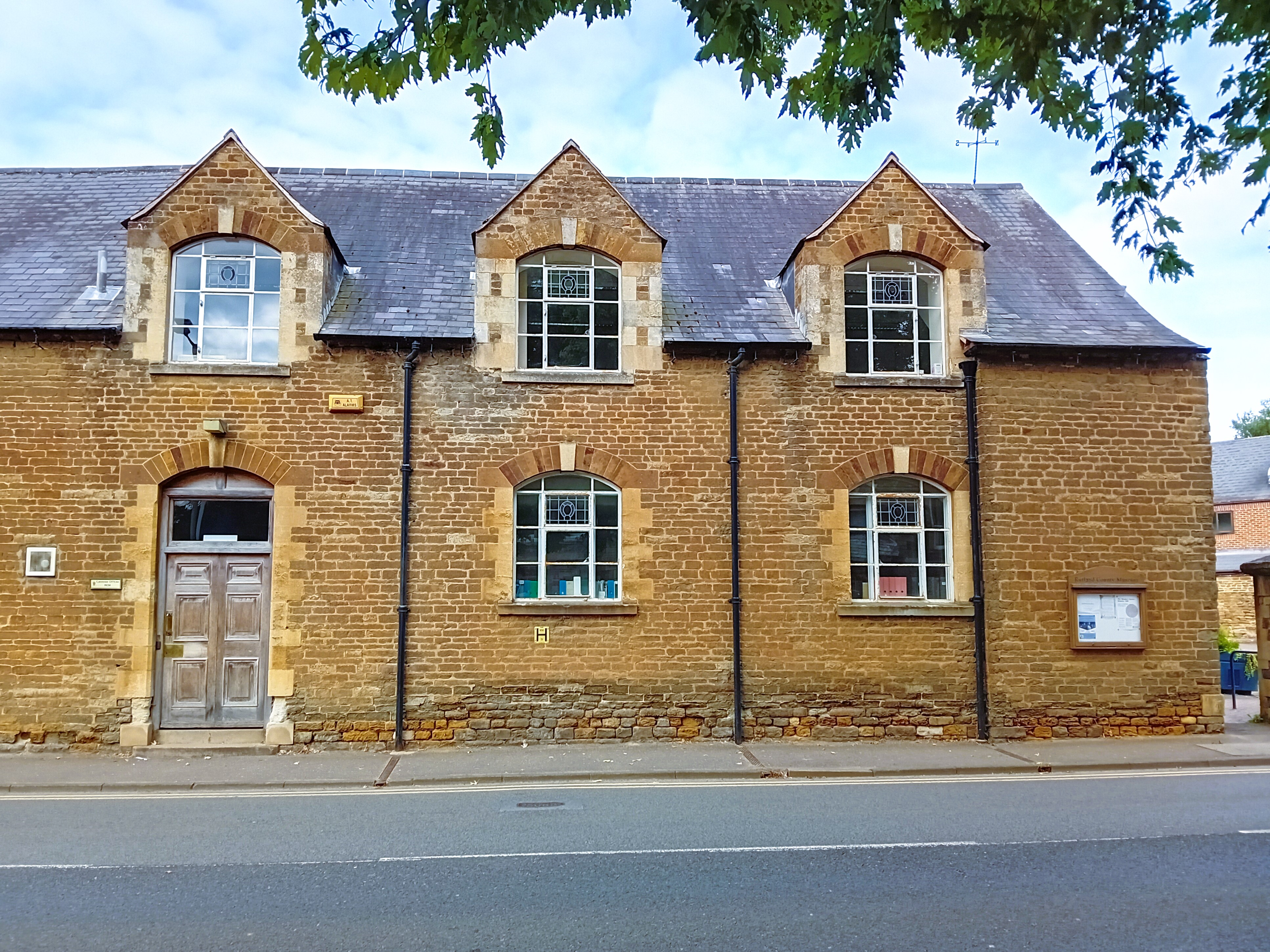
Building in Catmos Street which served as council's headquarters 1938–1974

Oakham Urban District Council initially met at Victoria Hall on the High Street, with its administrative offices split between various other buildings. In 1938 the council bought part of the former Rutland Fencible Cavalry riding school (built 1794/5) on Catmos Street and converted it into its offices and meeting place. After the council's abolition in 1974 its former headquarters were absorbed into the neighbouring Rutland County Museum, which had been established in the other part of the old riding school in 1967.
