= Woodhall Spa Urban District =

Urban district in Parts of Lindsey, Lincolnshire, England

Woodhall Spa
- Woodhall Spa Urban District shown within Parts of Lindsey in 1970
- Area
  - 1911: 1,874 acres (7.58 km^{2})
  - 1961: 1,874 acres (7.58 km^{2})
- Population
  - 1911: 1,484
  - 1961: 1,978
- History
  - Created: 1898
  - Abolished: 1974
  - Succeeded by: East Lindsey
- Status: Urban District
- Government: Woodhall Spa Urban District Council
  - HQ: Woodhall Spa

Woodhall Spa was an Urban District in Parts of Lindsey, Lincolnshire, England, from 1898 to 1974. It was created under the Local Government Act 1894.

The district was abolished in 1974 under the Local Government Act 1972 and combined with various other local government districts in the eastern part of Lindsey to form the new East Lindsey district.
