= Municipal Borough of Louth =

Former local government area in the UK

Louth
- Municipal Borough of Louth shown within Parts of Lindsey in 1970.
- Area
  - 1911: 2,749 acres (11.12 km^{2})
  - 1961: 2,816 acres (11.40 km^{2})
- Population
  - 1911: 9,880
  - 1961: 11,564
- History
  - Created: 1835
  - Abolished: 1974
  - Succeeded by: East Lindsey
- Status: Municipal borough
- Government: Louth Borough Council
  - HQ: Louth

Louth was a Municipal Borough in Parts of Lindsey, Lincolnshire, England from 1835 to 1974. It was formed under the Municipal Corporations Act 1835 from the Ancient Borough of Louth.

The borough was abolished in 1974 under the Local Government Act 1972 and combined with various other local government districts in the eastern part of Lindsey to form the new East Lindsey district.
