= Alford Urban District =

Former local government area in the UK

Alford
- Alford Urban District shown within Parts of Lindsey in 1970
- Area
  - 1911: 1,138 acres (4.61 km^{2})
  - 1961: 1,138 acres (4.61 km^{2})
- Population
  - 1911: 2,394
  - 1961: 2,139
- History
  - Created: 1896
  - Abolished: 1974
  - Succeeded by: East Lindsey
- Status: Urban District
- Government: Alford Urban District Council
  - HQ: Alford

Alford was an Urban District in Parts of Lindsey, Lincolnshire, England, from 1896 to 1974. It was created under the Local Government Act 1894.

The district was abolished in 1974 under the Local Government Act 1972 and combined with various other local government districts in the eastern part of Lindsey to form the new East Lindsey district.
