= Mablethorpe and Sutton Urban District =

Former local government area of Lincolnshire, England

Mablethorpe and Sutton
- Mablethorpe and Sutton Urban District shown within Parts of Lindsey in 1970
- Area
  - 1911: 3,168 acres (12.82 km^{2})
  - 1961: 6,472 acres (26.19 km^{2})
- Population
  - 1911: 1,232
  - 1961: 5,388
- History
  - Created: 1896
  - Abolished: 1974
  - Succeeded by: East Lindsey
- Status: Urban District
- Government: Mablethorpe and Sutton Urban District Council
  - HQ: Mablethorpe

Mablethorpe and Sutton was an Urban District in Parts of Lindsey, Lincolnshire, England, from 1896 to 1974. It was created under the Local Government Act 1894.

It was enlarged in 1925 when the civil parishes of Sutton In The Marsh and Trusthorpe were transferred to the district.

The district was abolished in 1974 under the Local Government Act 1972 and combined with various other local government districts in the eastern part of Lindsey to form the new East Lindsey district.
