= East Lindsey =

Coordinates: 53.25°N 0.05°W

East Lindsey District
- Non-metropolitan district
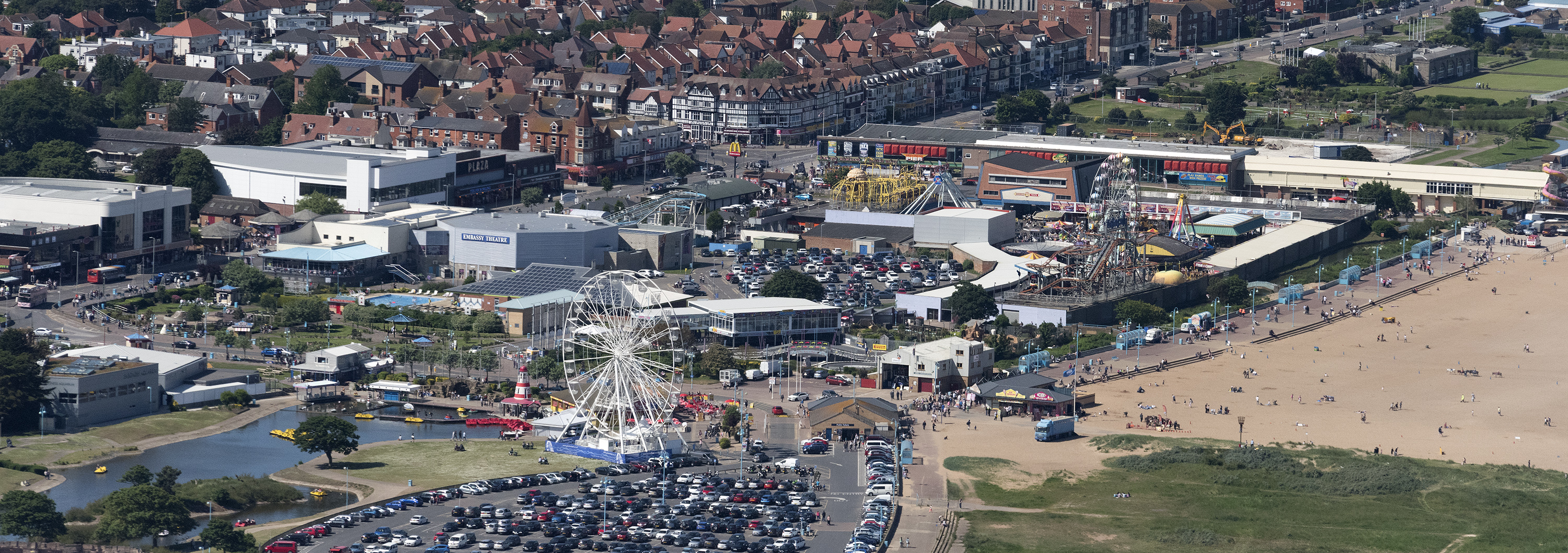
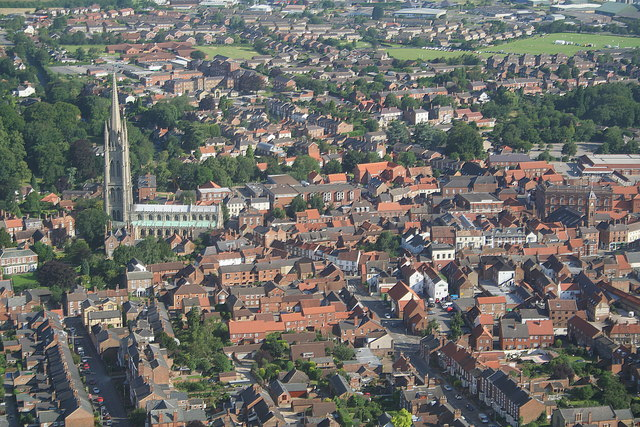
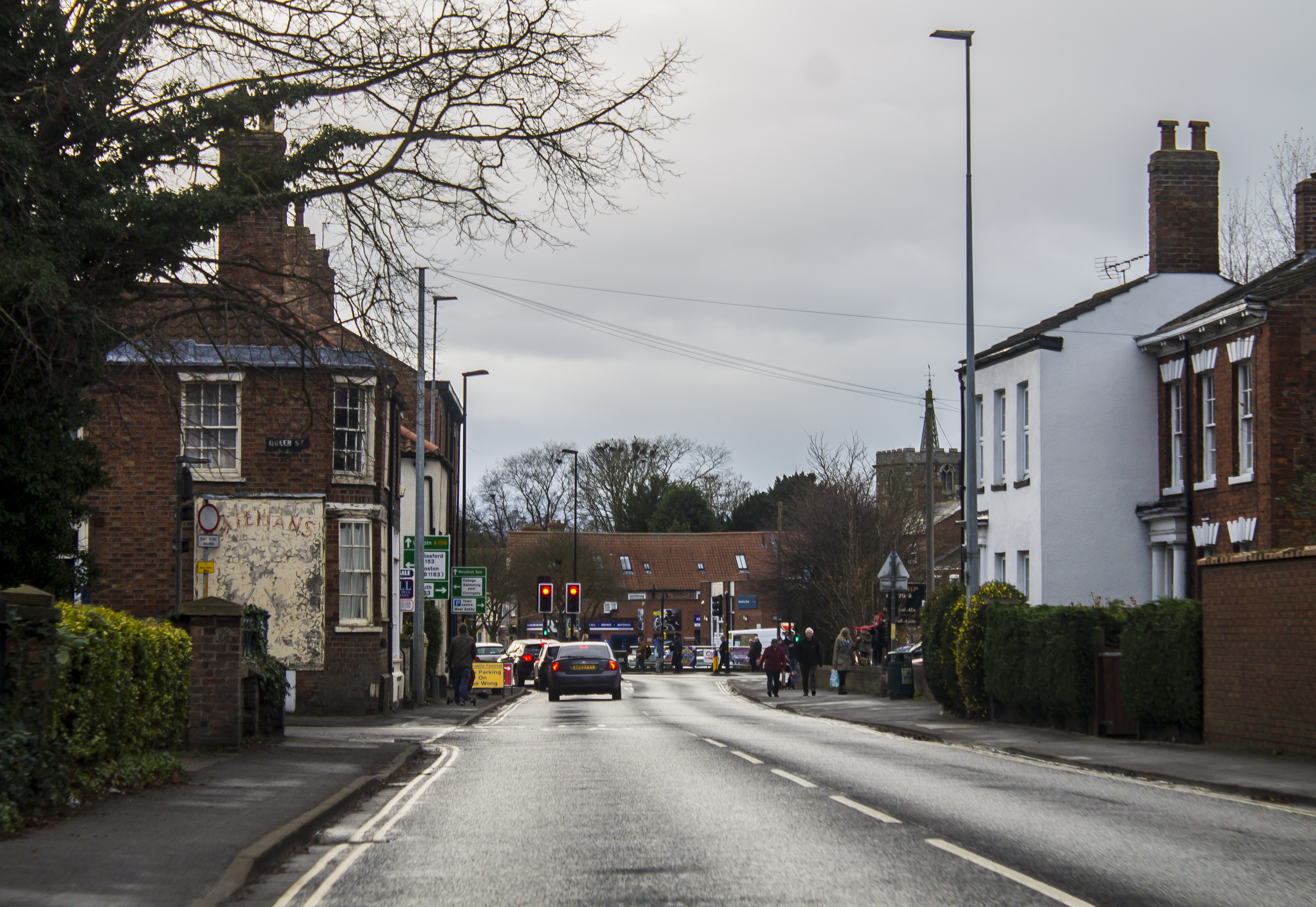
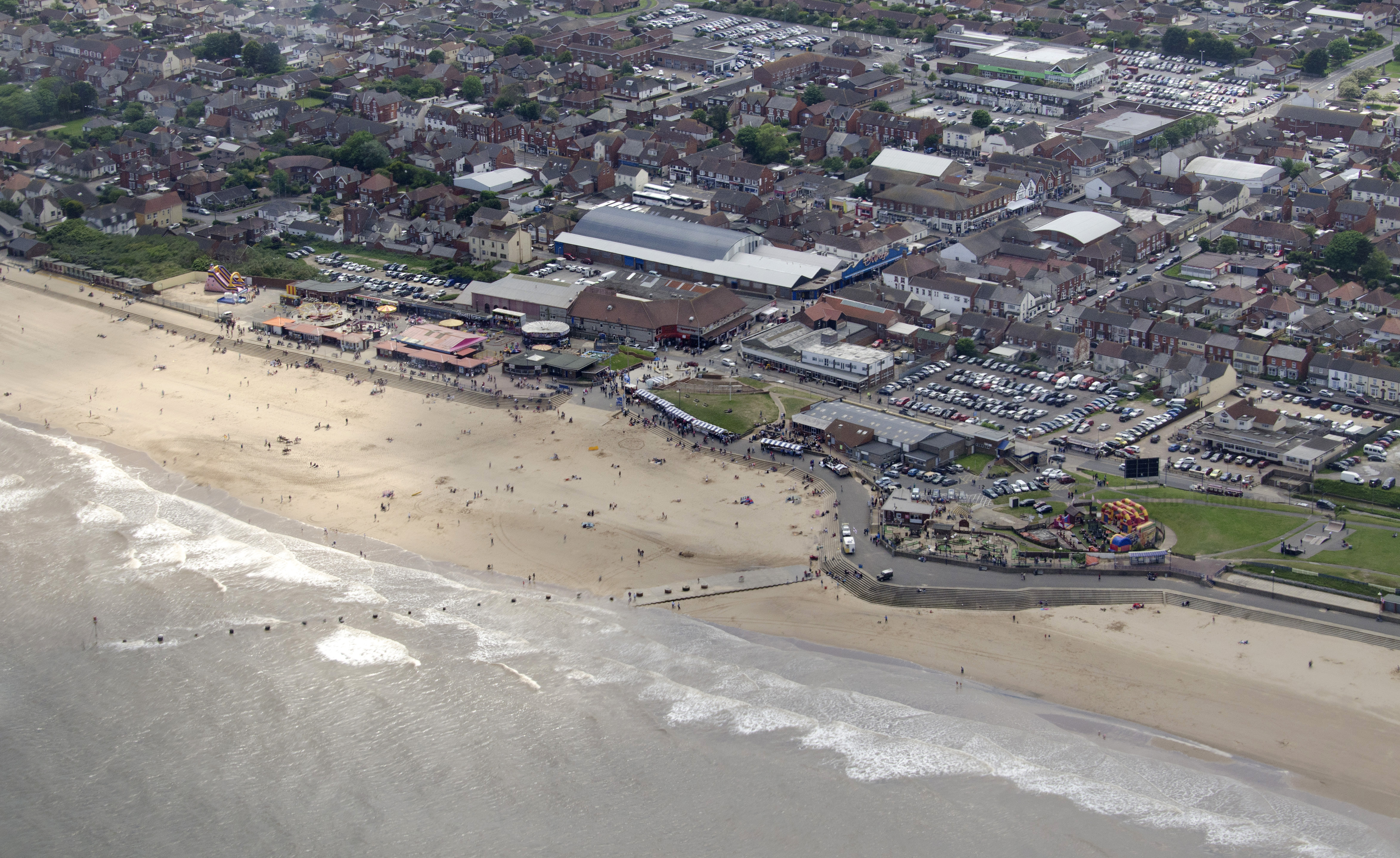
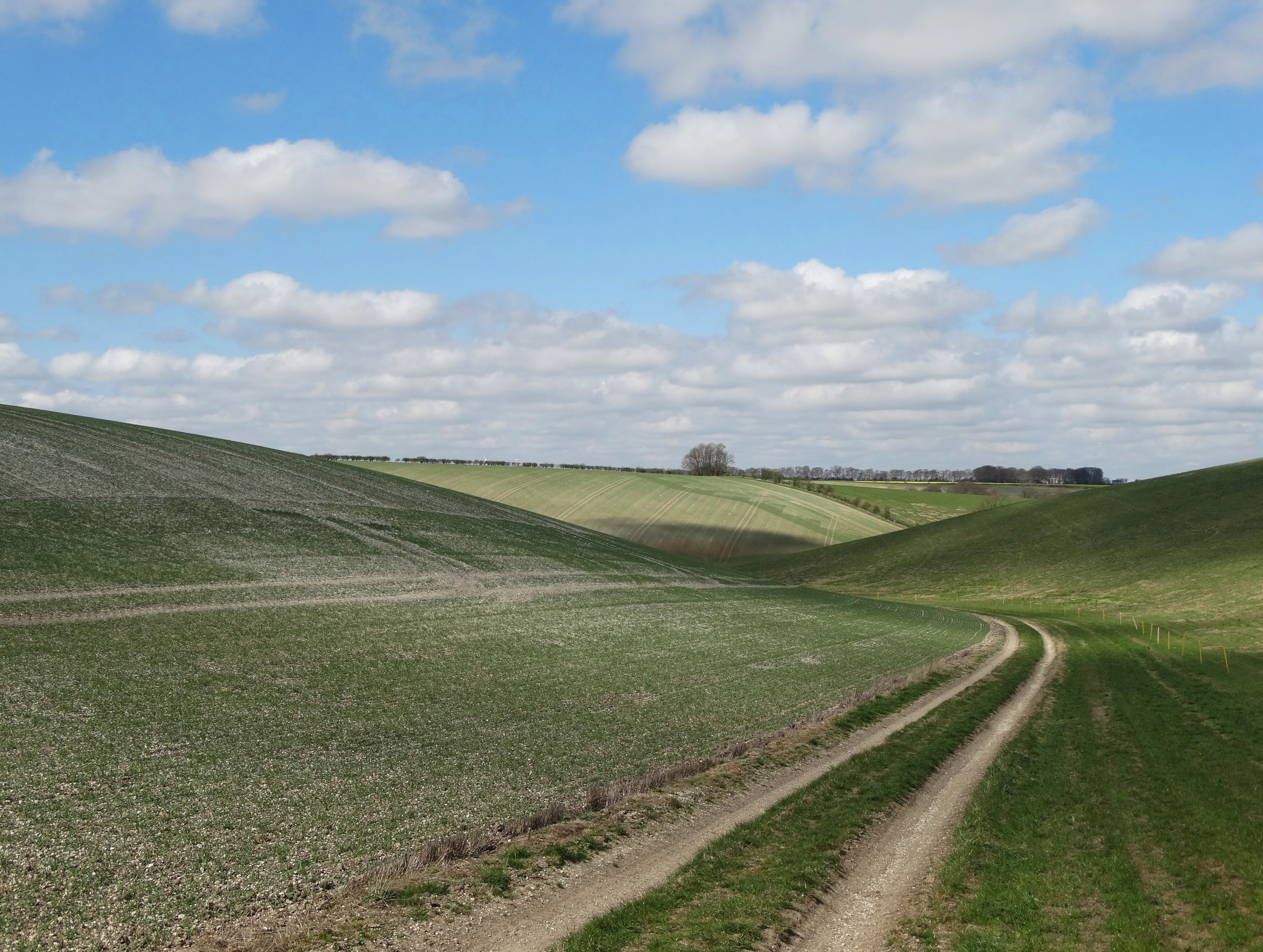
- From left to right; Top: Aerial view of Skegness; Middle: Louth and Horncastle town centre; Bottom: Mablethorpe and the Lincolnshire Wolds

- Shown within the ceremonial county of Lincolnshire
- Sovereign state: United Kingdom
- Constituent country: England
- Region: East Midlands
- Administrative county: Lincolnshire
- Founded: 1 April 1974
- Admin. HQ: Horncastle

Government
  - Type: East Lindsey District Council
  - MPs: Edward Leigh, Richard Tice, Victoria Atkins

Area
  - Total: 682 sq mi (1,767 km^{2})
  - Rank: 13th

Population (2025)
  - Total: 146,756
  - Rank: Ranked 158th
  - Density: 215.1/sq mi (83.05/km^{2})

Ethnicity (2021)
  - Ethnic groups: List: 97.8% White; 1% Mixed; 0.8% Asian; 0.2% Black; 0.2% other

Religion (2021)
  - Religion: List: 57.3% Christianity; 41.3% no religion; 0.3% Islam; 1.1% other
- Time zone: UTC+0 (Greenwich Mean Time)
  - Summer (DST): UTC+1 (British Summer Time)
- ONS code: 32UC (ONS); E07000137 (GSS)

East Lindsey is a local government district in Lincolnshire, England. Its council is based in Horncastle and the largest town is Skegness. Other towns include Alford, Burgh le Marsh, Coningsby, Louth, Mablethorpe, Spilsby, Sutton on Sea, Wainfleet All Saints, Wragby and Woodhall Spa. The district also covers a large rural area, including many smaller settlements.

The district lies on the east coast, bordering the North Sea. The north-west of the district includes part of the Lincolnshire Wolds, a designated Area of Outstanding Natural Beauty. The neighbouring districts are Boston, North Kesteven, West Lindsey and North East Lincolnshire.

== History ==
The district was created on 1 April 1974 under the Local Government Act 1972, covering nine former districts which were all abolished at the same time:

- Alford Urban District
- Horncastle Rural District
- Horncastle Urban District
- Louth Municipal Borough
- Louth Rural District
- Mablethorpe and Sutton Urban District
- Skegness Urban District
- Spilsby Rural District
- Woodhall Spa Urban District

The new district was named East Lindsey, reflecting its position within Lindsey, one of the three historic Parts of Lincolnshire, which had been an administrative county between 1889 and 1974.

In 2020 the council agreed to share its management and other staff with neighbouring Boston Borough Council. South Holland District Council joined the partnership in 2021, which is now described as the "South and East Lincolnshire Councils Partnership".

Under current local government reorganisation plans, all district councils in Lincolnshire, as well as the county council, will be abolished in 2028, with the district being combined with others and forming part of a Lincolnshire unitary authority.

== Governance ==
East Lindsey District Council

Type
- Type: Non-metropolitan district

Leadership
- Chair: Neil Jones, Conservative since 20 May 2026
- Leader: Craig Leyland, Conservative since 20 May 2015
- Chief Executive: Robert Barlow (Note: Joint chief executive of Boston Borough Council, East Lindsey District Council and South Holland District Council) since 5 December 2018

Structure
- Seats: 55 councillors
- Graph of the party split among 55 seats.
- Political groups: Administration (25) Conservative (25) Other parties (30) Labour (6) Reform (6) Liberal Democrats (2) Green (1) Independent (15)

Elections
- Voting system: First past the post
- Last election: 4 May 2023
- Next election: 6 May 2027

Meeting place
- The Hub, Mareham Road, Horncastle, LN9 6PH

Website
- www.e-lindsey.gov.uk

East Lindsey District Council provides district-level services. County-level services are provided by Lincolnshire County Council. The whole district is also covered by civil parishes, which form a third tier of local government.

=== Political control ===
The council has been under no overall control since the 2023 election, being run by a Conservative minority administration.

The first election to the council was held in 1973, initially operating as a shadow authority before coming into its powers on 1 April 1974. Political control of the council since 1974 has been as follows:

Party in control	Years
Independent	1974–2003
No overall control	2003–2015
Conservative	2015–2023
No overall control	2023–present

=== Leadership ===
The leaders of the council since 1995 have been:

Councillor	Party	From	To
Michael Capes	Independent	May 1995	May 2003
Jeremy Webb	Independent	14 May 2003	May 2007
Doreen Stephenson	Conservative	23 May 2007	May 2015
Craig Leyland	Conservative	20 May 2015	

=== Composition ===
Following the 2023 election, and subsequent changes of allegiance up to September 2026, the composition of the council was:

Party	Seats
Conservative	25
Labour	6
Reform	6
Liberal Democrats	2
Green	1
Independent	15
Total	55

Of the independent councillors, 12 sit together as the "East Lindsey Independent Group", one sits with the Liberal Democrat as the "District Independent / Liberal Democrat" group, one sits with the Green councillor as the "East Lindsey Progressives" group, and the other two are not affiliated to a group. The next election is due in 2027.

=== Elections ===
Since the last boundary changes in 2015 the council has comprised 55 councillors representing 37 wards, with each ward electing one, two or three councillors. Elections are held every four years.

=== Premises ===
The council is based at The Hub on Mareham Road in Horncastle, which was completed in 2023 as a joint campus with Boston College. Prior to that the council had its headquarters at Tedder Hall in Manby, with additional offices at Skegness Town Hall.

== Geography ==
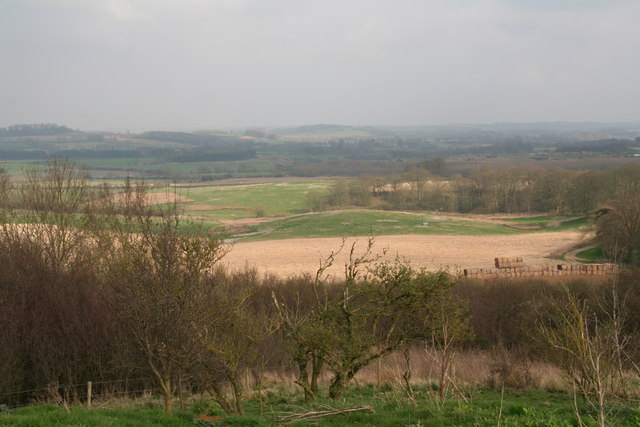
The Lincolnshire Wolds from Hoe Hill near Fulletby.

East Lindsey has an area of 1,760 km^{2}, making it the 13th largest district (and largest non-unitary district) in England.

It borders North Lincolnshire and North East Lincolnshire to the North, the North Sea to the east, Boston to the south, and North Kesteven and West Lindsey, to the west. The boundary between the district and North Kesteven, and part of Boston borough, is the River Witham. The furthest west settlement in the district is Wragby, and the furthest south is Frith Bank, around three miles from Boston.

The Lincolnshire Wolds AONB run north–south through the central and northern reaches of the district. To the east along the North Sea coast lies the Lincolnshire Marsh, with the Fens to the south and south-west.

Along the boundary with West Lindsey to the west can be found the Lincolnshire Lime Woods.

East Lindsey has a greater land area than several English counties, in particular being larger than the two-tier counties of Worcestershire, East Sussex, Surrey, and Hertfordshire.

== Economy ==
Notable Towns and Villages of East Lindsey
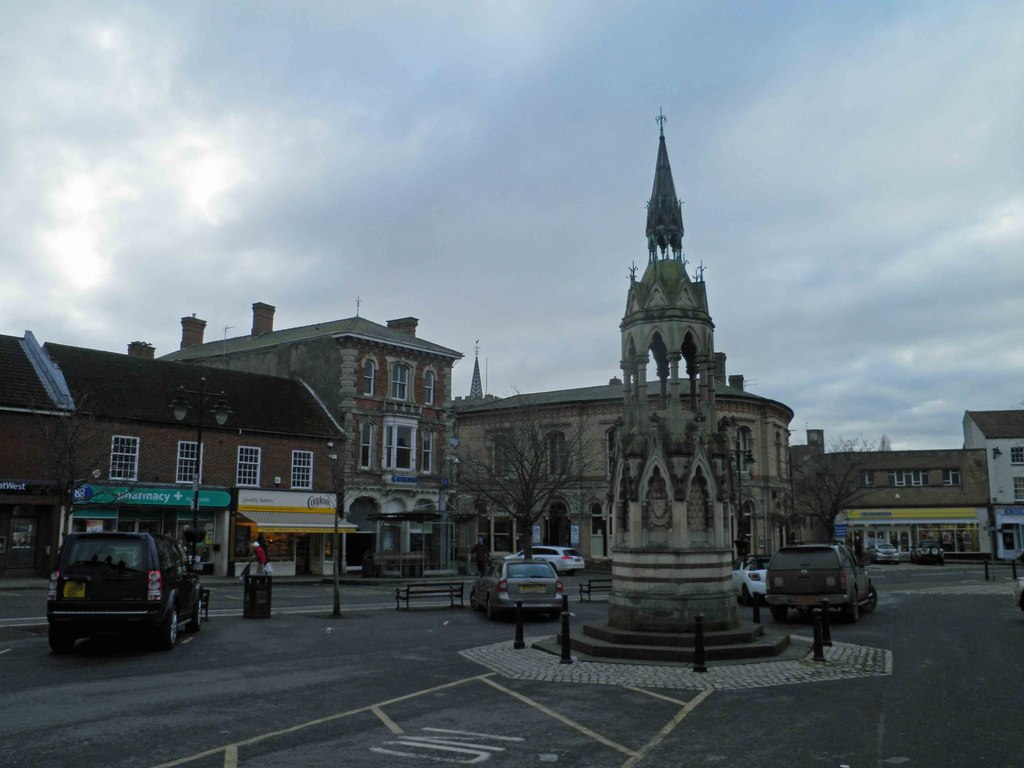
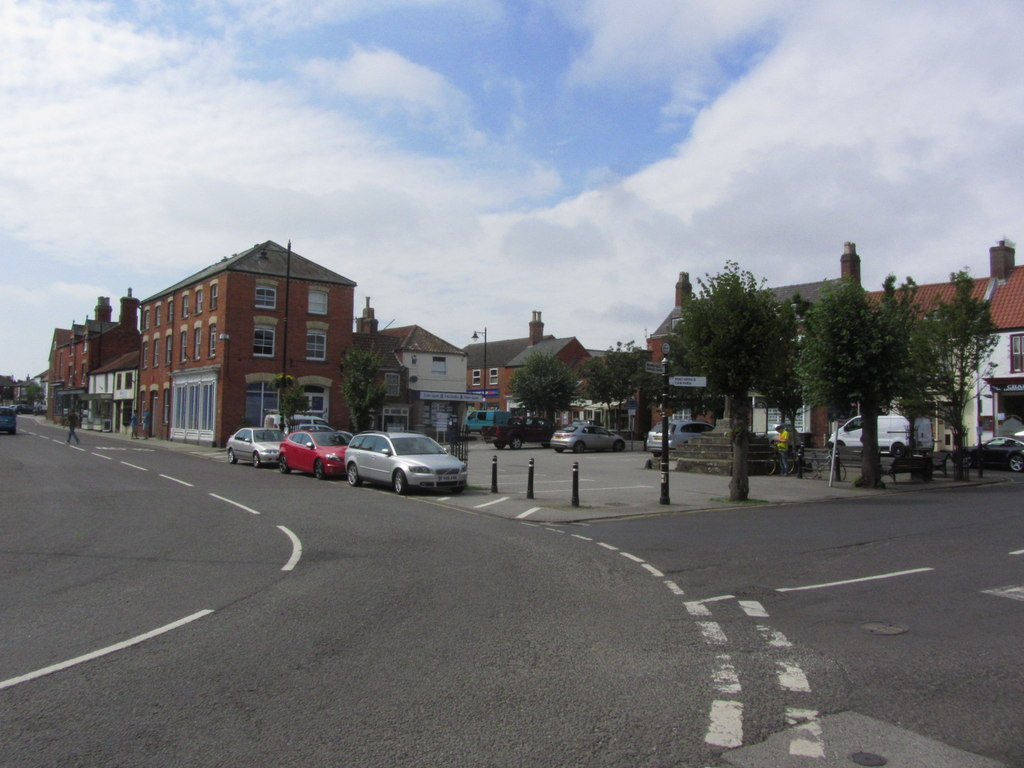
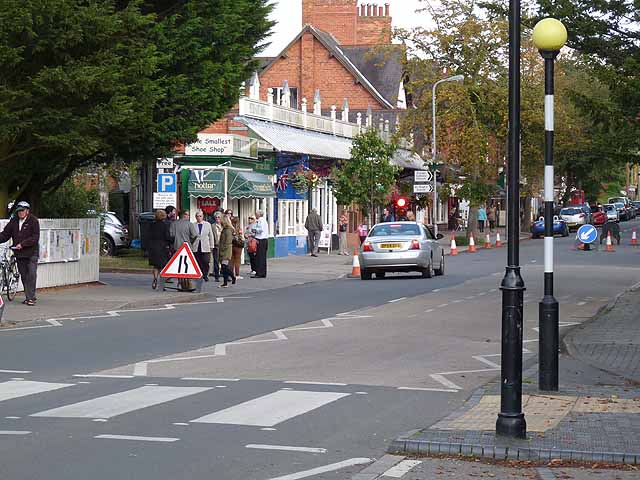
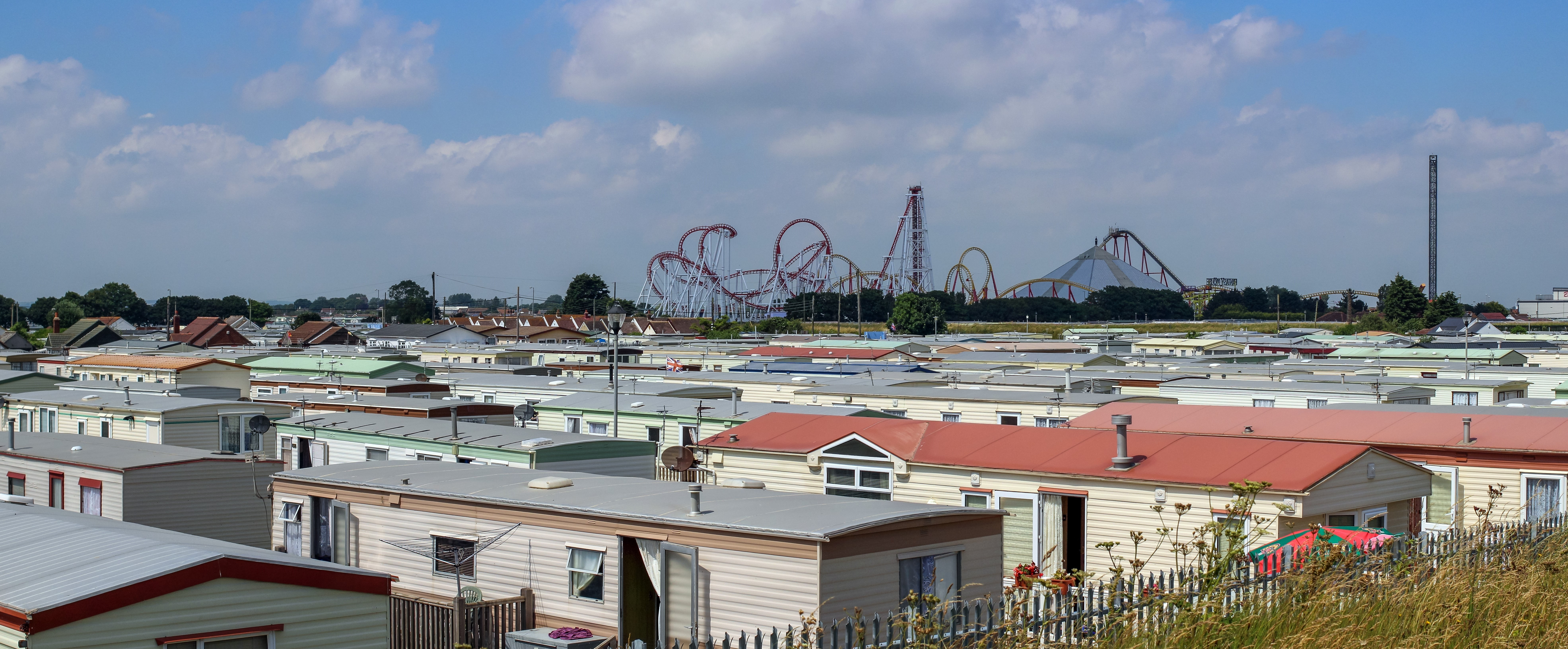
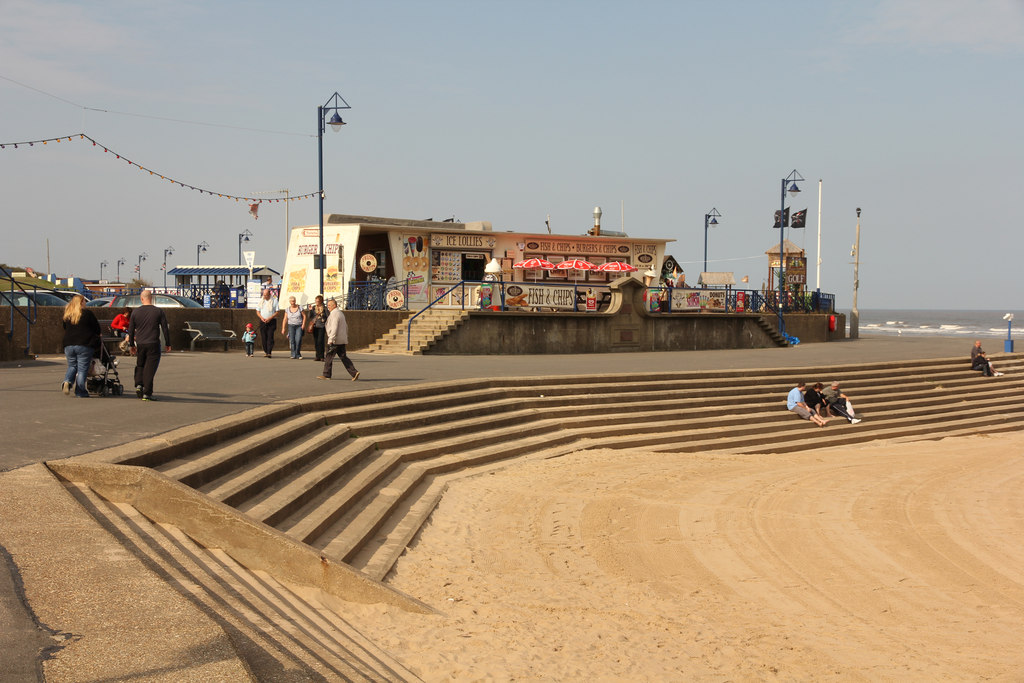
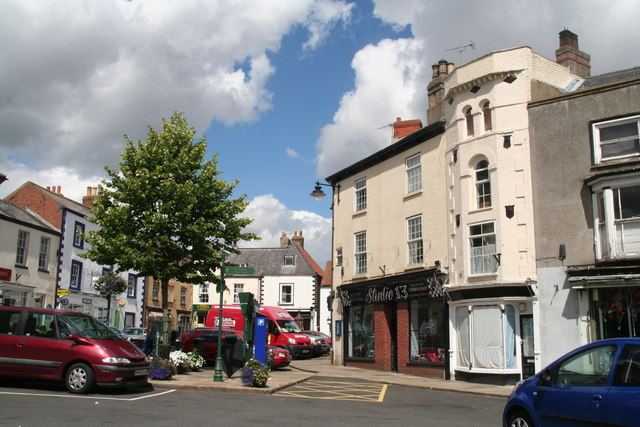
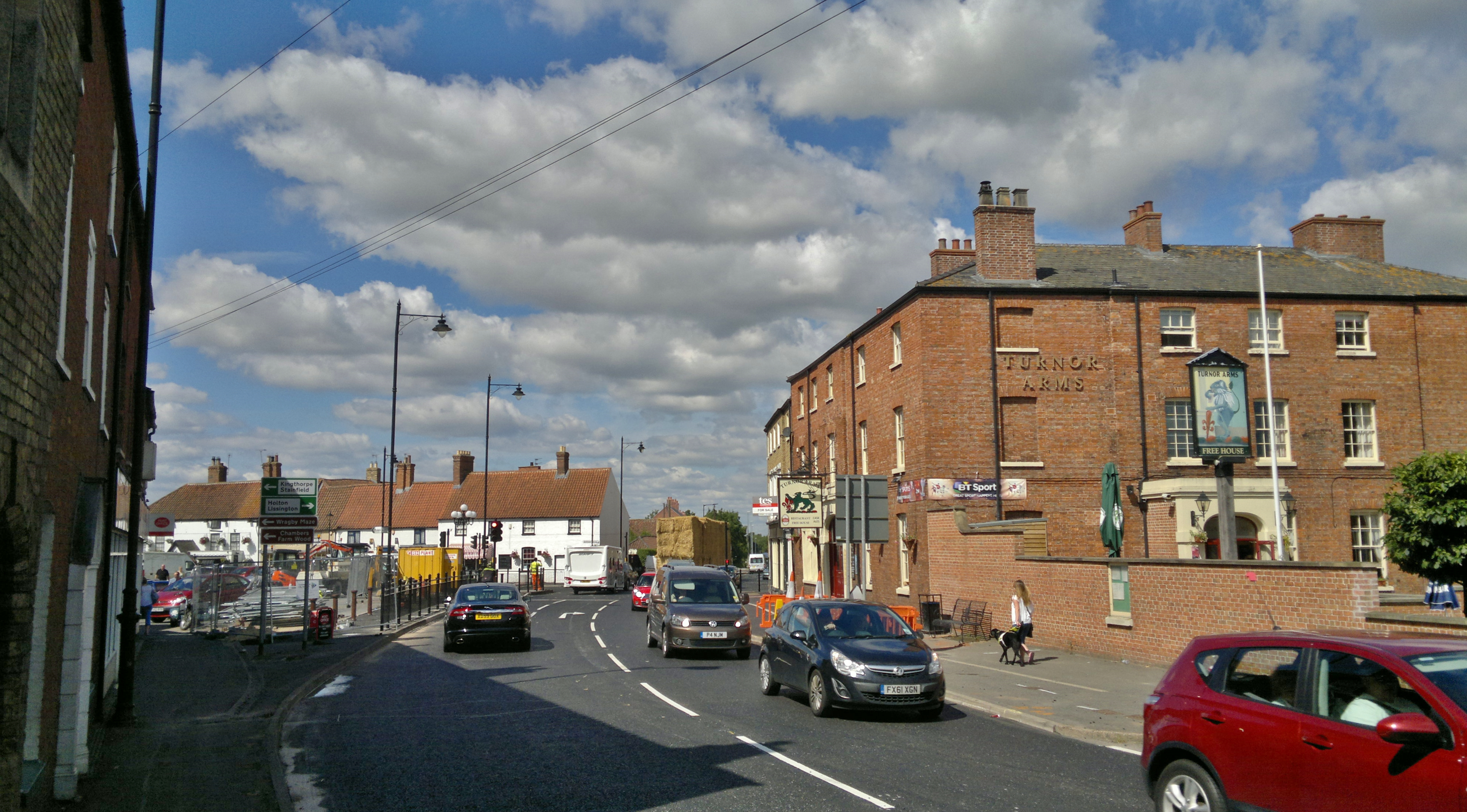
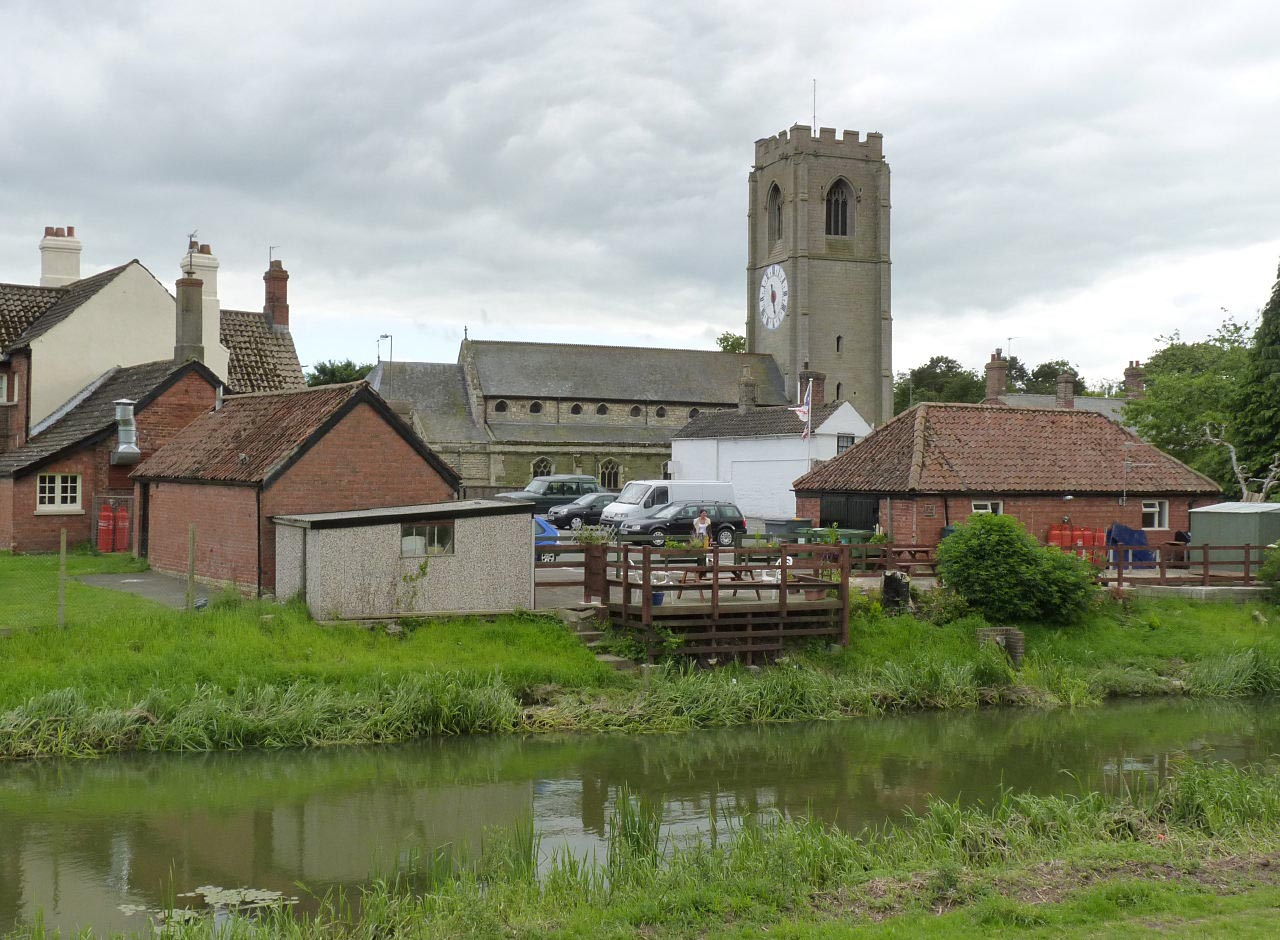
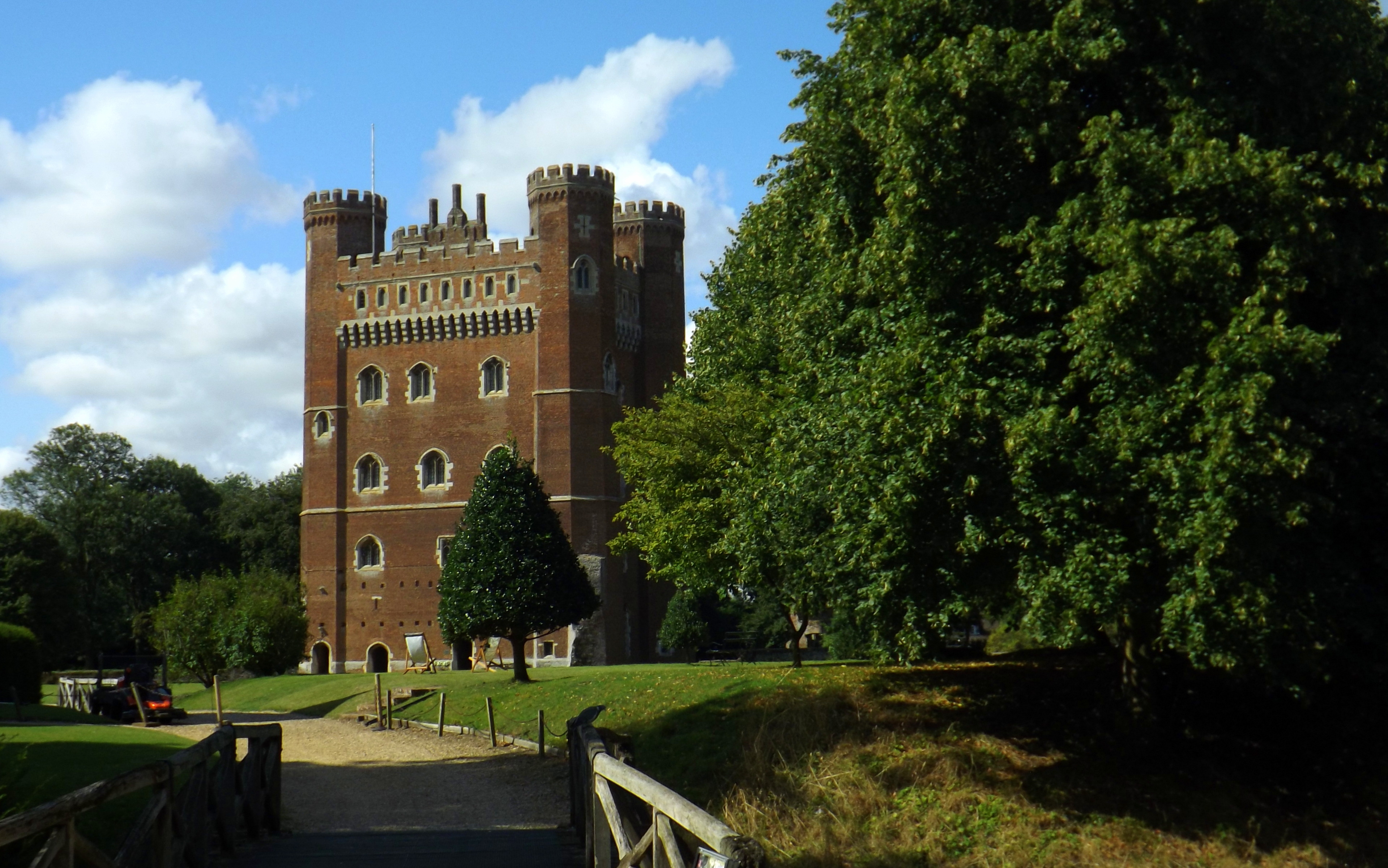
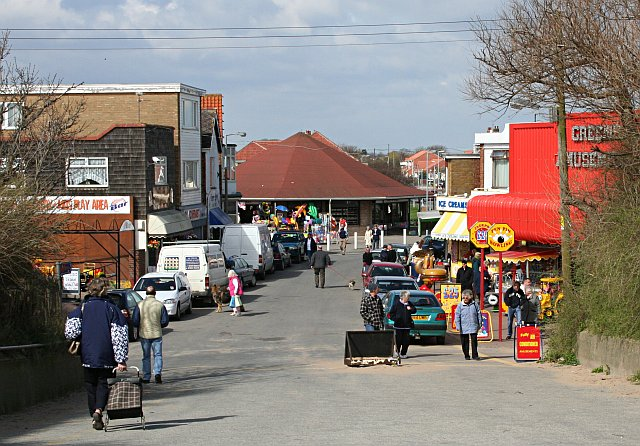
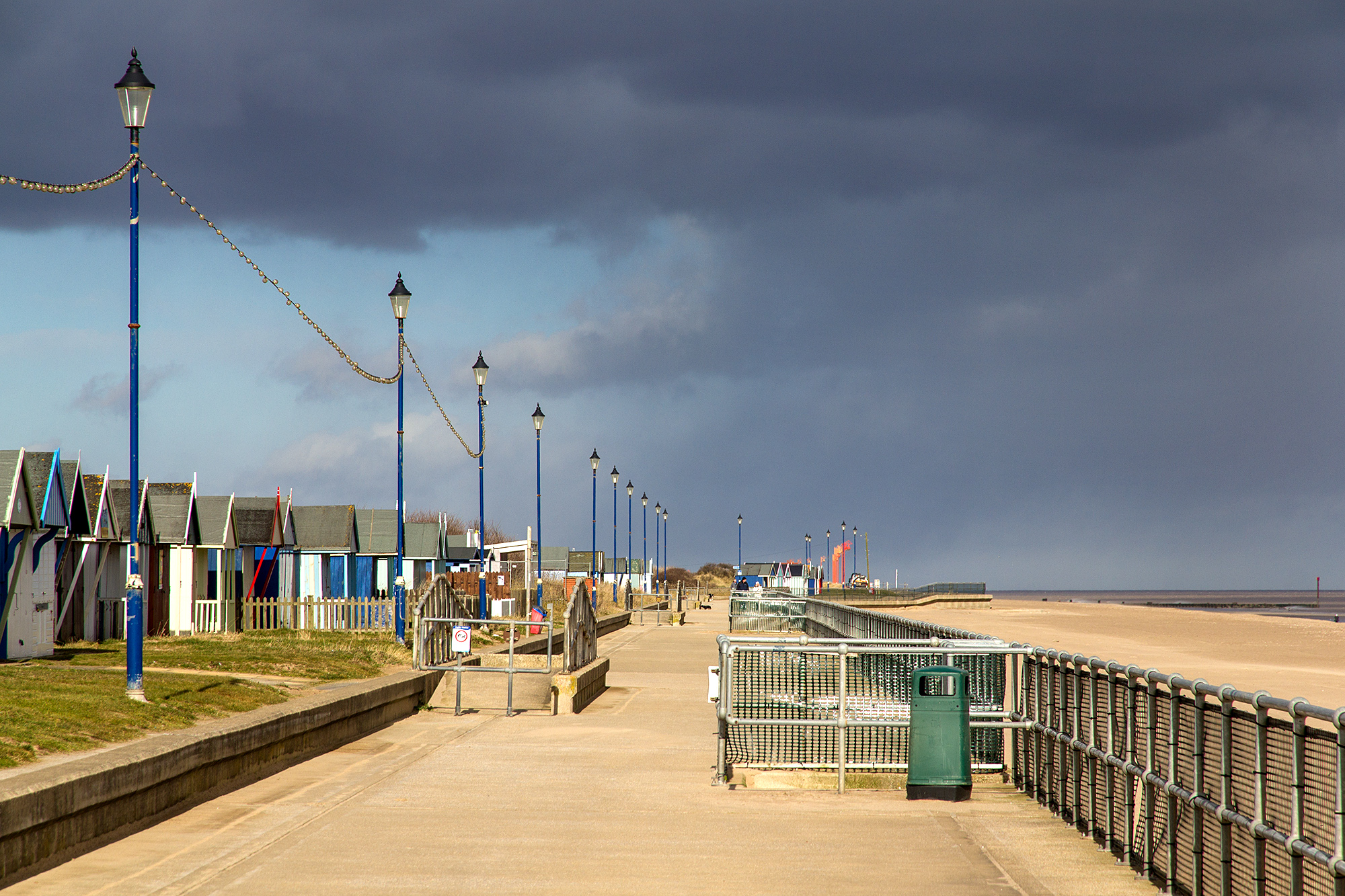
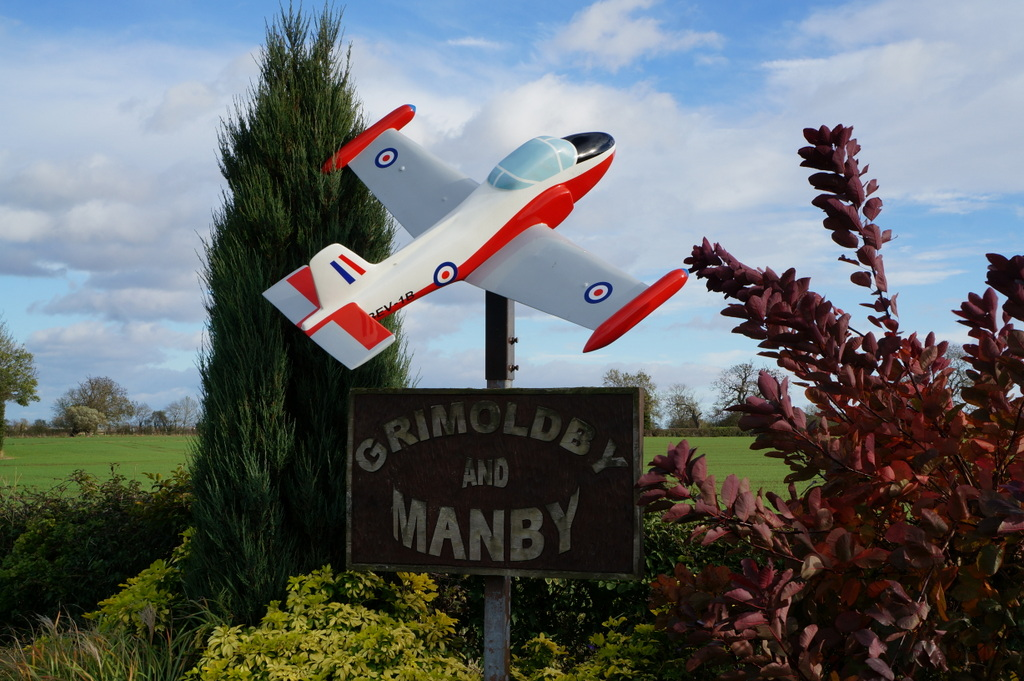
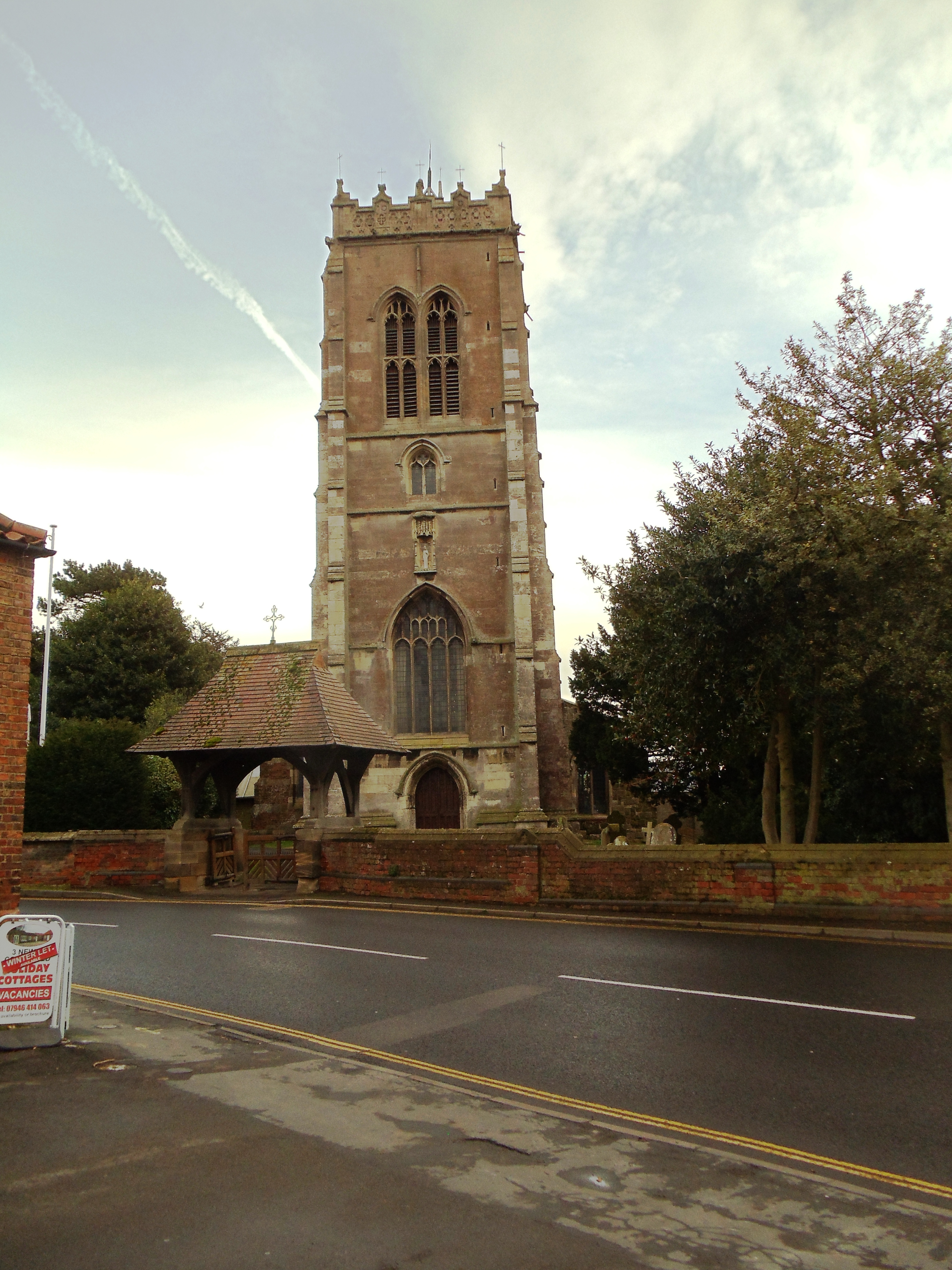
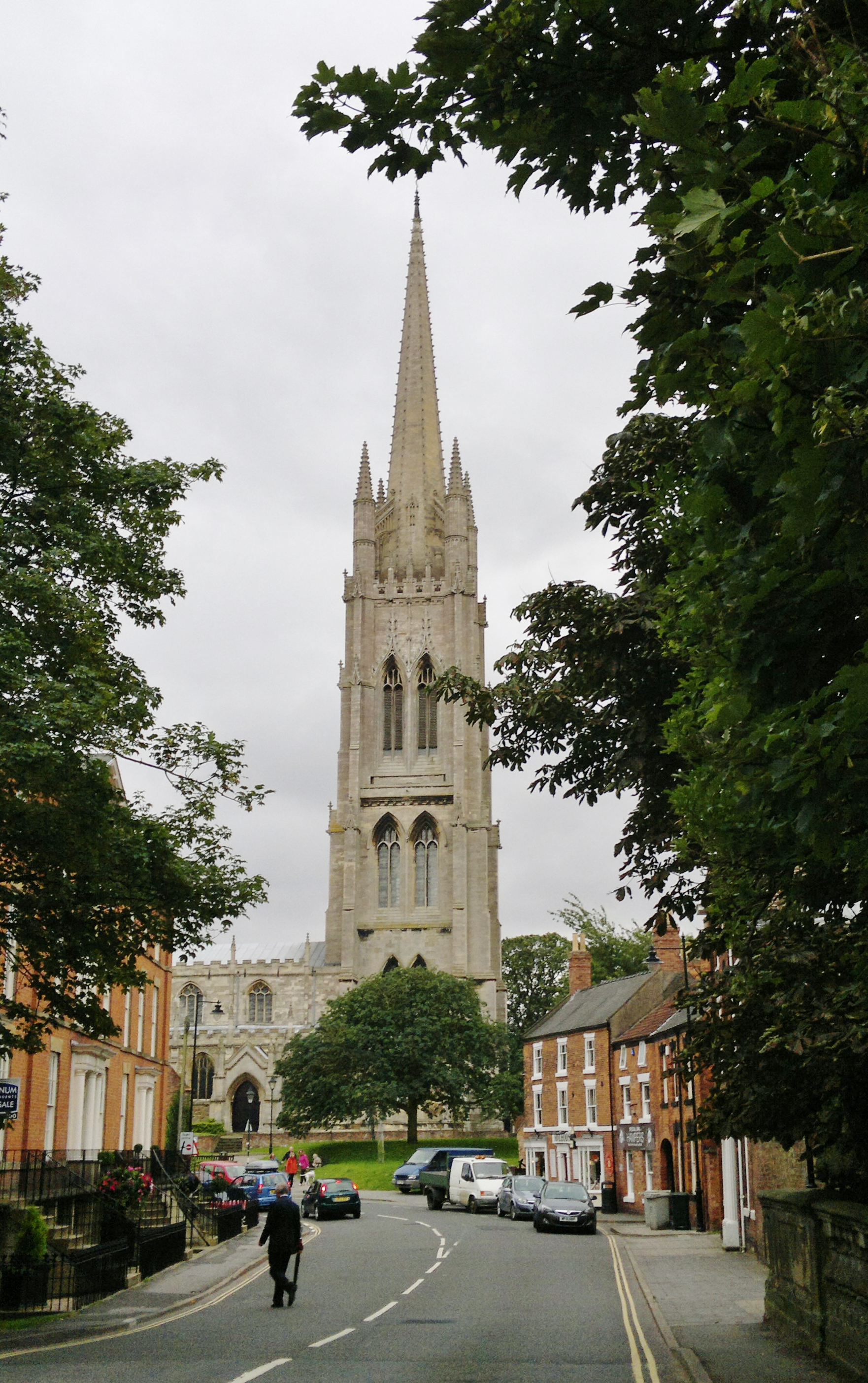
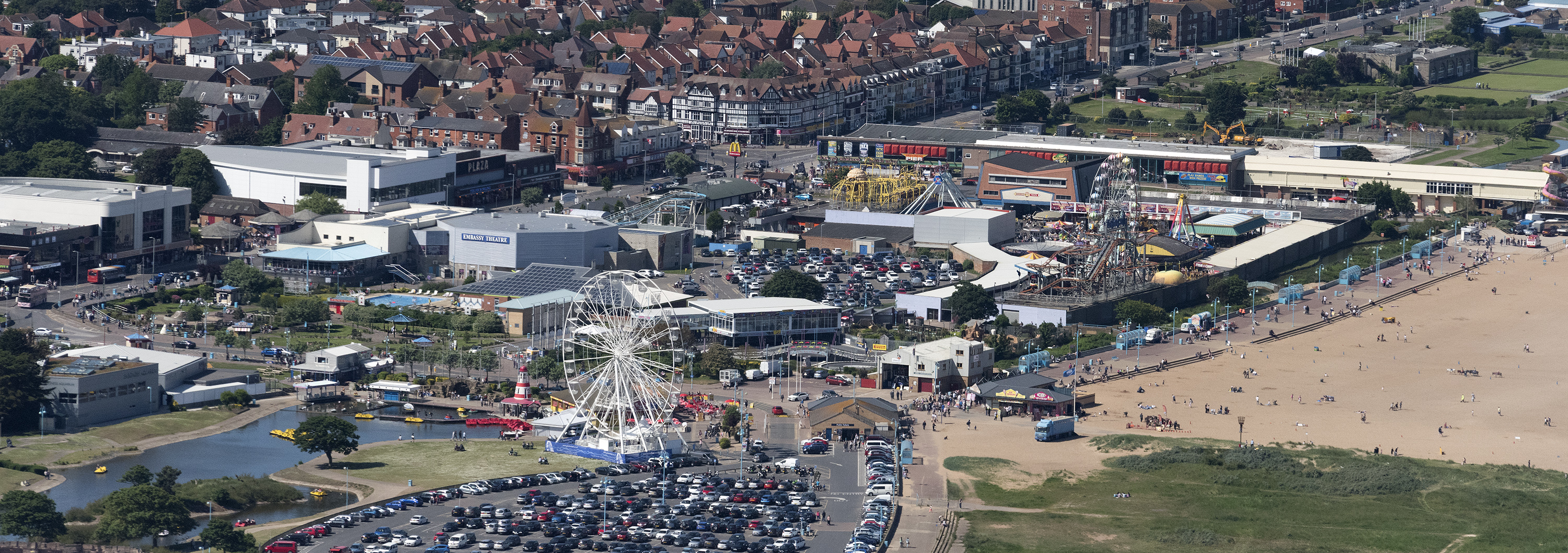
Notable Towns and Villages of East Lindsey

Landmarks from top left to bottom right:

1. Horncastle
2. Spilsby
3. Woodhall Spa
4. Ingoldmells
5. Mablethorpe
6. Alford
7. Wragby
8. Coningsby
9. Tattershall
10. Chapel St Leonards
11. Sutton-on-Sea
12. Grimoldby and Manby
13. Burgh le Marsh
14. Louth
15. Skegness

The economy in the district is divided between the coast and rural inland areas. The coastal towns of Mablethorpe and Skegness attract recreational and tourist traffic, and are characterised by a highly seasonal economy. The rural inland areas are dominated by agriculture.

== Transport ==
East Lindsey is highly rural and contains no dual carriageways. The A158 runs east–west from Lincoln, entering the district at Wragby, passing Horncastle and near by Spilsby, before terminating in Skegness. The A16 runs from Boston to the south, through Spilsby and Louth, and then on to Grimsby.

The district's only modern railway line is the Poacher Line in the south of the district, which connects Skegness to Nottingham via Boston and Grantham.

Historically the area was served by the East Lincolnshire Railway, which connected Boston to Grimsby via Alford and Louth. There were also spurs and branch lines, which included the Mablethorpe loop railway, Horncastle Railway and Spilsby branch. These connected small towns with the mainline and all closed between 1950 and 1970, with only the spur at Louth to Grimsby surviving until 1981. A section of the former East Lincolnshire Railway north of Louth has been restored as a heritage railway called the Lincolnshire Wolds Railway, centred on Ludborough station.

== Media ==
In terms of television, East Lindsey is served by BBC Yorkshire and Lincolnshire and ITV Yorkshire broadcasting from the Belmont transmitter.

Radio stations for the area are BBC Radio Lincolnshire, Lincs FM, Greatest Hits Radio Lincolnshire, and community based stations: County Linx Radio and Endeavour FM.

Lincolnshire Echo is the local newspaper.

== Towns and parishes ==
The whole district is divided into civil parishes. The parish councils for Alford, Burgh le Marsh, Carrington and New Bolingbroke, Coningsby, Horncastle, Louth, Mablethorpe and Sutton, Skegness, Spilsby and Wainfleet All Saints have declared their parishes to be towns, allowing them to take the style "town council". Many of the smaller parishes have a parish meeting rather than a parish council.

== See also ==
- Education in Lincolnshire
