= Urban district (England and Wales) =

Former type of local government area in England and Wales

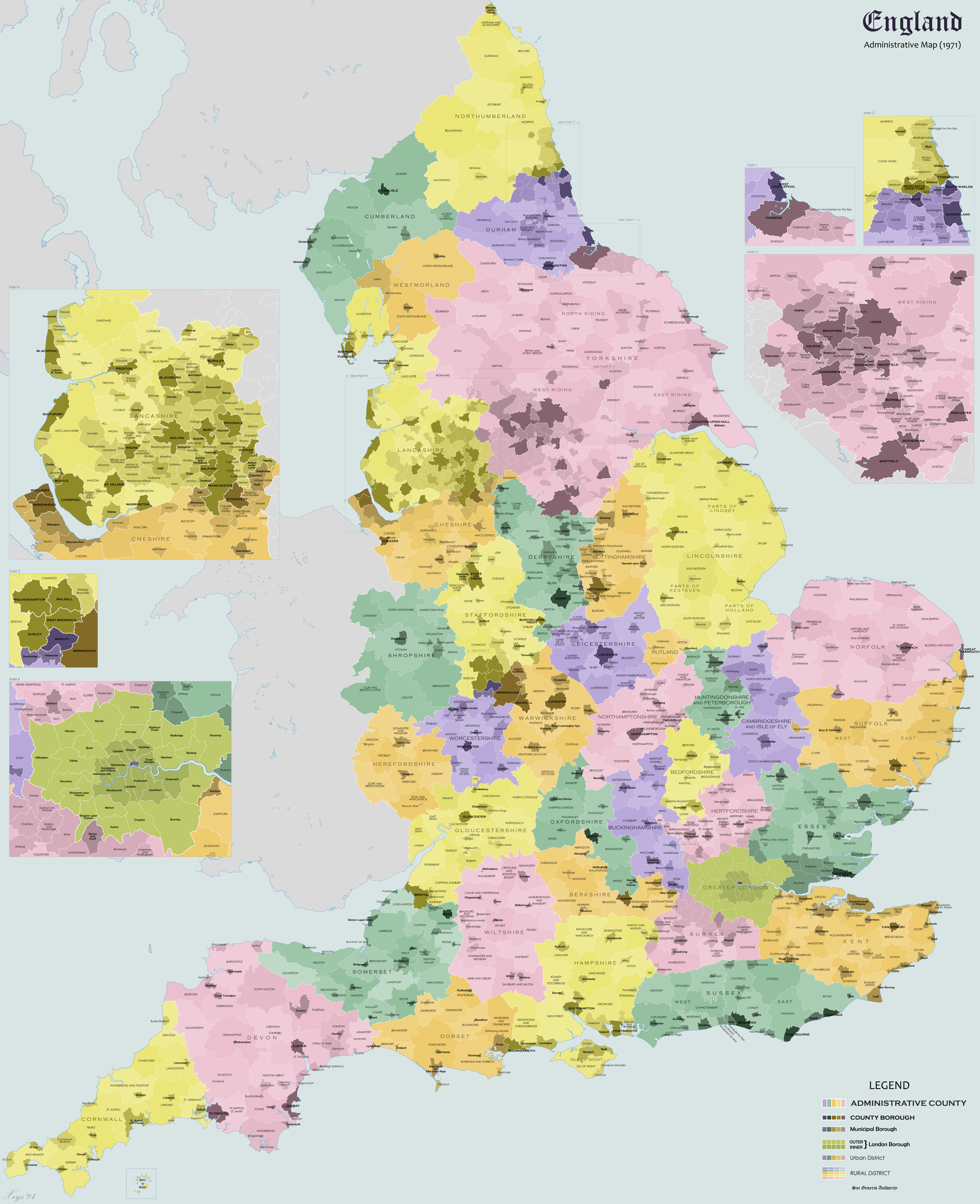
- Map of urban districts, administrative counties, county boroughs, municipal boroughs and rural districts in England in 1971. Urban districts are shown in normal (rather than bold or italic) type.
- Category: Local government district
- Location: England and Wales
- Found in: Administrative county
- Created by: Local Government Act 1894
- Created: 1894
- Abolished by: Local Government Act 1972
- Abolished: 1974
- Government: Urban district council

In England and Wales, an urban district was a type of local government district that covered an urbanised area. Urban districts had an elected urban district council (UDC), which shared local government responsibilities with a county council.

In England and Wales, urban districts and rural districts were created in 1894 by the Local Government Act 1894 (56 & 57 Vict. c. 73) as subdivisions of administrative counties. A similar model of urban and rural districts was also established in Ireland in 1899, which continued separately in Northern Ireland and the Republic of Ireland after 1921.

They replaced the earlier system of urban and rural sanitary districts (based on poor law unions) whose functions were taken over by the district councils. The district councils also had wider powers over local matters such as parks, cemeteries and local planning. An urban district usually contained a single parish, while a rural district might contain many. Urban districts were considered to have more problems with public health than rural areas, and so urban district councils had more funding and greater powers than comparable rural districts.

Urban districts normally covered smaller towns, usually with populations of fewer than 30,000. When the 1894 Act came into force on 31 December 1894 there had been 753 urban districts, of which 692 had previously been local government districts, 30 had been improvement commissioners districts and 31 were places newly given urban powers in 1894. The number of urban districts initially increased after 1894 as more places sought urban powers, but implementation of the recommendations of a series of county reviews as established by the Local Government Act 1929 saw a net decrease of 159 between 1932 and 1938. In many instances smaller urban districts were merged with their surrounding rural districts, with the result that new districts emerged covering rural as well as urban parishes. At the same time, a number of larger urban districts became municipal boroughs (as already created, in 1835 under the Municipal Corporations Act 1835): these had a slightly higher status and the right to appoint a mayor.

Urban districts in the outer London area were absorbed into London Boroughs in 1965 as a consequence of the London Government Act 1963. All remaining urban districts in England and Wales were abolished in 1974 by the Local Government Act 1972, and replaced with a uniform system of larger districts – see Districts of England and Districts of Wales – which often covered both urban and rural areas. Many parish councils in England were created for towns previously covered by urban districts and, as a result of subsequent legislation, all urban and rural areas in Wales are today covered by 870 communities as sub-entities of 22 unitary authorities (or principal areas).

== See also ==
- Small burgh (approximate equivalent in Scotland)
- Urban and rural districts (Ireland) (established in Ireland in 1899)
- List of urban districts formed in England and Wales 1894–95
- List of urban districts formed in England and Wales 1896–1974
- List of rural and urban districts in England in 1973
- List of rural and urban districts in Wales in 1973
