= Alistair =

- Pronunciation: /ˈælɪstər/ AL-ist-ər
- Gender: Male
- Language: English

Origin
- Language: Scottish Gaelic
- Origin: Alasdair

Other names
- Alternative spelling: Alister, Allister, Alyster, Alystair, Allystair, Allyster, Allaster, Alasdair, Alastair, Allistier, Alisdair
- Nicknames: Alis, Ally, Al

Alistair is a male given name. It is an Anglicised form of the Scottish Gaelic name Alasdair. The latter is most likely a Scottish Gaelic variant of the Norman name Alexandre or the Latin name Alexander, which was incorporated into English in the same form as Alexander. The deepest etymology is the Greek Ἀλέξανδρος (man-repeller): ἀλέξω (repel) + ἀνήρ (man), "the one who repels men", a warrior name. Another (much less common) Anglicisation of Alasdair is Allaster.

== People ==
=== Alastair ===
- Alastair Adams (born 1969), English artist
- Alastair Aiken (born 1993), British YouTuber
- Alastair Aird (1931–2009), British royal courtier
- Alastair Bellingham (1938–2017), British haematologist
- Alastair Biggar, (1946–2016) Scotland international rugby union player
- Alastair Bray (born 1993), Australian footballer
- Alastair Bruce of Crionaich (born 1960), British journalist, British Army reservist and officer of arms
- Alastair Burnet (1928 – 20 July 2012), British journalist and broadcaster
- Alastair Caldwell (born 1943), British-New Zealand motorsports manager
- Alastair Campbell (born 1957), Tony Blair's former director of communications
- Alastair Chalmers (born 2000), British track and field hurdler
- Alastair Clarkson (born 1968), head coach of Hawthorn Football Club
- Alastair Cook (born 1984), English cricketer
- Alastair Crooke (born 1949), British diplomat
- Alastair Denniston (1881–1961), Scottish codebreaker and hockey player
- Alastair Duncan, several people
- Alastair Dunnett (1908–1998), Scottish journalist and newspaper editor
- Alastair Fitter, (born 1948) British ecologist at the University of York
- Alastair Forsyth (born 1976), Scottish professional golfer
- Alastair Fothergill (born 1960), British film producer, best known for BBC nature documentaries
- Alastair Fowler (1930–2022), Scottish literary critic
- Alastair Galbraith, (born 1965) New Zealand musician and sound artist from Dunedin
- Alastair Gillespie (1922–2018), former Canadian politician who held several cabinet positions in the 1970s
- Alastair Goodlad (born 1943), British politician
- Alastair Greene (born 1971), American singer, guitarist, and songwriter
- Alastair Hannay (1932–2024), British-born Norwegian philosopher and academic
- Alastair Hignell (born 1955), English athlete and broadcaster
- Alastair Little (1950–2022), British chef, cookbook author and restaurateur
- Alastair Lynch (born 1968), Australian rules footballer
- Alastair Mackenzie (born 1970), Scottish actor most famous for playing Archie MacDonald in Monarch of the Glen
- Alastair Mackintosh, (born 1968), former New Zealand rower
- Alastair McDonald, several people
- Alastair McNeil, (1915–1944), Scottish international rugby union player
- Alastair Morgan (born 1958), British diplomat
- Alastair Morrison, several people
- Alastair Niven (1944–2025), English literary scholar and author
- Alastair Pilkington (1920–1995), British inventor, engineer, and businessman
- Alastair Redfern (born 1948), retired Church of England bishop
- Alastair Reid, several people
- Alastair Reynolds (born 1966), Welsh science fiction author
- Alastair Riddell (born 1952), New Zealand singer-songwriter
- Alastair Robinson (born 1980), Anglo-American field botanist
- Alastair Salvesen (1941–2024), British billionaire businessman and heir
- Alastair Scott, several people
- Alastair Sim (1900–1976), comedy actor
- Alastair Sooke (born 1981), English art critic and broadcaster
- Al Stewart (born 1945), Scottish singer-songwriter
- Alastair Stewart (born 1952), ITV News presenter
- Alastair Storey (born 1953), Scottish businessman
- Alastair Stout, British actor
- Alastair Taylor, several people
- Alastair Windsor, 2nd Duke of Connaught and Strathearn (1914–1943), a great-grandson of Queen Victoria

=== Alistair ===
- Alistair Abell, Canadian voice actor
- Alistair Appleton (born 1970), television presenter
- Alistair Begg (born 1950), American pastor, author, and speaker
- Alistair Brammer (born 1988), English actor
- Alistair Brownlee (born 1988), British triathlete and Olympic gold medalist
- Alistair Bunkall (born 1982), British journalist
- Alistair Campbell (born 1972), Zimbabwean cricketer
- Alistair Carmichael (born 1965), British politician
- Alistair Carns (born 1980), British politician and Royal Marines officer
- Alistair Cragg (born 1980), South African track and field athlete
- Alistair Cooke (1908–2004), journalist and broadcaster
- Alistair Darling (1953–2023), British politician
- Alistair Edwards (born 1968), Australian football player and coach
- Alistair Fruish, English filmmaker, writer and novelist
- Alistair Hargreaves, South African rugby player
- Alistair Hinton (born 1950), Scottish composer
- Alistair Knox (1912–1986), Australian designer, builder and landscape architect
- Alistair MacLean (1922–1987), Scottish novelist
- Alistair MacLeod (1936–2014), Canadian novelist, short story writer and academic
- Alistair McGowan (born 1964), English impressionist and comedian
- Alistair McGregor (born 1981), Scottish field hockey goalkeeper
- Alistair Overeem (born 1980), Dutch mixed martial arts fighter
- Alistair Petrie (born 1970), British actor
- Alistair Sinclair (born 1960), computer scientist
- Alistair Strathern (born 1990), British politician
- Alistair Taylor (1935–2004), personal assistant to the Beatles' manager Brian Epstein
- Alistair Urquhart (1919–2016), Scottish businessman and author
- Ally MacLeod (1931–2004) Scottish footballer and national team manager
- Ally McCoist (born 1962), Scottish footballer

=== Allister ===
- Allister Adel (1976–2022), American district attorney
- Allister Bain (1935–2026), Grenadian actor, playwright and screenwriter
- Allister Brimble, British video game composer
- Allister Carter (born 1979), English snooker player
- Allister Coetzee (born 1963), South African rugby union coach and former player
- Allister de Winter (born 1968), Australian retired cricketer
- Allister Grosart (1906–1984), Canadian politician
- Allister Heath (born 1978), British business journalist and commentator
- Ally Hogg (born 1983), Scottish rugby union footballer
- Allister MacGillivray (born 1948), Canadian singer/songwriter, guitarist and music historian
- Allister Miller (1892–1951), South African aviation pioneer, First World War pilot, politician and entrepreneur
- Allister Sparks (1933–2016), South African writer
- Allister Surette (born 1961), Canadian politician
- Allister Whitehead (born 1969 or 1970), British DJ, musician, remixer and record producer

=== Alister ===
- Alister Allan (born 1944), Scottish rifleman
- Alister Campbell (born 1959), Scottish rugby union player
- Alister Charlie (born 1977 or 1978), Guyanese politician
- Alister Clark (1864–1949), Australian rose breeder
- Alister Fraser Gordon (1872–1917), British general
- Alister Hardy (1896–1985), English marine biologist
- Alister Howden (1877–1938), New Zealand cricketer
- Alister Jack (born 1963), Scottish politician
- Alister MacKenzie (1870–1934), British golf course designer
- Alister McDermott (born 1991), Australian cricketer
- Alister McGrath (born 1953), Northern Irish theologian, priest, intellectual historian, scientist and Christian apologist
- Alister Watson (1908–1982), British mathematician

=== Aleister ===
- Aleister Black (born 1985), Dutch professional wrestler
- Aleister Crowley (1875–1947), British occultist

== Pseudonym ==
- Alastair (artist), pseudonym of Hans Henning Otto Harry Baron von Voigt, a German artist

== In fiction ==
- Alastair, a demon on the television series Supernatural
- Alistair Theirin, a character from the Dragon Age video game series
- Brigadier Sir Alistair Gordon Lethbridge-Stewart, Brigadier of UNIT on British science fiction show Doctor Who
- Alistaire Stuart, an ally of Excalibur in Marvel Comics
- Alistair Scott, a fictional wheelchair-using student appearing in the British sitcom, The Inbetweeners
- Alistair Smythe, a Spider-Man villain
- Alistair Crane, a villainous patriarch and businessman on TV's Passions
- Alistair Oh, the Uncle from the 39 Clues series
- Ser Alliser Thorne, master-of-arms in the Night's Watch in the A Song of Ice and Fire book series and Game of Thrones television series

== Other use ==
- Cyclone Alistair, a moderate tropical cyclone that existed near Australia in April 2001.

== See also ==
- Alastar
- Alastor
- Allaster
- Allister
- Macalester
- Macalister
- McAlister
- McAllester
- McAllister (surname)
