= Alasdair =

- Pronunciation: [ˈal̪ˠəs̪t̪ɪɾʲ]
- Gender: Male
- Language: Scottish Gaelic

Origin
- Meaning: Scottish Gaelic form of Alexander, meaning "defender of man"

Other names
- See also: Alexander, Alistair, Alastair, Alaster, Alister, Alisdair

Alasdair (pronounced [ˈal̪ˠəs̪t̪ɪɾʲ]) is a Scottish Gaelic given name. The name is a Gaelic form of Alexander which has long been a popular name in Scotland. The personal name Alasdair is often Anglicised as Alistair, Alastair, and Alaster.

== People named Alasdair ==
- Alexander of Argyll (died 1310), Scottish magnate
- Alasdair Allan (born 1971), Scottish politician
- Alasdair Beckett-King (born 1984), English stand-up comedian
- Alasdair Boyle (born 1945), Scottish rugby union player
- Alasdair Breckenridge (1937–2019), Scottish pharmacologist
- Alasdair Caimbeul (born 1941), Scottish playwright, short story writer, and novelist
- Alasdair Clayre (1935–1984), British author and broadcaster
- Alasdair Cochrane (born 1978), British political theorist and ethicist
- Alasdair Dickinson (born 1983), Scottish rugby union coach
- Alasdair Drysdale (born 1950), Scottish-American geographer and professor
- Alasdair Duncan (born 1982), Australian author and journalist
- Alasdair Elliott, British operatic tenor
- Alasdair Evans (born 1989), English-Scottish cricketer
- Alasdair Fotheringham, British journalist
- Alasdair Fraser (1946–2012), Scottish-Irish lawyer
- Alasdair Fraser (born 1955), Scottish fiddler, composer, performer, and recording artist
- Alasdair Garnsworthy (born 1983), English cricketer
- Alasdair Macintosh Geddes (born 1934), Scottish professor
- Alasdair Gillies (1963–2011), Scottish bagpiper and tutor
- Alasdair Gillis, Canadian television host
- Alasdair Graham (1929–2015), Canadian politician, journalist, and businessman
- Alasdair Graham (1934–2016), Scottish pianist, accompanist, and academic
- Alasdair Gray (1934–2019), Scottish writer and artist
- Alasdair Hay (born 1961), British firefighter
- Alasdair Houston, English evolutionary biologist and ecologist
- Alasdair Hutton (born 1940), British writer and narrator
- Alasdair Kent, British-Australian opera singer
- Alasdair Liddell (1949–2012), British health service administrator
- Alasdair Locke, Scottish businessman
- Alasdair Mac Colla (c. 1610–1647), 17th-century military officer
- Alasdair Alpin MacGregor (1899–1970), Scottish writer and photographer
- Alasdair MacGriogair (1806–1881), Scottish writer and minister
- Alasdair MacIlleBhàin (born 1987), Scottish singer-songwriter
- Alasdair MacIntyre (1929–2025), Scottish-American philosopher
- Alasdair Mackenzie (1903–1970), Scottish farmer and politician
- Alasdair Maclay (born 1973), English cricketer
- Alasdair MacLean, English singer and guitarist
- Alasdair Maclean (1926–1994), Scottish poet and writer
- Alasdair MacLennan (born 1957), Scottish cyclist and sporting administrator
- Alasdair Crotach MacLeod (1450–1547), Scottish Chief
- Alasdair MacMhaighstir Alasdair, Scottish war poet and satirist
- Alasdair McDonnell (born 1949), Irish politician
- Alasdair McLellan (born 1974), British photographer
- Alasdair Middleton, British opera singer and playwright
- Alasdair Mitchell (born 1950), British conductor
- Alasdair Milne (1930–2013), British TV producer
- Alasdair Monk (born 1972), English football goalkeeper
- Alasdair Mór, Scottish Gael
- Alasdair Morgan (born 1945), Scottish politician
- Alasdair Morrison (born 1968), Scottish politician
- Alasdair Morrison, Scottish banker
- Alasdair Paterson, Scottish poet and academic librarian
- Alasdair Pollock (born 1993), English cricketer
- Alasdair Roberts (born 1961), Canadian academic
- Alasdair Roberts (born 1977), Scottish folk musician
- Alasdair Smith (born 1949), Scottish international economist
- Alasdair Steedman (1922–1992), English Royal Air Force senior commander
- Alasdair Steele-Bodger (1924–2008), British veterinary surgeon
- Alasdair Strokosch (born 1983), Scottish rugby union player
- Alasdair Tait, Scottish cellist, teacher, and artistic director
- Alasdair Tayler (1870–1937), British historical writer
- Alasdair Taylor (born 1965), Scottish squash player
- Alasdair Grant Taylor (1934–2007), Scottish artist and sculptor
- Alasdair Turner (1969–2011), British scientist
- Alasdair Urquhart (born 1945), Scottish philosopher and professor
- Alasdair Walker (1956–2019), British medical doctor and Royal Navy officer
- Alasdair Mackie Ward, known as Algy Ward (1959–2023), British musician
- Alasdair Webster (born 1934), Australian politician
- Alasdair White (born 1983), Scottish folk musician
- Alasdair A. K. White (born 1952), British management theorist
- Alasdair Whittle (born 1949), British archaeologist and academic

== Fictional characters ==
- Alasdair Sinclair, Emmerdale character played by Ray Coulthard

== See also ==
- Sgurr Alasdair, the highest peak on the Isle of Skye
