= Alex Taylor =

Alex or Alexander or Alexandra Taylor may refer to:

== People ==
=== Actors and theatrical professionals ===
- Alex Taylor, stage name used by pornographic actress Adriana Molinari (born 1970)
- Alex Cole Taylor, acting teacher

=== Businesspeople ===
- Alex Taylor (businessman) (1853–1916), Canadian entrepreneur, inventor and politician
- Alexander C. Taylor, American businessman, CEO of Cox Enterprises

=== Politicians ===
- Alex Taylor (Australian politician) (1906–1976), Australian politician
- Alex Taylor (Canadian politician) (born 1936), Canadian politician
- Alexander Donald Taylor (1928–2023), Australian politician
- Alexander W. Taylor (1815–1893), US Representative from Pennsylvania

=== Sportspeople ===
- Alex Taylor (American football) (born 1997), American football player
- Alex Taylor (footballer) (born 1962), Scottish footballer
- Alex Taylor (rugby union) (born 1990), New Zealand rugby union player
- Alexandra Taylor (born 1994), Cypriot alpine skier
- Alex Taylor (American runner) (born 1980), distance runner

=== Other people ===
- Alex Taylor (British Army officer) (born 1970), British Army major general
- Alex Taylor (singer) (1947–1993), American singer, brother of James Taylor
- Alex Taylor (composer) (born 1988), New Zealand composer, poet and writer
- Alexander Taylor (physician) (1802–1879), Scottish physician active in France
- Alexander Burt Taylor (1904–1972), Registrar General for Scotland
- Alexander Smith Taylor (1817–1876), American author and historian of California
- Deaths linked to chatbots § Police killing of Alex Taylor

== Characters ==
- Alex Taylor, a character in American TV series Third Watch

== See also ==
- Alec Tayler (1892–1964), Australian rules footballer
- Alexis Taylor (born 1980), British musician
- Alastair Taylor (disambiguation)
- Taylor (disambiguation)
