= Sutton-on-Sea =

Village in the East Lindsey district, Lincolnshire, England

Coordinates: 53.311245°N 0.280105°E

- Village
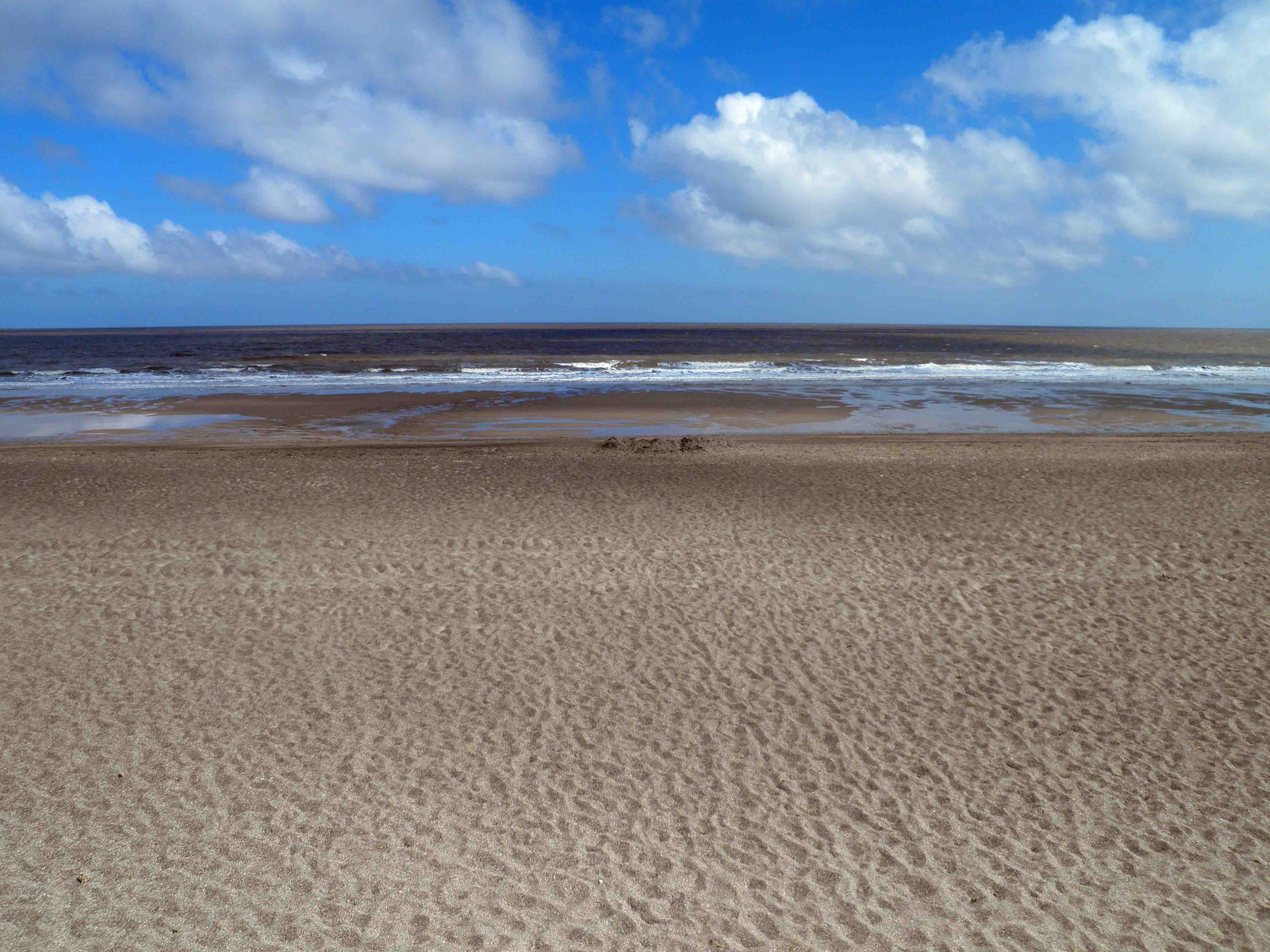
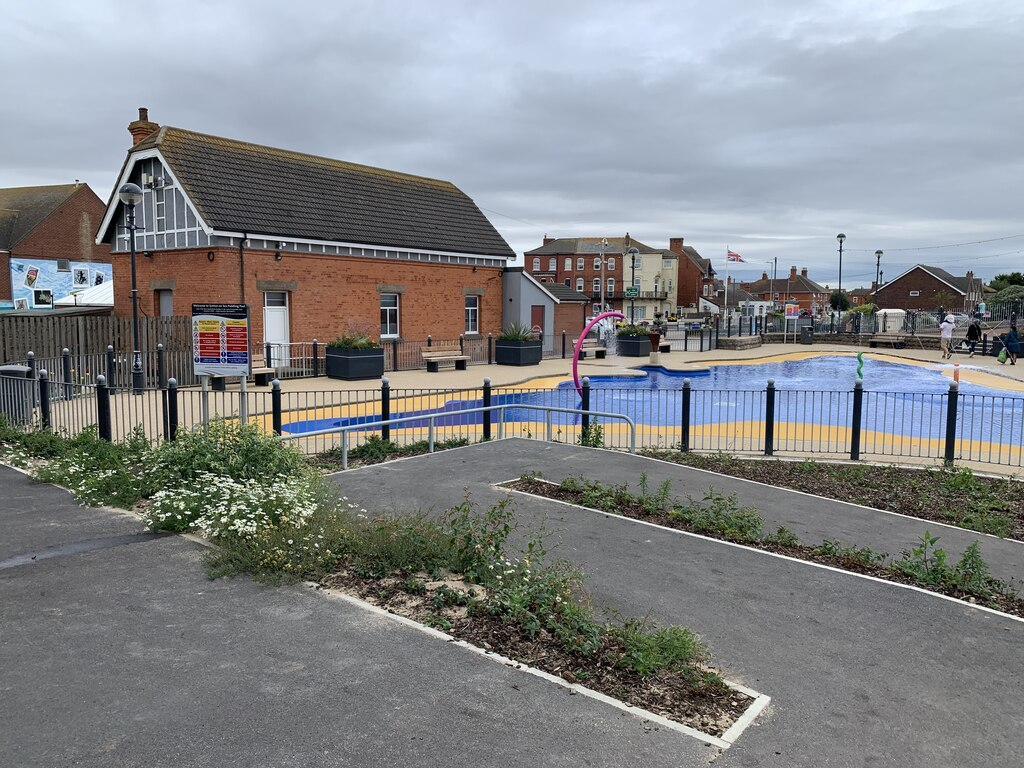
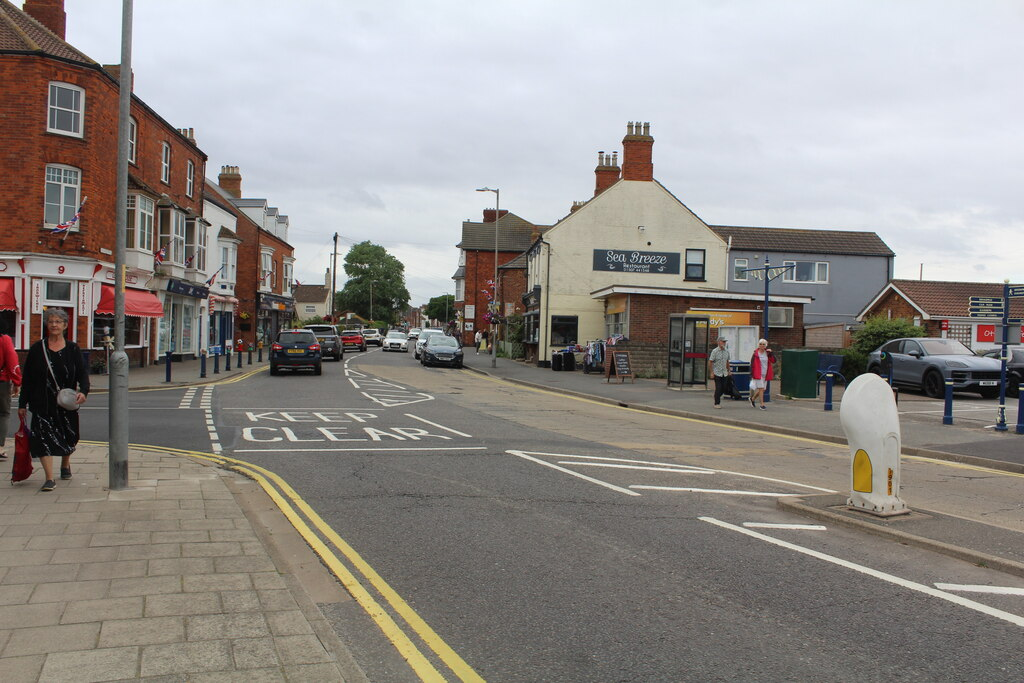
- The Beach Meridale Centre High Street

- Location within Lincolnshire
- OS grid reference: TF520817
  - London: 125 mi (201 km) S
- Civil parish: Mablethorpe and Sutton
- District: East Lindsey
- Shire county: Lincolnshire
- Region: East Midlands
- Country: England
- Sovereign state: United Kingdom
- Post town: Mablethorpe
- Postcode district: LN12
- Dialling code: 01507
- Police: Lincolnshire
- Fire: Lincolnshire
- Ambulance: East Midlands
- UK Parliament: Louth and Horncastle

Sutton-on-Sea (originally Sutton in the Marsh or Sutton le Marsh) is a small seaside town in the civil parish of Mablethorpe and Sutton, in the East Lindsey district of Lincolnshire, England, beside a long sandy beach along the Lincolnshire Coast and North Sea. The southern part of the town is known as Sandilands and nearby is also Trusthorpe. The town holds an outdoor market every Monday during summer months.

== History ==
At very low tides it is possible to view the remains of an ancient mixed forest on the beaches of Mablethorpe and Sutton on Sea. It was submerged by rising sea levels about 3000 years ago. The first scholar to publish an analysis of this submarine forest – and of any submarine forest – was the Portuguese botanist and polymath, José Francisco Correia da Serra, who surveyed it in 1796, when he visited the area in the company of the distinguished naturalist Sir Joseph Banks.

Sea flooding was a periodic problem during the Middle Ages. The last flood was the North Sea flood of January 1953, when a ten-foot storm surge broke through the flood defences.

The parish church St Clement's Church is a Grade II listed building, dedicated to Saint Clement. It was built in 1818–19 on a new site, after the previous church was destroyed by the sea.

In 1961 the civil parish of Sutton in the Marsh had a population of 1341. On 1 April 1974 the parish was abolished to form "Mablethorpe and Sutton".

== Railway influence ==
The Alford and Sutton Tramway ran from Alford to Sutton-on-Sea on rails set into the road. It opened in 1884 and closed five years later.

Sutton-on-Sea railway station opened as part of the Sutton and Willoughby Railway in 1886, which connected the village southwards, enabling through holiday trains from the industrial Midlands and North of England to reach the resort. In 1888 the line was extended to Mablethorpe. The railway connection encouraged development in Sutton; between July and December 1889 40,328 passengers were carried to Sutton, 1,700 more than to Mablethorpe in the same period.

The railway stations and line in the village closed on 5 October 1970.

== Harbour plans ==
Sutton le Marsh (as it was then called) was considered to be an ideal location for a new fishing harbour. The Sutton & Willoughby Railway & Dock Company was authorised by Parliament on 28 July 1884 to build docks at Sutton, and to make a railway branch line to the main line at Willoughby. Authorised share capital was £60,000. The company was unable to raise the capital it needed, and it built only the railway line and not the dock.

In December 1886 a fresh concern, the North Sea Fisheries Harbour & Dock Company promoted the scheme again, and it asked the Great Northern Railway for financial assistance. The GNR was the dominant network in the area, and at that time rail conveyance of fresh fish to the centres of population was good business for railway companies. Grimsby was well served by a rival railway company, the Manchester, Sheffield and Lincolnshire Railway and the North Sea Fisheries company hoped that the GNR would fund the construction. However the GNR saw that the dock expenditure would be very heavy, and would not pay, and it refused.

Port proposed by the Lancashire, Derbyshire and East Coast Railway

The idea of a new harbour was revived in 1891, when the Lancashire, Derbyshire and East Coast Railway was authorised to build a railway line across the country to Sutton. Sutton was preferred to Boston, which was also considered, because land was available at Sutton, and Trinity House said that Sutton was the best site for a port of refuge on that coast. This was a huge project, and once again the company was unable to raise the money it needed; it built a small portion of the planned railway, and did not start the harbour works. Eventually the company became owned by the Great Central Railway, which developed Immingham Docks from 1906.

== Education ==
Sutton on Sea Community Primary School was built in 1862 as a National School, becoming a board school in 1887, and a council school in 1903. It became a primary school in 1964, and has been called the Sutton on Sea Community Primary School since 1999.

== Media ==
Local news and television programmes are provided by BBC Yorkshire and Lincolnshire and ITV Yorkshire. Television signals are received from the Belmont TV transmitter. Local radio stations are BBC Radio Lincolnshire, Greatest Hits Radio Lincolnshire, Hits Radio Lincolnshire and Coastal FM, a community based station. The village is served by the local newspaper, Mablethorpe & Sutton Leader which publishes Wednesdays.

== Demography ==
When the 2011 census was taken, Sutton on Sea had two electoral wards, North and South. The south ward ranked, out of all 8570 nationwide, second by proportion of retirees in the total population, and the north ward ranked sixth. Between these, ranking third, was neighbouring Trusthorpe and Mablethorpe South, since which time the ward has been redrawn as Mablethorpe). The proportion on average, nationally was 15.6%; in the three wards mentioned the proportions respectively were: 45.5% retired, 41.1% retired and 42.1% retired.
