= Thomas Fitzwilliam =

English politician (died 1497)

Sir Thomas Fitzwilliam MP
- Born: circa 1430
- Died: 4 March 1497; Lincolnshire, England
- Burial place: St Mary's Church, Mablethorpe, Lincolnshire, England
- Education: Inner Temple
- Occupations: Speaker of the House of Commons, Recorder of London and Recorder of Lincoln
- Spouse: Margaret Harrington (m.???)
- Children: John Fitzwilliam, George Fitzwilliam, and William Fitzwilliam

Sir Thomas Fitzwilliam MP (died 4 March 1497) was Speaker of the House of Commons of England in 1489–1490.

He was born into a longstanding Lincolnshire gentry family, the son of Thomas Fitzwilliam of Mablethorpe and educated at the Inner Temple.

He was appointed Recorder of Lincoln and elected MP for Lincoln in 1459. In 1467 he was returned as MP for Plympton Earle, then a seat under the control of the Crown. In 1478 he was appointed a serjeant-at-law for the Duchy of Lancaster.

After obtaining a house in Stepney, he was elected a Recorder of London and supported the claim of Richard III to the English throne. He nevertheless welcomed Henry Tudor after the Battle of Bosworth and became more active in government, representing London in King Henry's first parliament. He was knighted in 1486.

In 1489, in Henry's third Parliament, he was elected Speaker of the House, electing to sit as knight of the shire for Lincolnshire.

He died in 1497 – his remains are thought to be located in St Mary's Church, Mablethorpe. He was married to Margaret Harrington (d. 1498), daughter of Sir James Harrington, with whom he had at least three sons, John Fitzwilliam, Sir George Fitzwilliam of Mablethorpe (died 19 September 1536), and William Fitzwilliam of Louth. John predeceased him, and he was succeeded by John's son, another Thomas, who also died young in 1502. The estates then passed to Sir Thomas' second son, George.

Political offices
Preceded by Sir John Mordaunt	Speaker of the House of Commons; 1489–1490	Succeeded by Sir Richard Empson
