= St Peter's Church, Trusthorpe =

Parish church in Trusthorpe, Lincolnshire, England

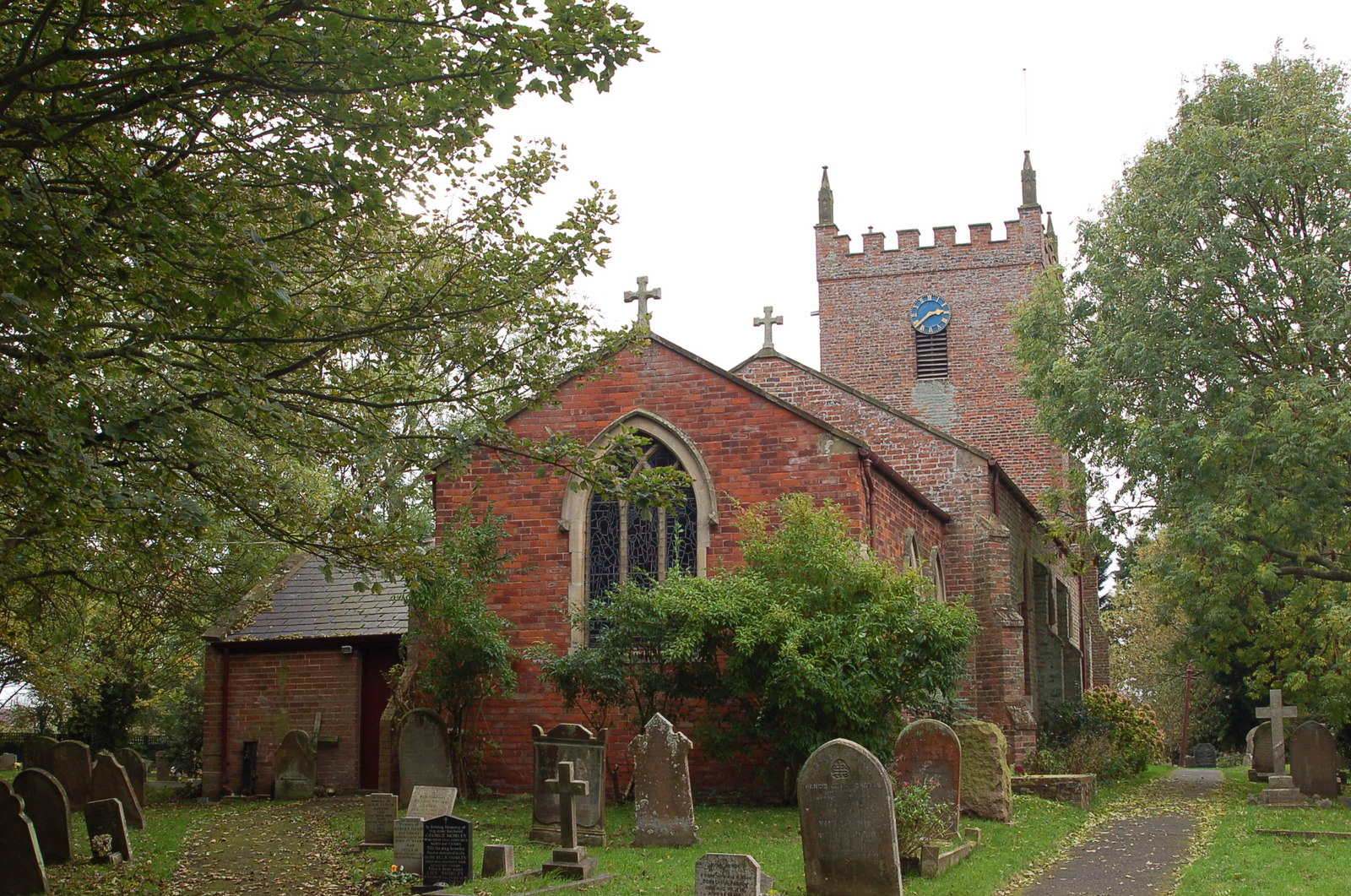
- St Peter's Church, Trusthorpe
- 53.327960°N 0.271928°E
- OS grid reference: TF 51409 83634
- Location: Trusthorpe, Lincolnshire
- Country: England
- Denomination: Church of England
- Website: lincoln.ourchurchweb.org.uk/mablethorpesutton/churches/page2/

History
- Status: Parish church

Listed Building
- Designated: 09 July 1986
- Reference no.: 1359993
- Dedication: Saint Peter

Specifications
- Materials: Random mixed rubble, red brick and slate roof

Administration
- Province: Canterbury
- Diocese: Lincoln
- Archdeaconry: Stow and Lindsey
- Parish: Mablethorpe and Sutton

St Peter's Church, Trusthorpe is a parish church in Trusthorpe in Lincolnshire, England, dating back in part to the 13th century. The tower was built in 1606, elements of the chancel arch are 14th century, and the octagonal font is dated as c.1400. The nave was built in 1842 and the chancel in 1941. Much of the church is in red brick with stone dressings and slate roofing. The tower is buttressed and has a parapet, with four stone pinnacles. Apart from the font, the interior fittings are 19th and 20th century.

The church is Grade II listed and is an active place of worship, with services held twice weekly as of 2025.
