= St Mary's Church, Mablethorpe =

14th-century church in Lincolnshire, England

- Mablethorpe St Mary
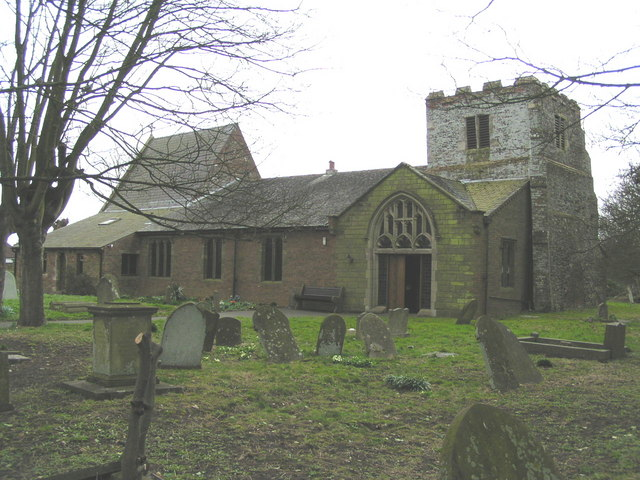
- St Mary's Church, Mablethorpe
- St Mary's Church, Mablethorpe
- 53.3366°N 0.2481°E
- OS grid reference: TF 49780 84539
- Location: Mablethorpe, Lincolnshire
- Country: England
- Denomination: Anglican
- Website: St Mary's, Mablethorpe

History
- Status: Parish church

Architecture
- Style: Medieval architecture
- Groundbreaking: 1300

Specifications
- Materials: Random mixed rubble

Administration
- Province: Canterbury
- Diocese: Lincoln
- Archdeaconry: Stow and Lindsey
- Parish: Mablethorpe and Sutton

Listed Building
- Designated: 31 May 1966
- Reference no.: 1359994

St Mary's Church is an active Anglican parish church in Mablethorpe, Lincolnshire, England. Built in the early 14th century, it was renovated with additions in 1714, and in 1976 it was extensively rebuilt. In 1966 the church was designated a grade II listed building.

== History ==
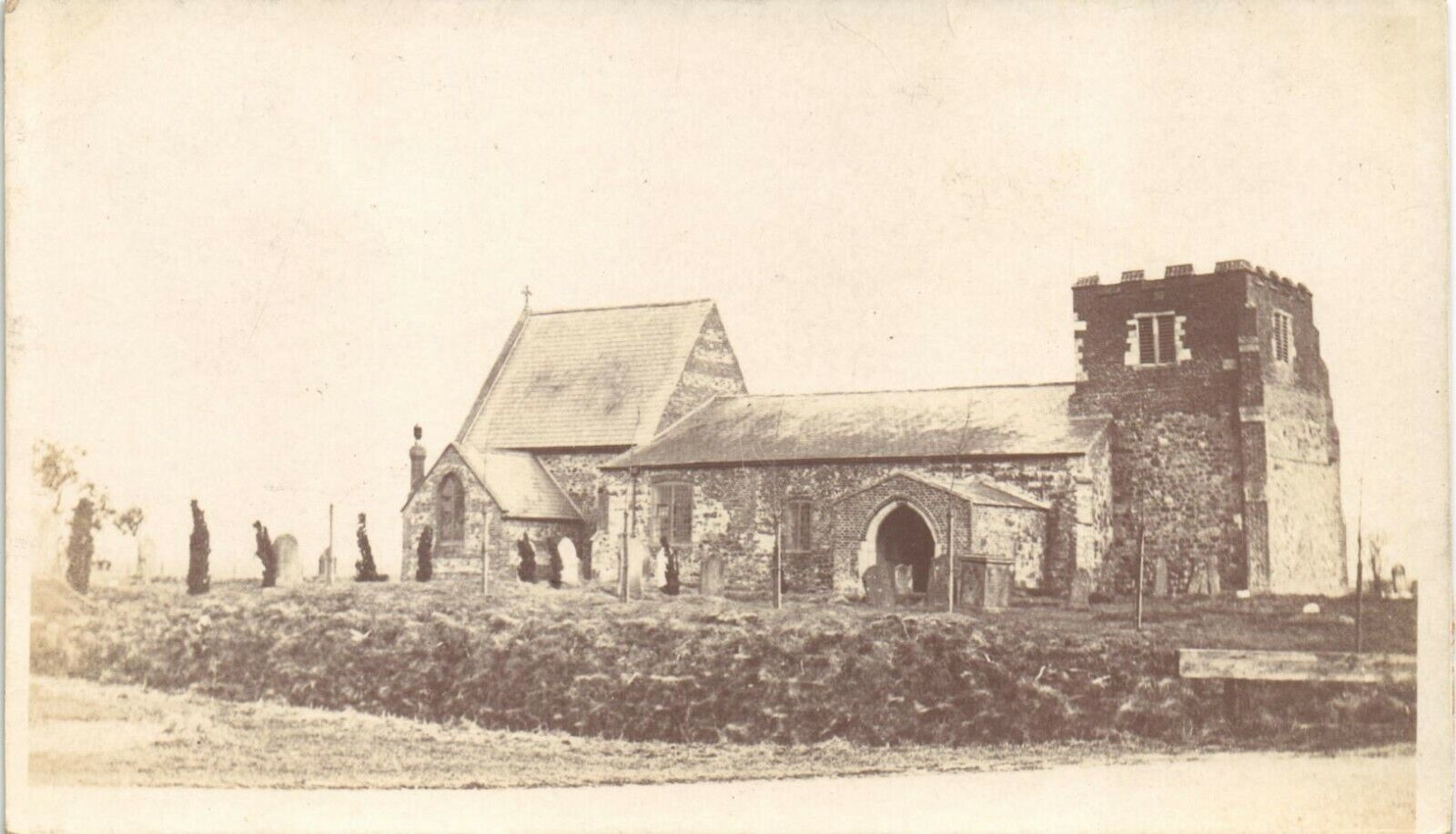
1906 Postcard of St Mary's Church, Mablethorpe

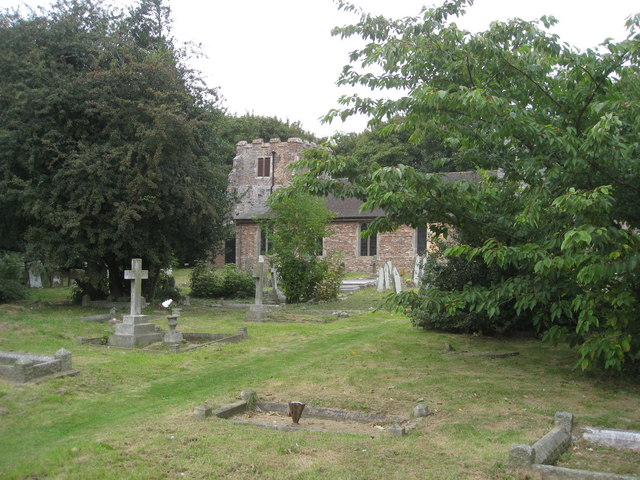
View of the church and surrounding graveyard

In 1300 Sir Roger de Montalt donated the land for the church and paid for the original arcade of the nave, octagonal piers and double-chamfered arches. The nave was rebuilt in 1714 and in 1976. In 1978 the arches of the nave were timber struts fortified with the old piers left in place. In the church a communion rail dates to 1714. It features a set of turned baluster altar rails.

Located at the junction of Church Road and Church Lane it is the town's parish church. On 31 May 1966 it was designated a grade II listed building. In 1976 G.R.A. Mack of Louth rebuilt the majority of the church. The 1976 British Isles heat wave caused the clay bed to shrink and cracks developed on the structure.

== Description ==
The church has been described as having a camel-back appearance. It has a low tower made of stone and brick. The lower part is stone and the upper part is brick. It has diagonal stepped brick buttresses which are offset to the belfry and embattled parapet. The materials used for construction were random mixed rubble stone, red brick and it has a slate roof. The chancel is built from brick and stone and has an eastern-facing window. The font is panelled and dates to 1400. The west side of the aisle has a limestone ledger slab with a full-length figure.

At the north aisle there is a brass plate with inscription for Sir Thomas Fitzwilliam (1403) and in the south aisle his wife Elizabeth (1403). There is brass plaque above the north door, for Elizabeth Fitzwilliam (1522) with a full-length portrait.

There is a tomb and Easter Sepulchre which dates to 1494 and it is thought to contain the remains of Thomas Fitzwilliam.
