= St Clement's Church, Sutton-on-Sea =

Parish church in Sutton-on-Sea, Lincolnshire, England

- Church of St. Clement, Sutton-on-Sea
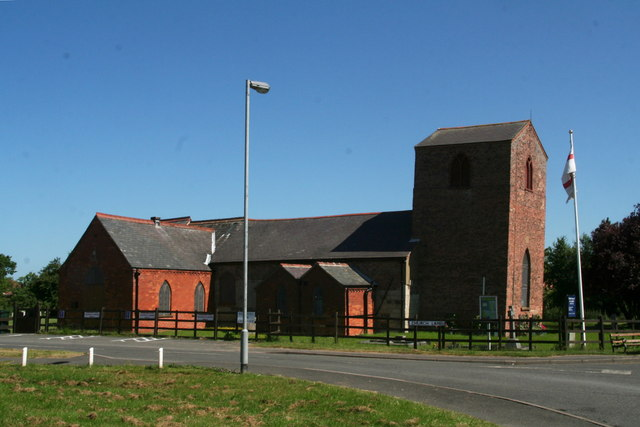
- St Clement's Church, Sutton-on-Sea
- St Clement's Church, Sutton-on-Sea
- 53.303218°N 0.281100°E
- OS grid reference: TF 52114 80903
- Location: Sutton-on-Sea, Lincolnshire
- Country: England
- Denomination: Church of England
- Website: St Clement's, Sutton on Sea

History
- Former name(s): Sutton le Marsh & Sutton in Marisco
- Status: Parish church

Listed Building
- Designated: 31 May 1966
- Reference no.: 1062981
- Dedication: Clement of Rome
- Dedicated: 1819
- Consecrated: 1819

Architecture
- Style: Medieval architecture

Specifications
- Materials: Random mixed rubble, red brick and slate roof

Administration
- Province: Canterbury
- Diocese: Lincoln
- Archdeaconry: Stow and Lindsey
- Parish: Mablethorpe and Sutton

St Clement's Church, Sutton-on-Sea is a Church of England parish church in Sutton-on-Sea, Lincolnshire, England. Built in the early 19th century, it was renovated with additions in 1860, and in 1907. In 1966 the church was designated a grade II listed building. The church is locally known as the "leaning church".

== History ==
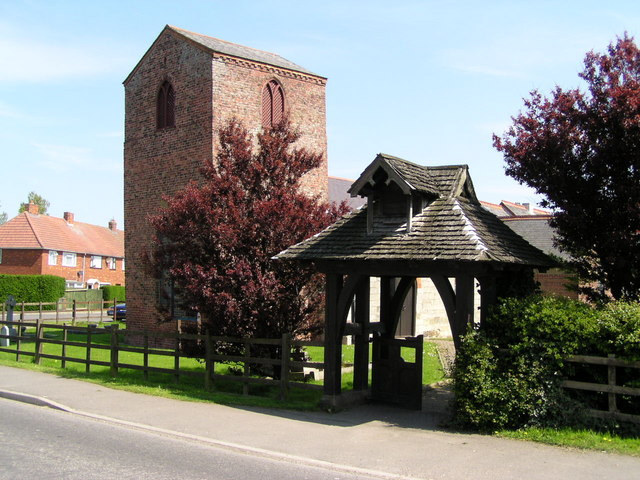
St. Clements Church in 2006 and its lych gate.

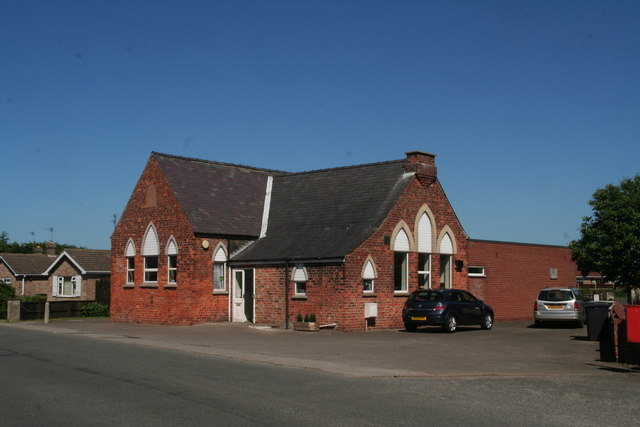
The church hall for St. Clements Church

The church was originally built in 1819 and was dedicated to Clement of Rome. It saw additions and extensions between 1860 and 1907. It is located between Church Lane and Huttoft Road. It sits to the south of Sutton on Sea town centre.

== Present day ==
The church is still used for regular worship and community events. In 2007, during a national survey about coastal erosion, a stone with a decorative pinnacle was located on the western door porch. It is believed to be from the medieval period. The church is a Grade II listed building and was listed in 1966.
