= Mablethorpe =

Seaside town in East Lindsey, Lincolnshire

Coordinates: 53.3409°N 0.261°E

- Town and Civil Parish
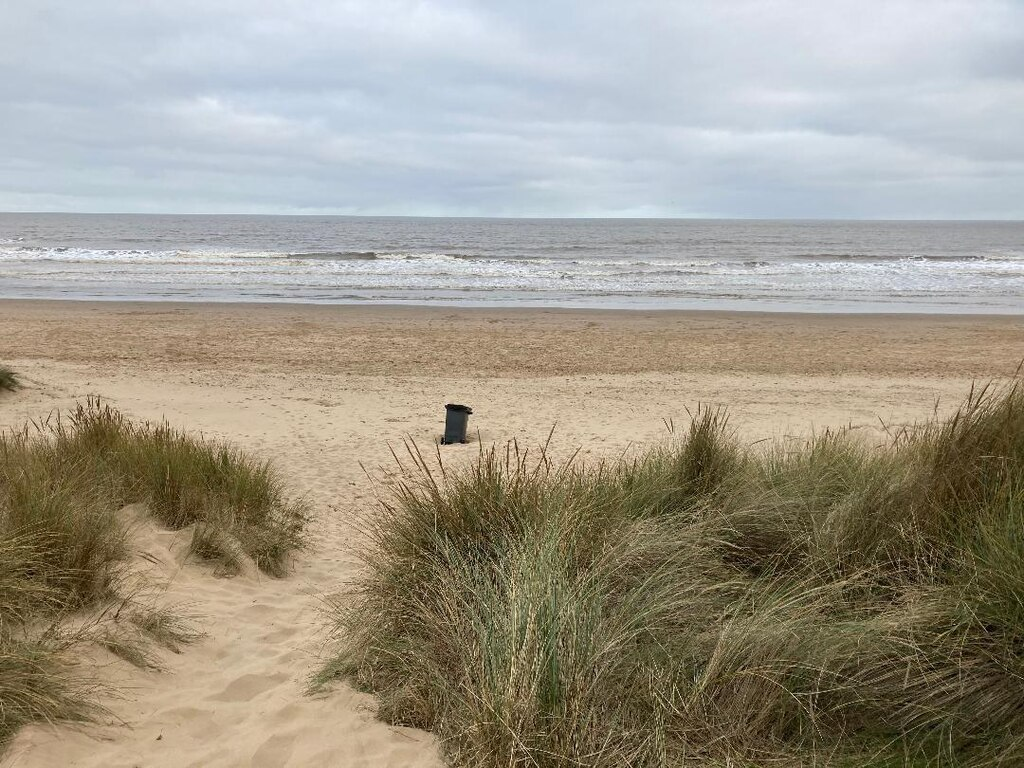
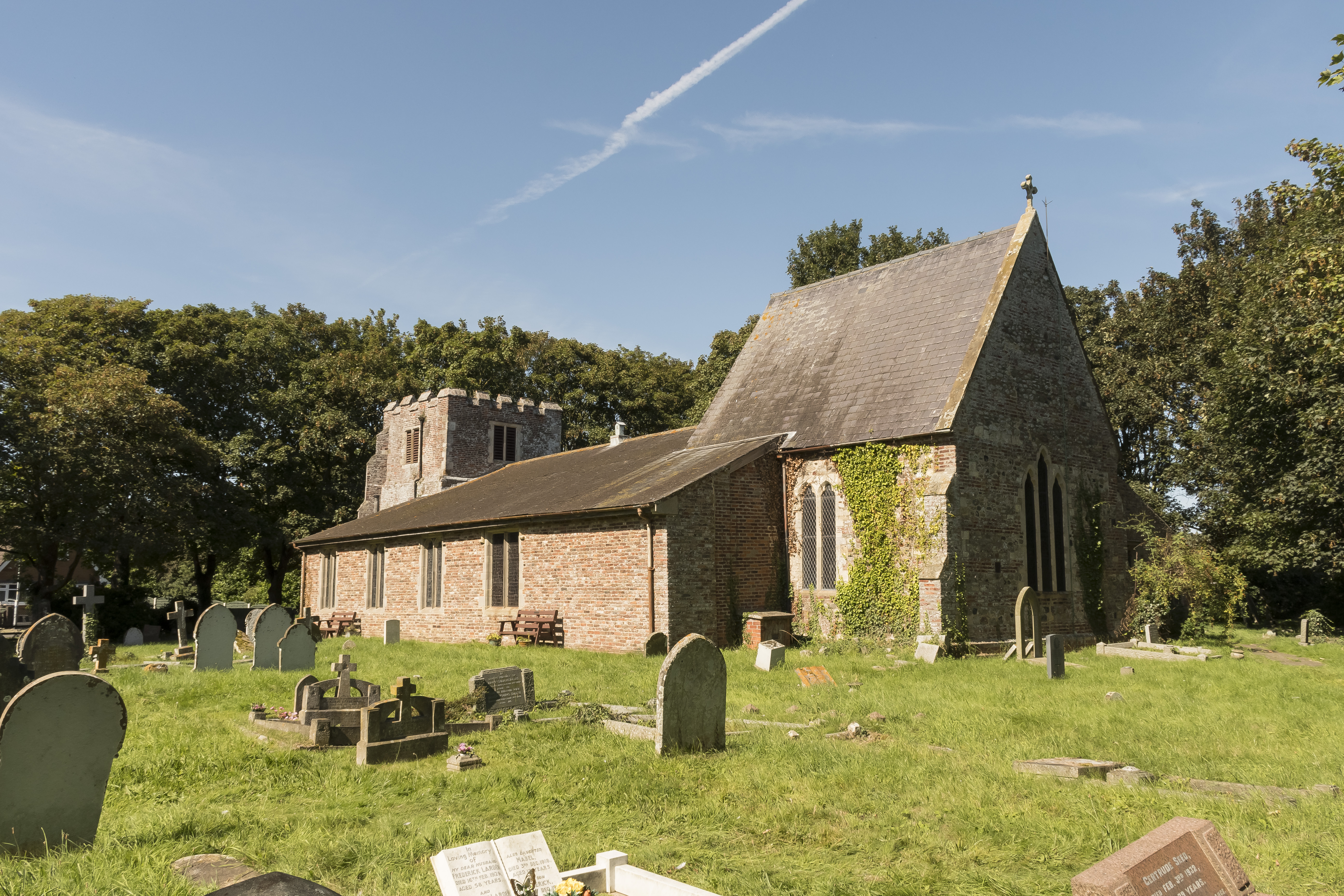
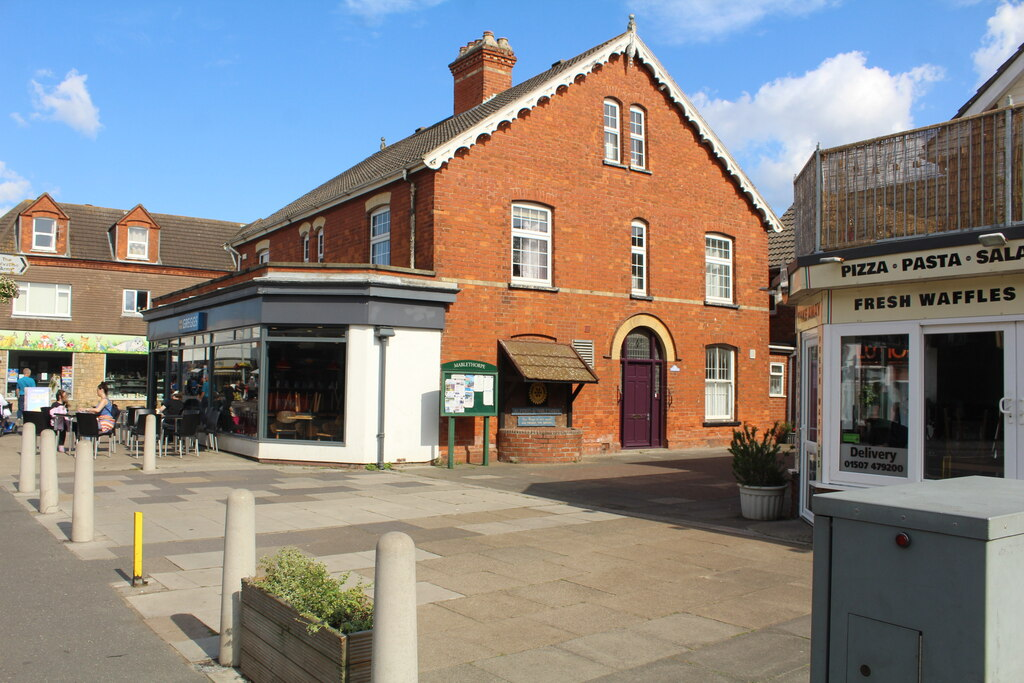
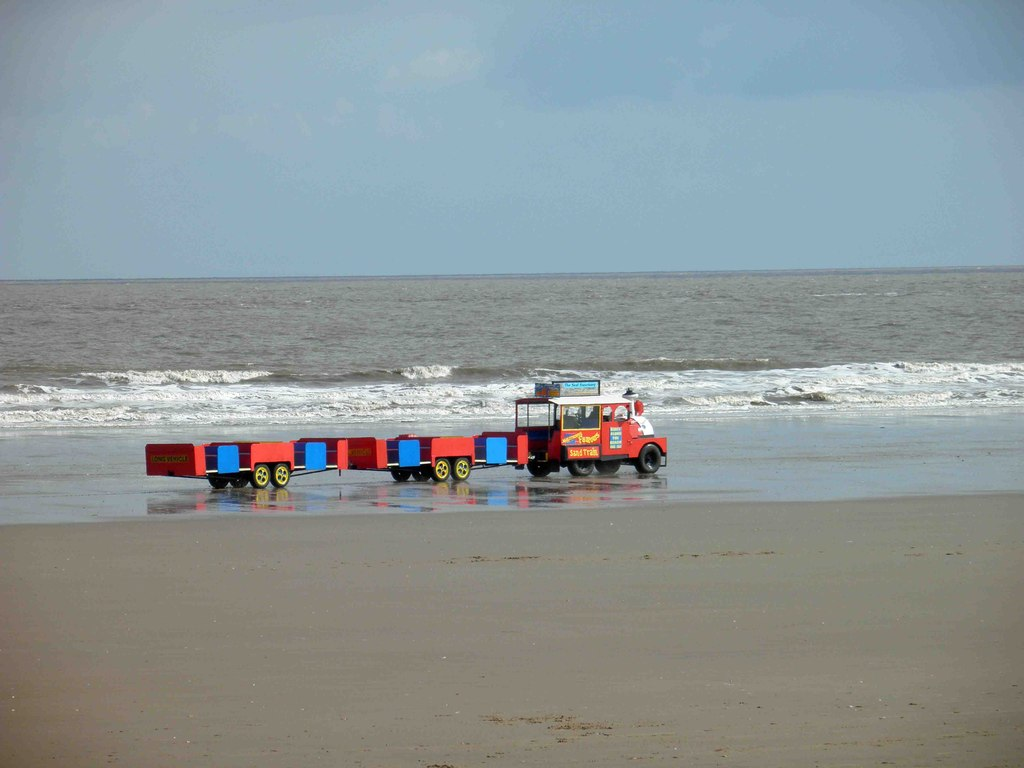
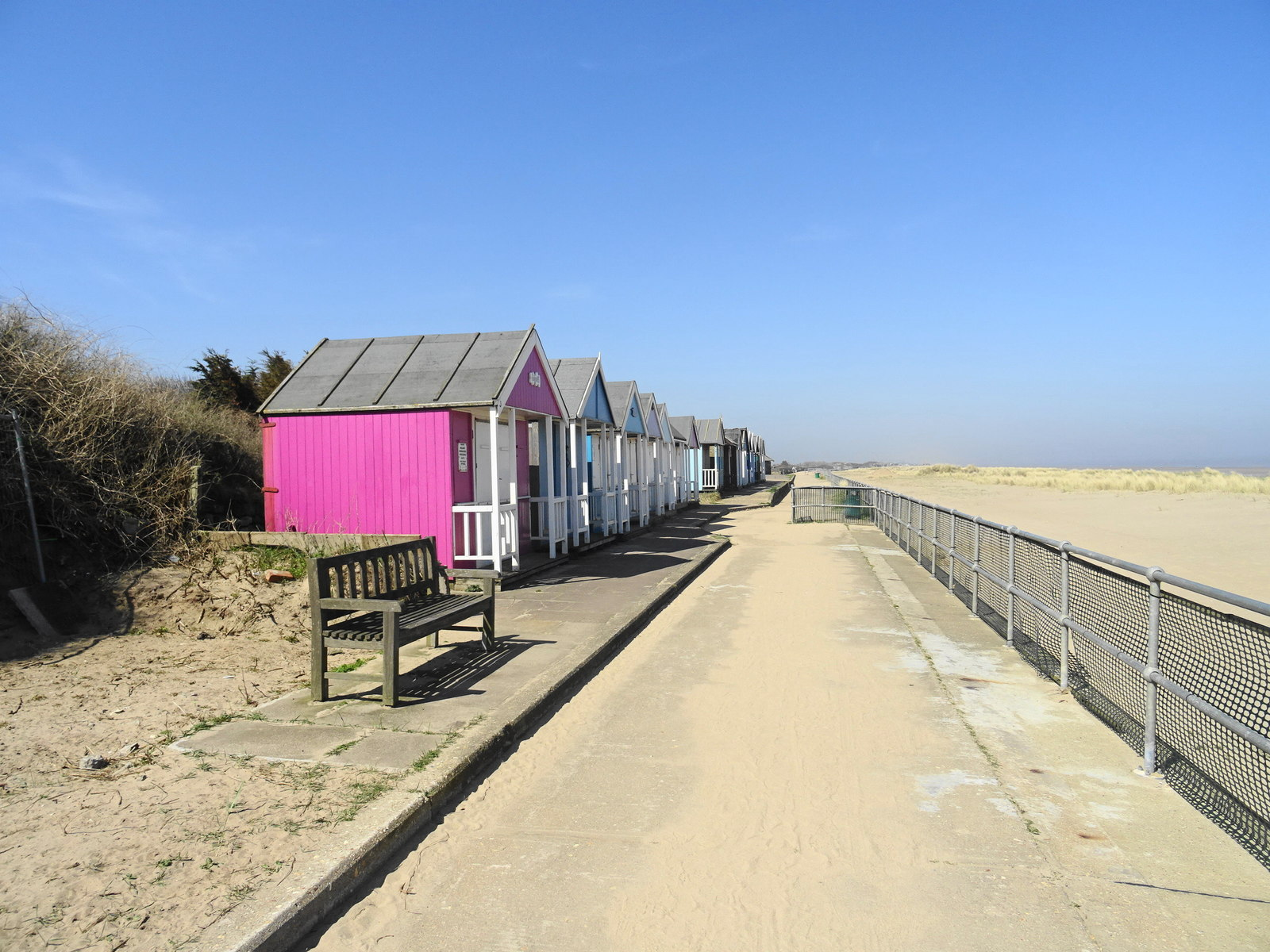
- The Beach St Mary’s Church High Street Sand Train Promenade

- Location within Lincolnshire
- Population: 12,668 (2011. with Sutton-on-Sea)
- OS grid reference: TF506850
  - London: 130 mi (210 km) SSW
- Civil parish: Mablethorpe and Sutton
- District: East Lindsey
- Shire county: Lincolnshire
- Region: East Midlands
- Country: England
- Sovereign state: United Kingdom
- Areas of the town: List: Miami Beach; Saltfleetby; Saltfleetby All Saints; Saltfleetby St Clements; Saltfleetby St Peter; Sandilands; Sutton-on-Sea; Theddlethorpe; Theddlethorpe All Saints; Theddlethorpe St Helen; Thorpe; Trusthorpe
- Post town: MABLETHORPE
- Postcode district: LN12
- Dialling code: 01507
- Police: Lincolnshire
- Fire: Lincolnshire
- Ambulance: East Midlands
- UK Parliament: Louth and Horncastle

Mablethorpe is a seaside town in the civil parish of Mablethorpe and Sutton, in the East Lindsey district of Lincolnshire, England. The population including nearby Sutton-on-Sea was 12,531 at the 2011 census and estimated at 12,633 in 2019.

The town was visited regularly by Alfred, Lord Tennyson, a 19th-century Poet Laureate of the United Kingdom. Some town features have been named after him, such as Tennyson Road and the now closed Tennyson High School.

== History ==
In 1961 the civil parish had a population of 3,611. On 1 April 1974 the parish was abolished to form "Mablethorpe and Sutton".

=== Roman Empire ===
A hoard of Roman treasure was found in Mablethorpe in the 1980s, as were a Roman brooch and pottery.

=== Toponymy ===
The name Mablethorpe derives from the Old Norse malbertþorp meaning 'Malbert's secondary settlement'.

=== Mablethorpe Hall ===
Mablethorpe has existed as a town for many centuries, gaining its market town charter in 1253. Coastal erosion means some of it was lost to the sea in the 1540s. Records of the Fitzwilliam family of Mablethorpe Hall date back to the 14th century. In the 19th century, it was a centre for ship breaking in the winter. Mablethorpe Hall is to the west of the town along Alford Road near the Church of St Mary. The Mablethorpe church parish includes Trusthorpe.

=== Town lifeboats ===
Mablethorpe's first lifeboatstation was built in 1883. It was closed temporarily in 1917 due to crew shortages in the First World War but the closure was made permanent in 1920. It reopened as an inshore lifeboat station in 1965. It operates two lifeboats, an Atlantic 85 and a smaller D-class.

=== East Coast floods ===
In 1953, Mablethorpe was hit by the disastrous East Coast floods. The seawall was breached on 31 January. A granite rock memorial was unveiled on the coast on 31 January 2013 on the 60th anniversary of the disaster, in memory of the town's 42 victims.

=== In literature ===
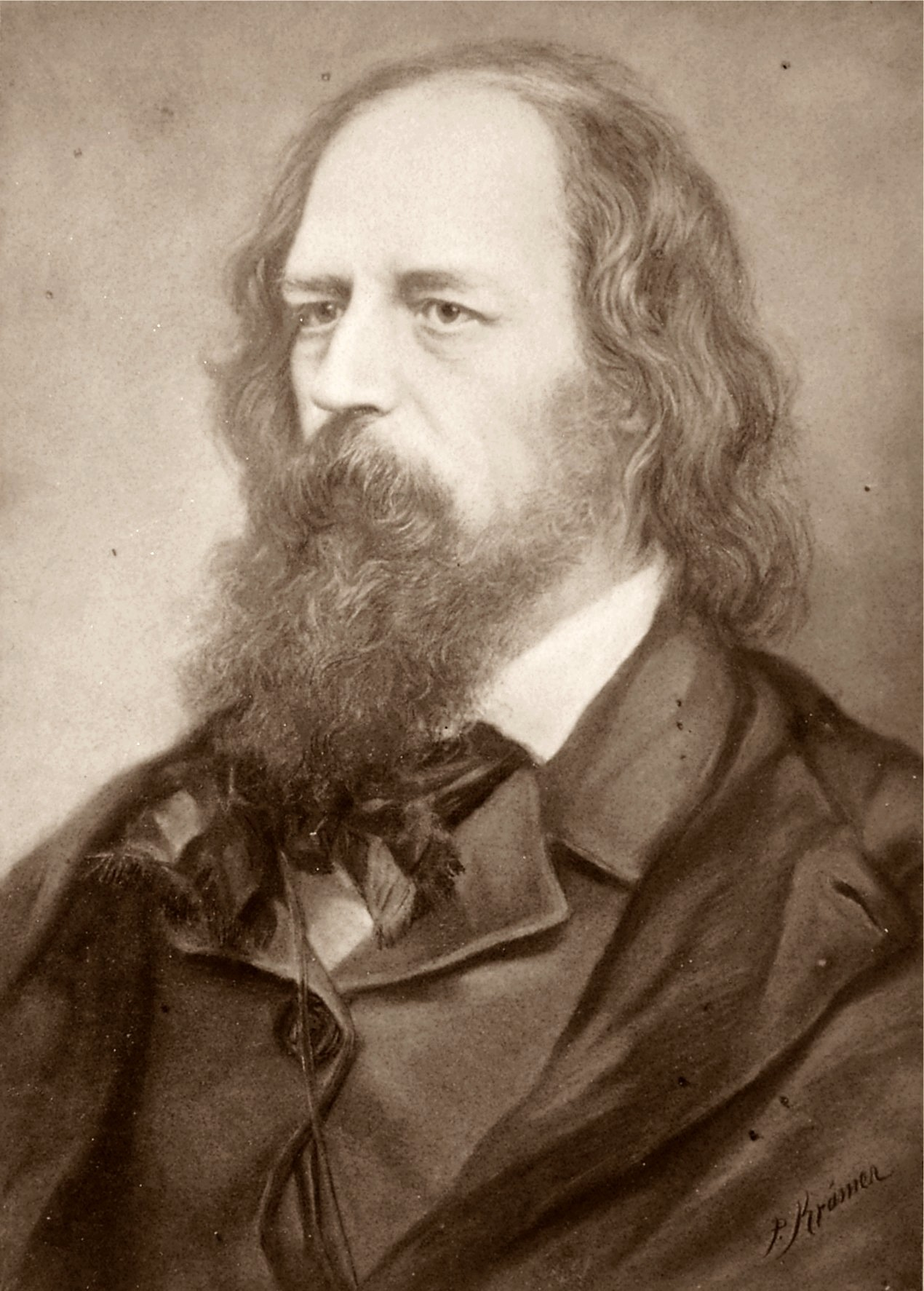
One of Britain's most renowned historical poets, Alfred, Lord Tennyson, once frequented Mablethorpe. It is said that he used to shout his poetry aloud towards the sea.

Mablethorpe is the destination for the fictional Morel family's first holiday in the still popular D. H. Lawrence novel, Sons and Lovers, published in 1913: "At last they got an answer from Mablethorpe, a cottage such as they wished for thirty shillings a week. There was immense jubilation. Paul was wild with joy for his mother's sake. She would have a real holiday now. He and she sat at evening picturing what it would be like. Annie came in, and Leonard, and Alice, and Kitty. There was wild rejoicing and anticipation. Paul told Miriam. She seemed to brood with joy over it. But the Morels' house rang with excitement."

Mablethorpe is the seaside setting for the Ted Lewis crime novel GBH, published in 1980. The novel was his last and has been described as a "lost masterwork".

== Transport ==
Mablethorpe and much of east Lincolnshire lost its rail service in 1970 to the Beeching Axe, despite its long history. The station site is now the town's sports centre.

Stagecoach operate an hourly service to Skegness, as well as a service to Louth and Lincoln. Grayscroft Coaches operates several services from a base in Victoria Road. Brylaine runs a service between Mablethorpe and Alford and Spilsby, usually every two hours.

Lincolnshire County Council operates a demand-responsive CallConnect service linking remoter areas to connection points at Alford, Chapel St Leonards and Mablethorpe for mainline bus services.

== Geography ==
Mablethorpe, in the East Lindsey council district, is administered with Sutton-on-Sea and Trusthorpe as the civil parish of Mablethorpe and Sutton. The original parish of Mablethorpe covers a rectangular area inland along Alford Road towards Maltby le Marsh, as far as Grange Leisure Park, where Earl's Bridge crosses West Bank. The south of the former parish follows the Trusthorpe Drains, which are crossed at Bamber's Bridge on Mile Lane. Out towards Alford lies Strubby Airfield, with the Strubby Aviation Club and Lincs Gliding Club. To the north is the large parish of Theddlethorpe St Helen, which extends to the River Great Eau at Saltfleetby. The town is the eastern terminus of the A52. The town is also accessed by the A1104 and A16 through Alford. The A157 heads west towards Louth and is said to be the "sixth bendiest A-road in the UK".

== Demographics ==
At the 2021 census, Mablethorpe and Sutton had a population of 12,668.

== Commerce ==
The town's one retail bank branch, Barclays, closed in July 2019. There are four supermarkets – a Co-op (which also includes a branch of Boyes), Lidl and from October 2021 the very first Tesco opened its doors. 'Lord Bros' an independent supermarket on Victoria Road has been open since the early 1960s. Branches of some high street chains are present, but most shops in Mablethorpe are independently operated. Market days vary through the year: Monday (Summer), Thursday (year round).

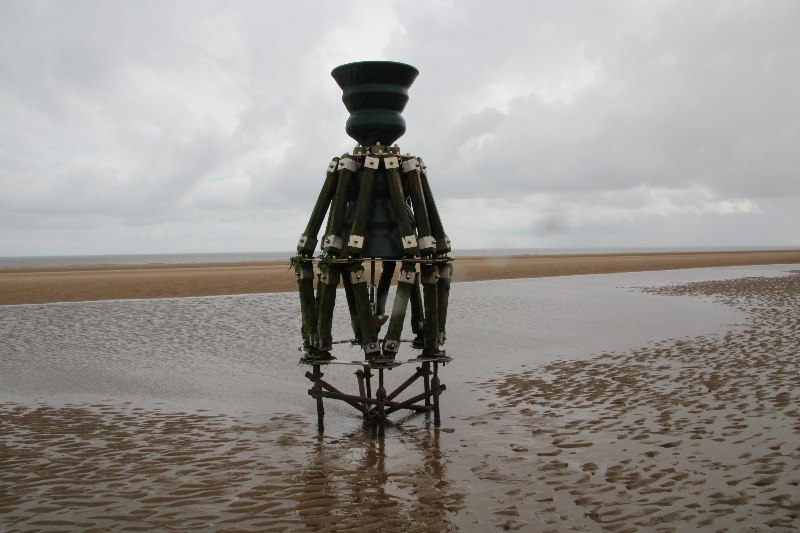
The Time and Tide Bell

== Attractions and tourism ==
Family attractions include a small fairground and an award-winning beach with traditional seaside amusement arcades and one of the largest family entertainment centers in England named The Mirage. One of Mablethorpe's long-standing features, its sand train, takes visitors to and from the northern end of the beach. Mablethorpe Seal Sanctuary and Wildlife Centre is also north of the town.

A Time and Tide Bell installed on the beach near the Seal Sanctuary in 2019 is one of a series around the UK, rung by high tides.

A star sculpture named Star of the East was created by Michael Trainor in 2007 in North Gardens, along the foreshore. It is 14 m (46 ft) high, casting light around the seafront.

Mablethorpe's cinema, the Loewen in Quebec Road, was previously known as the Bijou. The Dunes leisure complex lies on Mablethorpe's seafront. The seafront also gained a skatepark in 2008, which includes a small funbox, a spine and two quarter pipes.

Several small caravan parks and guest houses provide tourist accommodation.

== Electric power ==
Just over a mile north-east of the town, near the Seal Sanctuary, was the now-closed Theddlethorpe Gas Terminal, which supplied 5 per cent of the UK's gas. To the west is the Bambers wind farm, housing eight turbines and producing five MW of power since November 2004. An extension called Bambers II opened in November 2006 and produces an additional five MW of power. The two turbines of Mablethorpe wind farm, which produce 1.2 MW of power, were the first such in Lincolnshire when built in July 2002. All three wind farms are owned by Ecotricity and stand at the corner of West Bank and the Trusthorpe Drains.

== Media ==
The local weekly newspapers are the Mablethorpe Leader and The East Lindsey Target.

Local news and television programmes are provided by BBC Yorkshire and Lincolnshire and ITV Yorkshire & That’s Tv Humber, Television signals are received from the Belmont TV transmitter.

Radio coverage for Mablethorpe is provided by BBC Radio Lincolnshire and Hits Radio Lincolnshire.

== Education ==
The community's primary school is Mablethorpe Primary Academy School. The Mablethorpe site of Monks' Dyke Tennyson College closed in August 2016.

== Events ==
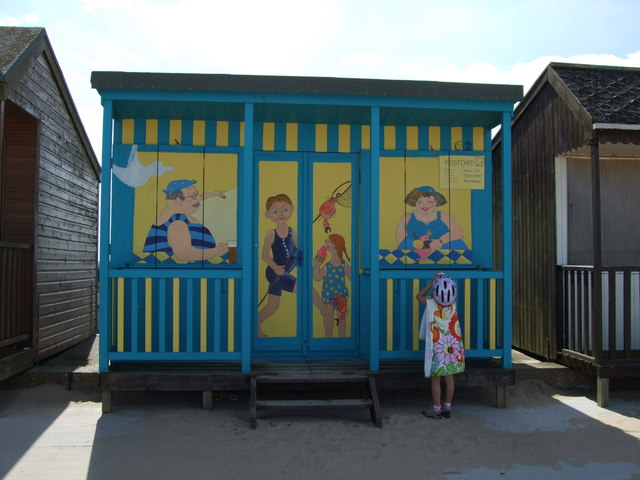
A decorated beach hut on Mablethorpe's seafront

Mablethorpe hosts a unique beach-hut festival each September. Privately owned beach huts compete in outward design, amidst a backdrop of poetry, music, and drama.

Mablethorpe has long hosted motorbike sand racing each winter and spring, in which several famous riders from motorcycle racing have taken part - including Neil Tuxworth, Roger Marshall, Alan Carter, Steve Hislop and Carl Fogarty. This has inspired the Lincolnshire Bike Week, following the Mablethorpe and Sutton-on-Sea Bike Nights.

Each summer Mablethorpe hosts an illuminations event (a "switch on"), for which a celebrity is invited. Those officiating have included Barbara Windsor, Timmy Mallett and Wolf and Hunter of Gladiators.
