= Ernest Howden =

New Zealand cricketer

Personal information
- Full name: Charles Ernest Howden
- Born: 22 October 1881; Dunedin, Otago, New Zealand
- Died: 9 October 1963 (aged 81); Rotorua, Bay of Plenty, New Zealand
- Batting: Right-handed
- Relatives: Alister Howden (brother); Peter Howden (son)

Domestic team information
- Years: Team
- 1902/03–1908/09: Otago
- Source: ESPNcricinfo, 14 May 2016

Charles Ernest Howden (22 October 1881 – 9 October 1963) was a New Zealand cricketer. He played 13 first-class matches, 11 of them for Otago, between the 1902–03 and 1908–09 seasons.

== Life and career ==
Howden was born at Dunedin in 1881 and educated at Otago Boys' High School in the city. The family had recently arrived in New Zealand from Scotland, where Howden's older brother Alister was born on Rothesay in 1877. Howden's father, Charles Ritchie Howden, was born at Edinburgh and had come to New Zealand earlier to work initially in sheep farming. He helped establish the first Dunedin Golf Club in the early 1870s and was its first captain; the club is the oldest in the southern hemisphere. He is a member of the New Zealand Golf Hall of Fame. The family moved back to Scotland for a time, but had returned to Dunedin by 1892.

Howden played both golf and cricket from a young age and scored a cricket century whilst at school. He attended the University of Otago, matriculating in 1900 and graduating with a medical degree and studying for a time in 1907–1908 in London where he qualified with the Royal College of Physicians.

Whilst a student Howden began playing club cricket for Carisbrook Cricket Club, with the local cricket correspondent judging his standard to be "excellent" at the start of the 1901–02 season. He served as the club's secretary, captained the A team, and was described as "a favourite" with spectators. and as a "popular captain". By 1907 he was considered the "most attractive and stylish bat in Dunedin".

After making his representative debut for Otago in December 1902 in a match against Canterbury at Carisbrook, Howden played in 13 first-class matches, including four for Otago against touring sides and two for South Island. He scored a total of 386 first-class runs with a highest score of 62, his only half-century in first-class matches. His final match was in December 1908 against an Auckland team featuring his brother, who got him out in both innings.

On returning to New Zealand in 1908, Howden worked as the superintendent of Waikato Sanatorium before purchasing a medical practice in Waiuku in 1911. He played club cricket at Farquharson Cricket Club. A successful club golfer, he played the game regularly and was president of Waiuku golf club.

During World War I Howden served in the New Zealand Medical Corps, reaching the rank of captain and working at the New Zealand hospital near Amiens in France. In World War II he acted as the senior medical officer at the Papakura mobilisation camp, rising to the rank of temporary lieutenant-colonel.

Howden died at Rotorua in October 1963, aged 81. His son, Peter Howden, also played for Otago.
