= Alastair Morrison =

Alastair or Alasdair Morrison may refer to:

- Alastair Ardoch Morrison (1911–1998), Australian graphic artist and author
- Alasdair Morrison (politician) (born 1968), Scottish Labour Party politician
- Alasdair Morrison (banker) (born 1948), banker
- Alastair Morrison (British Army officer) (1924–2007), British Army officer
