= Alistair Scott =

Alistair Scott may refer to:

- Ally Scott (born 1950), Scottish former professional football player
- Alistair Scott (The Inbetweeners), a fictional wheelchair-using student appearing in some 2010 episodes of the British sitcom The Inbetweeners

== See also ==
- Alastair Scott (disambiguation)
