= Louth Rural District =

Former local government area in England

Coordinates: 53.38°N 0.04°E

Louth
- Louth Rural District shown within Parts of Lindsey in 1970.
- History
  - Created: 1894
  - Abolished: 1974
  - Succeeded by: East Lindsey
- Status: Rural district

Louth was a rural district in Lincolnshire, Parts of Lindsey from 1894 to 1974. It was created in 1894 from Louth rural sanitary district. It did not include Louth, which was a separate municipal borough entirely surrounded by the rural district. Its boundaries changed little, losing Trusthorpe to the Mablethorpe and Sutton Urban District in 1925 and ceding suburbs to Louth. It was abolished by the Local Government Act 1972 in 1974 and made part of the new East Lindsey district.
