= Peter Howden =

New Zealand cricketer

Charles Peter Howden (21 October 1911 – 6 July 2003) was a New Zealand cricketer. He was a right-handed batsman who played for Otago. He was born and died at Auckland.

Howden made two first-class appearances for the team, during the 1937–38 Plunket Shield season. He scored 11 runs in two innings on his debut, and 52 runs in his second match.

Educated at King's College, Howden followed his father Ernest in qualifying as a doctor. He served in the New Zealand Medical Corps during World War II. Both his father and uncle, Alister, also played first-class cricket. Following his death in 2003 an obituary was published in the New Zealand Cricket Almanack of 2006.
