= Alastair Morrison (British Army officer) =

British Army officer (1924–2007)

Alastair McLeod Morrison MC
- Born: 2 March 1924; Sandilands, Lincolnshire, England
- Died: 2 April 2007 (aged 83)
- Military career
- Allegiance: United Kingdom
- Branch: British Army
- Service years: 1941−1952
- Rank: Major
- Service number: 293718
- Unit: 4th/7th Dragoon Guards
- Conflicts: World War II
- Awards: Military Cross

Major Alastair McLeod Morrison MC (2 March 1924 – 2 April 2007) was a British Army soldier of the 4th/7th Royal Dragoon Guards who won the Military Cross in Holland in 1944. In the aftermath of Operation Market Garden, Morrison repulsed an enemy attack in his tank until his ammunition ran out. Earlier in the Second World War he had been present during the Normandy landings on D-Day at Gold Beach. After the war, Morrison had a career in business and later became known for his tours of the Normandy beaches.

== Early life ==
Alastair McLeod Morrison was born on 2 March 1924 at Sandilands, Lincolnshire, and educated at Haileybury College. A good games player and oarsman, he had a successful rugby trial for Scotland and rowed at Henley for Sandhurst and subsequently for the Imperial Service College.

== Career ==
He enlisted in 1941, trained as a paratrooper, and in 1943 attended a war-time Octu at RMC Sandhurst before being commissioned into the 4th/7th Dragoon Guards.

Morrison led 4th Troop "A" Squadron in the Normandy landings on D-Day during 69 Infantry Brigade's assault on Gold Beach. He took part in the fierce fighting at Lingevres, west of Caen, in support of 9th Battalion Durham Light Infantry; the village was captured at a heavy cost in casualties. Promoted captain aged 20, Morrison commanded the regimental reconnaissance troop of 15 tanks in the push eastwards through Holland and Germany. After the end of the war he served with his regiment in Egypt, Palestine and Tripolitania. He was an instructor at Mons for a spell before retiring from the Army in 1952.

== Post-war ==
Morrison spoke fluent French and became managing director of a small agricultural engineering company near Paris before moving to the United States, again as MD within the same group. In 1960 he returned to England and, based in Suffolk, served as a director within the Howard Group of companies.

A natural shot and an accomplished fisherman, in 1984 Morrison retired to a village in Wiltshire, where he took an active part in many charitable activities within his local community and beyond. He was often invited on battlefield tours of Normandy. For 15 years he was a guest speaker on the Staff College Battlefield Tour and remained a guest speaker on the Realities of War annual seminar at Joint Services Command and Staff College.

Morrison was instrumental in establishing the memorial to his regiment at Creully, Normandy. He was introduced to the Prince of Wales at the 60th anniversary celebrations there in 2004, and the BBC also filmed him for their 60th anniversary tribute.

Alastair McLeod Morrison died on 2 April 2007 at the age of 83. In 1957, he married Diana Griffith-Griffin, who survives him with their son and two daughters.
