= Alastair Duncan =

Alastair Duncan may refer to:

- Alastair Duncan (actor, born 1926) (1926–2005), English/Australian actor
- Alastair Duncan (Scottish actor), Scottish actor
- Alastair Duncan (British Army officer) (1952–2016), British Army general
- Alastair Duncan (wrestler), Scottish medallist at the 1958 Commonwealth Games

== See also ==
- Alasdair Duncan (born 1982), Australian author and journalist
