= Allister Whitehead =

- Also known as: Jame Gumb
- Born: 1969 or 1970 (age 54–55); Nottingham, United Kingdom
- Genres: House
- Years active: 1987–present
- Labels: Toolroom; Phonetic; Check It Out; Not On

Allister Whitehead is a British DJ, musician, remixer and record producer, based in Nottingham. He is widely regarded as one of United Kingdom's most prolific House DJs.

== Biography ==
He started DJing at the age of 17 in the year 1987, when he would become resident of the Koolkat club where he performed on Saturdays. He gained further recognition when he performed as resident at notable clubs such as Ministry of Sound and Gatecrasher. His music has been included on Gold- and Silver-certified compilation albums by Fantazia and Ministry of Sound. Whitehead has achieved commercial success in his production career as he worked with 'industry players' such as Martha Walsh, Natalie Imbruglia and Robbie Williams.

Speaking about how the rave scene has changed, Whitehead stated that "Eight or nine years ago, when all this started, I was playing all the old tracks and CDs but now there is a whole generation of people who are new to this. They want to hear what you can do now." Whitehead has been regularly featured as a Top 100 DJ on the DJ Mag poll.
