= Alastair Taylor =

Alastair or Alistair Taylor may refer to:

- Alastair Taylor (footballer) (born 1991), English soccer player
- Alastair M. Taylor (1915–2005), Canadian historian, filmmaker and UN official
- Alistair Taylor (1935–2004), English personal assistant of Brian Epstein, the manager of the Beatles
- Scotch Taylor (Alistair Innes Taylor, 1925–2004), South African cricketer

== See also ==
- Alistair, a list of given names Alistair and Alastair
- James Alastair Taylor (born 1951), Sheriff Principal of the Sheriffdom of Glasgow and Strathkelvin
