= Alastair Reid =

Alastair Reid may refer to:

- Alastair Reid (poet) (1926–2014), Scottish poet and scholar of South American literature
- Alastair Reid (director) (1939–2011), Scottish television and film director
- Alastair Reid (RAF officer), Royal Air Force officer and medical doctor
