= Alastair Adams =

English artist

Alastair Adams (born 1969 in Kingston Upon Thames) is an English artist best known for portraiture. He lives and works in Rutland.

== Life and work ==
Alastair studied painting at Hugh Baird College, Bootle and also at De Montfort University graduating in 1992. He was elected as a member of the Royal Society of Portrait Painters in 2002, became Treasurer in 2005 and President in 2008. Between 2002 and 2017 he held a research based post, lecturing in Illustration at Loughborough University.

Alastair's work can be found in numerous public and private collections, including a portrait of ex Prime Minister, Sir Tony Blair for the National Portrait Gallery, London and Princeton University Art Museum. He has donated 3 works of art to the People's Portrait Collection housed at Girton College, Cambridge. In 2020 Alastair joined a number of artists who pledged via social media to paint portraits of nominated NHS key workers for the Portraits for NHS Heroes art project during the COVID pandemic. He is a Trustee of the Federation of British Artists.

== Notable portraits ==
Since 2015, Alastair has been commissioned to paint a number of portraits for Yale University, New Haven, USA including two portraits of Chief Investment Officer David Swensen, and posthumous works of Carolyn Slayman, Dorothy Horstmann and Katherine Lustman.

- Tony Blair
- Sir Alastair Cook
- Nick Frost
- Bruce Robinson
