= Alasdair MacIlleBhàin =

Alasdair MacIlleBhàin is a singer and songwriter from Mull, performing primarily in Scottish Gaelic, who has performed widely on an international basis.

== Early life ==
MacIlleBhàin is from Salen, Mull. He has been deeply interested in Gaelic heritage and culture from a young age.

== Musical career ==
Alasdair MacIlleBhàin won the Gold Medal at the Royal National Mòd in Dunoon, Argyll in 2006 at 19 years old. MacIlleBhàin is a singer and songwriter and released his first album, "Las," containing both songs of his own and traditional songs from Mull, in December 2012. Alongside musician Ross Whyte he is a member of the band WHYTE, which has released three albums to date: Fairich (2016), Tairm (2019) and Maim (2021). The latter contained music commissioned for the cancelled theatrical production from Theatre gu Leòr of the same name. In 2020 MacIlleBhàin and Whyte released songs with Irish musicians under the name Lui Lom.

He has also judged regional Mòds and the Royal National Mòd since 2012.

Besides his musical career, MacIlleBhàin is a researcher in the Celtic and Gaelic Department of the University of Glasgow where he is doing PhD on place names of the Torsay region of Mull.

== Discography ==
- Las (2012)
- O Chruinneag E Chruinneag on the CD 'Guthan Eileanan na h-Alba' ("Hebridean Voices") from Tobar an Dualchais & Sabhal Mòr Ostaig (2012)
- WHYTE (2017)
