= Alasdair MacGriogair =

Scottish writer and minister

Reverend Alasdair MacGriogair (1806–1881) was a Scottish writer and minister.

Alasdair MacGriogair was born in 1806 in Glengairn, in Aberdeenshire, where his father was the minister. His father moved to the Kilmuir area on the Isle of Skye and after some years, Alasdair MacGriogair was appointed to be his father's assistant. He lived in the Kilmuir area until 1850, when he was put in charge of the Gaelic church in Edinburgh. Three years later, he moved to Inverness, where he remained until his death in 1881.

He wrote a great number of papers for Cuairtear, the Fear-tathaich nam Beann, and An Gaidheal, credited sometimes under the name Sgiathanach (Skyeman), and also as Alasdair Ruadh. He also made a translation of the Apocrypha into Gaelic, published in 1860 by Louis Lucien Bonaparte.

== Writings ==
- Mac Griogair, An t-Urramach Alasdair. (1915) 'Air Cruinn-mheallaibh Soillseach nan Speur' ann an Rosg Gàidhlig: Specimens of Gaelic Prose W. J. Watson (ed.) Inverness: An Comunn Gaidhealach, pp. 8–13.
