= Alasdair Maclay =

English former first-class cricketer (born 1973)

Personal information
- Full name: Alasdair Worsfold Maclay
- Born: 15 October 1973 (age 53); Salisbury, Wiltshire, England
- Batting: Right-handed
- Bowling: Right-arm medium-fast

Domestic team information
- Years: Team
- 1993–1996: Oxford University

Career statistics
Competition	First-class
Matches	12
Runs scored	17
Batting average	4.25
100s/50s	–/–
Top score	6*
Balls bowled	1,486
Wickets	11
Bowling average	78.81
5 wickets in innings	–
10 wickets in match	–
Best bowling	3/30
Catches/stumpings	3/–
- Source: Cricinfo, 9 June 2020

Alasdair Worsfold Maclay (born 15 October 1973) is an English former first-class cricketer.

Maclay was born at Salisbury in October 1973. He was educated at Winchester College, before going up to St Edmund Hall, Oxford. While studying at Oxford, he played first-class cricket for Oxford University from 1993–96, making twelve appearances. Playing as a right-arm medium-fast bowler, he took 11 wickets at an average of 78.81 and best figures of 3 for 30.

After graduating from Oxford, he spent eighteen years working in the financial services industry in London and South Africa, before working for The Rhodes Trust as the director of strategy and development where his focus was on expanding the Rhodes Scholarship to new geographic regions. Maclay is currently the chief funds officer of the Global Steering Group for Impact Investment.
