= Alastair McDonald =

Alastair McDonald, or variants, may refer to:

== After 1900 ==
- Alistair MacDonald (born 1970), British judge
- Alistair Macdonald (1925–1999), British Labour party politician
- Alastair Macdonald (surveyor) (born 1932), British land surveyor and author
- Alastair Macdonald (historian), Scottish historian
- Alastair McDonald (musician) (born 1941), Scottish banjo-playing folk/jazz musician
- Alisdair Macdonald (1940–2007), British press photographer

== Pre-20th century ==
- Alastair Macdonald (British Army officer), 19th century Commander-in-Chief, Scotland
- Alasdair Mac Colla (died 1647), 17th century Scottish military officer
- Alexander of Islay, Earl of Ross (died 1449), also known as Alasdair MacDonald, 15th century Scottish nobleman
- Alistair Carragh Macdonald, 15th century Scottish nobleman
- Alasdair Óg of Islay (died 1299), known as Alasdair MacDonald, 13th century Scottish Lord of Islay and chief of Clann Domhnaill
- Alasdair Mór, 13th century Scottish nobleman and eponymous ancestor of Clan MacAlister
