= McAllester =

McAllester is a surname. Notable people with the surname include:

- Bill McAllester (1888–1970), American baseball player
- David A. McAllester (born 1956), American academic
- David P. McAllester (1916–2006), American ethnomusicologist
- Jim McAllester (born 1959), Australian rules footballer
