= Alford and Sutton Tramway =

Tramway operator in England

Coordinates: 53°17′13″N 0°14′19″E

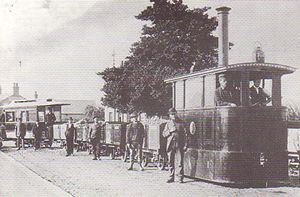
- Alford & Sutton Tramway

Overview
- Headquarters: Alford
- Locale: England
- Dates of operation: 1884–1889
- Successor: Abandoned

Technical
- Track gauge: 2 ft 6 in (762 mm)
- Length: 8 miles

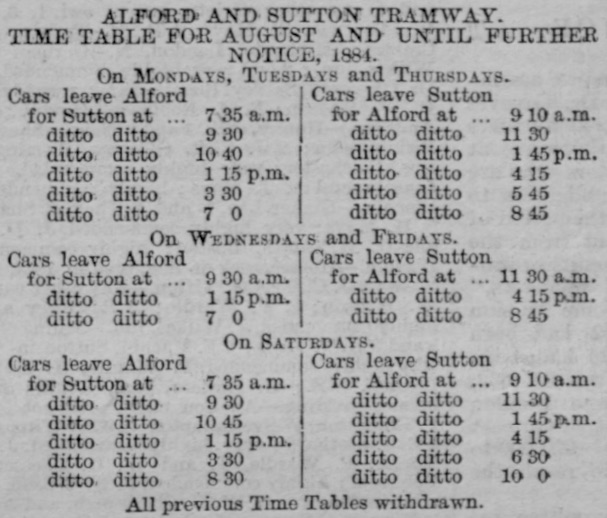
Timetable from the Lincolnshire Chronicle 8 August 1884

The Alford and Sutton Tramway was a steam 2 ft 6 in (762 mm) narrow gauge street tramway between the seaside town of Sutton-on-Sea and the nearby Great Northern Railway line at Alford in Lincolnshire.

== History ==
On 14 December 1882 the work of laying the track began in Alford. The contractor was W.B. Dick and Co of Leadenhall Street, London. Construction proceeded but there were objections from nearly every parish through which the tramway ran. Following an inspection by Major-General Charles Scrope Hutchinson, alterations were ordered which included widening the roadway at Bilsby Church and Markby Turn. At Hannah and Hannah Hill the gradient had to be eased and more safety post fences on the dyke side of the road were required. Two locomotives, three cars for passengers, and ten trucks for merchandise and two trucks for timber were acquired.

Services started on 4 April 1884 and the fare was 9d single, or 1s return.

There were initially plans to extend the tramway to Chapel St Leonards and Skegness, but the construction of the standard gauge Willoughby and Sutton Railway in 1888 drew traffic from the tramway.

== Closure ==
A downfall of snow on 26 November 1889 brought the service to a stop and on 7 December 1889 the Lincoln Gazette reported: "The Alford & Sutton Tramway have ceased to run their cars, ostensibly for the winter months, but really for an indefinite period....".

The removal of the tramway started on 25 October 1891. The removal of the rails was completed on Saturday 13 August 1892.

== See also ==
- British narrow gauge railways

== Sources ==
- Prideaux, J. D. C. A. (1978). The English Narrow Gauge Railway. David & Charles. ISBN 0-7153-7511-3.
- Dow, George (1984). Alford & Sutton Tramway. author.
- "Alford website - Alford - Sutton Tramway 1884 - 1889". Archived from the original on 23 May 2009.
