= Alexander Taylor (physician) =

Scottish physician and author

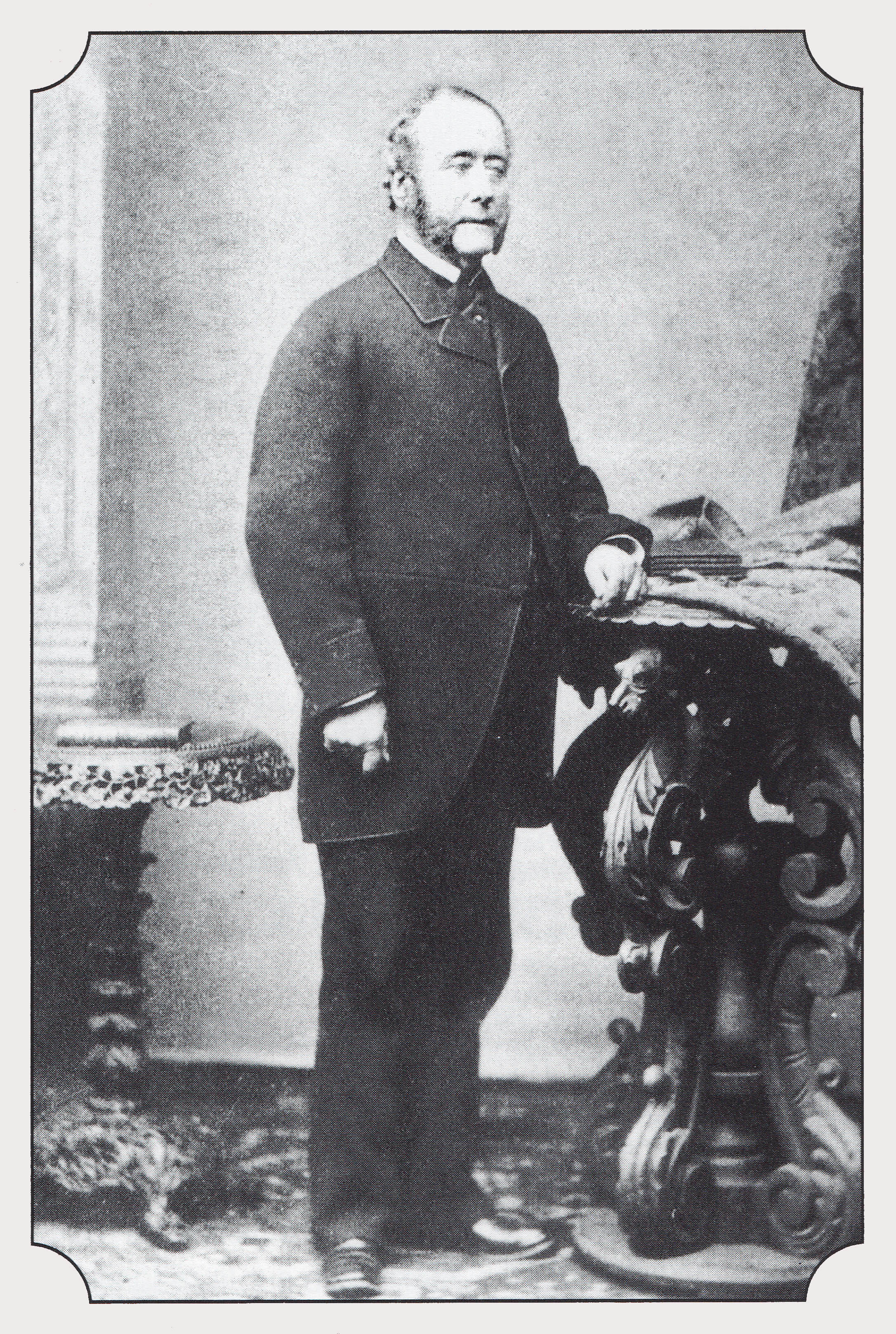
Alexander Taylor

Sir Alexander Taylor FRSE MRIA (1802–18 May 1879) was a 19th-century Scottish physician and author. He attended to the wounded in both sides during the Franco-Prussian War, and wrote a book which promoted the healthful climate of Pau.

== Early life and education ==
He was born in 1802 in Alton, Ayrshire, the son of William Taylor, a ship-owner. He studied medicine at the University of Edinburgh, gaining his doctorate (MD) in 1825.

== Medical career ==
In 1835 he served as Staff Surgeon to the English Auxiliary Force in Spain. In 1839 he settled in Pau in the Pyrenees and lived and worked there for the rest of his life.

In 1842 he published On the Curative Influence of the Climate of Pau, and the Mineral Waters of the Pyrenees, on Disease. The book did much to promote the town as a tourist destination. The climate was said to combat "Winter Depression" and respiratory disease and was first aimed at English-speaking countries, then translated into several European languages. Visitors coming as a result of his encouragement included Mary Todd Lincoln.

In 1846 he was elected a Fellow of the Royal Society of Edinburgh. His proposer was John Argyll Robertson. He was knighted by Queen Victoria in 1865.

In 1870 he did much to relieve the injured in Pau during the Franco-Prussian War. In this he aided the injured on both sides of the conflict.

== Later life, death and legacy ==
After the death of his wife Julia in June 1878, he lived in a boarding house on Rue Montpensier in Pau.

On Christmas Day 1878 a stained glass window was erected by him to the memory of his wife in the Protestant Church on Rue Serviez in Pau.

He died on 18 May 1879 at 5 Cayton Crescent in Hampstead during a visit to relatives in London. His body was returned to Pau and he was buried next to his wife in the municipal cemetery in the town.

Rue Alexander Taylor in Pau is named in his honour.

== Publications ==
- On the Curative Influence of the Climate of Pau, and the Mineral Waters of the Pyrenees, on Disease; with Descriptive Notices of the geology, botany, natural history, mountain sports, local antiquities, and topography of the Pyrenees, 1842
- De l'influence curative du climat de Pau et des Eaux Minérales des Pyrénées., 1843 French translation of 1842 edition.
- A comparative enquiry as to the preventative and curative influence of the Climate of Pau and of Montpellier, Hyères, Nice, Rome, Pisa, Florence, Naples, Biarritz, Etc. on Health and Disease […], 1856.
- Climate for Invalids; or, a comparative enquiry as to the preventative and curative influence of the Climate of Pau, and of Montpellier, Hyères, Nice, Rome, Pisa, Florence, Naples, Biarritz, Etc. on Health and Disease […], 1866 SECOND PRINTING OF 1861 edition with changes added in the Preface.
- Des climats propres aux malades ou Étude comparée de l'action préventive et curative du climat de Pau et des climats de Montpellier, Hyères, Nice, Rome, Pise, Florence, Naples, Biarritz, etc. Avec une description des établissements thermaux des Pyrénées, et l'indication des propriétés particulières à chaque source. 3e édition, revue et considérablement modifiée. Traduction de l'anglais 1865 French translation of 1861 edition
