= Alister Howden =

New Zealand cricketer (1877–1938)

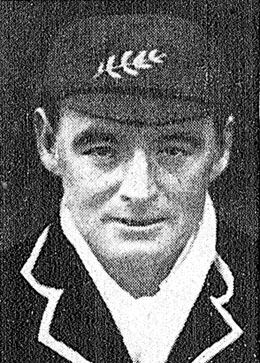
- Alister Howden in 1910

Personal information
- Full name: Alister MacDonald Howden
- Born: 20 August 1877; Rothesay, Bute, Scotland
- Died: 25 November 1938 (aged 61); Takapuna, Auckland, New Zealand
- Batting: Right-handed
- Bowling: Right-arm leg-spin
- Relatives: Ernest Howden (brother); Peter Howden (nephew)

Domestic team information
- Years: Team
- 1906/07–1914/15: Auckland

Career statistics
Competition	First-class
Matches	11
Runs scored	95
Batting average	7.91
100s/50s	0/0
Top score	29
Balls bowled	1,888
Wickets	53
Bowling average	18.00
5 wickets in innings	4
10 wickets in match	1
Best bowling	7/87
Catches/stumpings	5/–
- Source: Cricinfo, 1 November 2017

Alister MacDonald Howden (20 August 1877 – 25 November 1938) was a New Zealand cricketer. He played first-class cricket for Auckland between 1906 and 1914.

== Life and career ==
Howden was born in Scotland and moved to New Zealand with his family as a boy. After attending Otago Boys' High School he worked for the Bank of Australasia in Invercargill before taking other positions in financial institutions in New Zealand. He went into business as a grain and produce merchant in Auckland in the 1900s.

In 1908-09 Howden took 7 for 87 and 5 for 61 with his leg-spin to help Auckland retain the Plunket Shield against Otago, dismissing his brother Ernest in each innings. In January 1910, after Howden had taken six wickets against Canterbury and eight against Wellington to help Auckland retain the Shield, an Auckland cricket writer said: "it is the opinion of many experts that he is without exception the best bowler in New Zealand at present". He was selected in the first of the two matches New Zealand played against Australia later that season, but had no success.

Howden was also an accomplished golfer who won several local championships.

Howden died in November 1938, aged 61, survived by his wife and four sons. He left an estate worth 11,000 pounds. A short biography (containing family trees) titled Alister MacDonald Howden: A True Sportsman 1875-1938 was published in 2015.
