= Alastair Scott =

Alastair Scott may refer to:

- Alastair Scott (cricketer) (born 1966), former English cricketer
- Alastair Scott (politician) (born 1965), New Zealand member of the House of Representatives

== See also ==
- Alistair Scott (disambiguation)
