= Trusthorpe =

Small coastal village in the East Lindsey district of Lincolnshire, England

Coordinates: 53.325624°N 0.271220°E

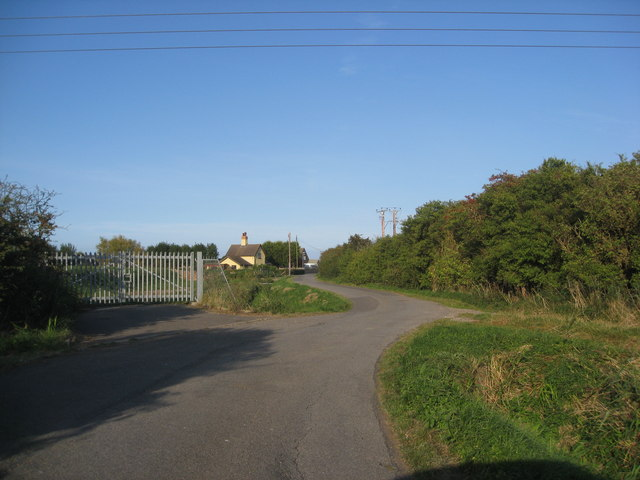
- North Road, Trusthorpe

- Location within Lincolnshire
- OS grid reference: TF523833
  - London: 130 mi (210 km) S
- Civil parish: Mablethorpe and Sutton
- District: East Lindsey
- Shire county: Lincolnshire
- Region: East Midlands
- Country: England
- Sovereign state: United Kingdom
- Post town: Louth
- Postcode district: LN12
- Police: Lincolnshire
- Fire: Lincolnshire
- Ambulance: East Midlands
- UK Parliament: Louth and Horncastle

Trusthorpe is a small coastal village in the civil parish of Mablethorpe and Sutton, in the East Lindsey district of Lincolnshire, England. It is situated 2 miles (3.2 km) south from Mablethorpe and 12 miles (19 km) north from Skegness. About 1 mile (1.6 km) to the west is the hamlet of Thorpe.

The parish church, St Peter's Church, is dedicated to Saint Peter and is Grade II listed, dating from the 14th century with alterations in 1522, 1606, 1842 and 1941. It is built of red brick with ashlar dressings, and the three stage tower has stepped corner buttresses. Just below the second stage is an ashlar datestone inscribed "1606 Anthone Swell." The nave dates from 1842 and the chancel from 1941; the font is 13th-century. At the east end of the nave is a wall monument to William Loft who died in 1854.

In 1964 a community facility, St Peter's Community Annexe, was built to provide local information and events. In 2014 the Annexe received a National Lottery grant for renovation works.

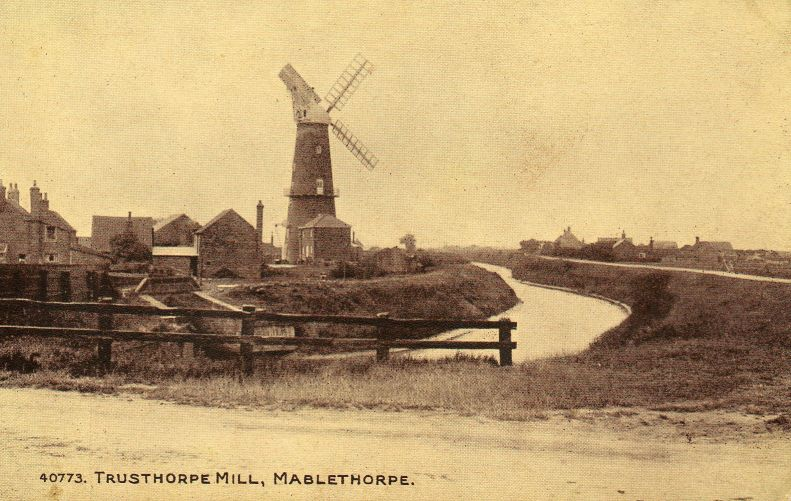
Trusthorpe Mill

Trusthorpe C of E School was built in 1856 in memory of William Loft, as a National School. It closed on 21 December 1927.

Trusthorpe windmill was originally erected at Newland, near Hull. Mr Charles Foster bought it and moved it to Trusthorpe where it was incorporated into a new mill. The post mill was demolished and replaced in 1901 when a new tower mill was built; this lasted until 1935 after which it was converted into a house.

== History ==
In 1961 the civil parish had a population of 436. On 1 October 1974 the parish was abolished to form "Mablethorpe and Sutton".

When Bolingbroke Castle was repaired for use of auditors of the Duchy of Lancaster working for Edward VI, lead for the roof of the gatehouse was brought from a chapel at Trusthorpe.
