= Sandilands, Lincolnshire =

Neighbourhood of Sutton-on-Sea, East Lindsey district, Lincolnshire, England

Coordinates: 53.299620°N 0.284717°E

Sandilands
- Location within Lincolnshire
- OS grid reference: TF523805
  - London: 125 mi (201 km) S
- Civil parish: Mablethorpe and Sutton
- District: East Lindsey
- Shire county: Lincolnshire
- Region: East Midlands
- Country: England
- Sovereign state: United Kingdom
- Post town: Mablethorpe
- Postcode district: LN12
- Police: Lincolnshire
- Fire: Lincolnshire
- Ambulance: East Midlands
- UK Parliament: Louth and Horncastle

Sandilands (once known as Sutton le Marsh) is a neighbourhood of Sutton-on-Sea, in the East Lindsey district of Lincolnshire, England. It forms part of the civil parish of Mablethorpe and Sutton.

== National Trust ==
The former golf course at Sandilands is now owned by the National Trust. It was previously an 18-hole links with a par of 70.

== Sport and Leisure ==
A family tennis tournament has been held in the first week of August every year since 1928, excepting 1939–1957. The tournament has taken place at the Grange and Links hotel and also on a number of private courts in the village in 2022.

== Gallery ==
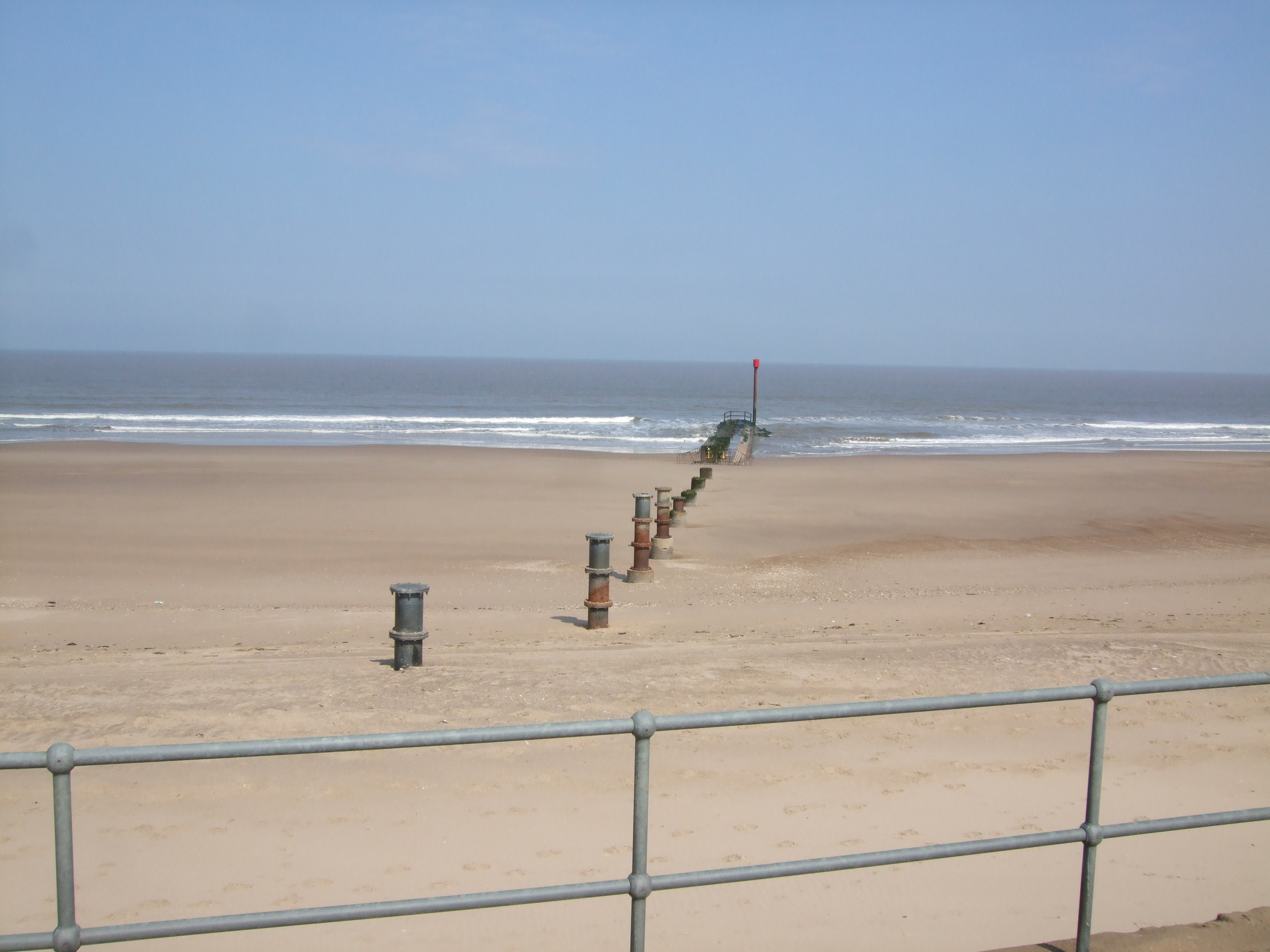
Sandilands beach

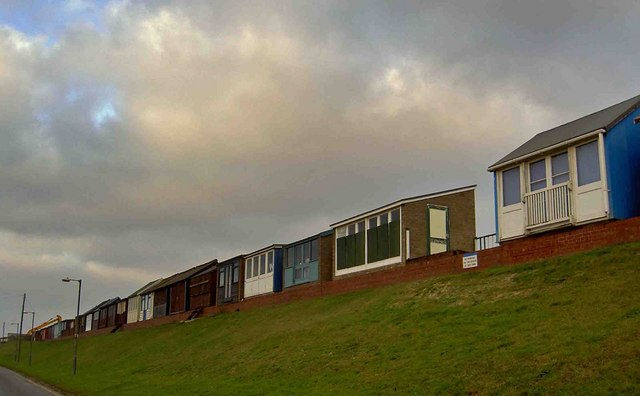
Beach huts on Roman Bank

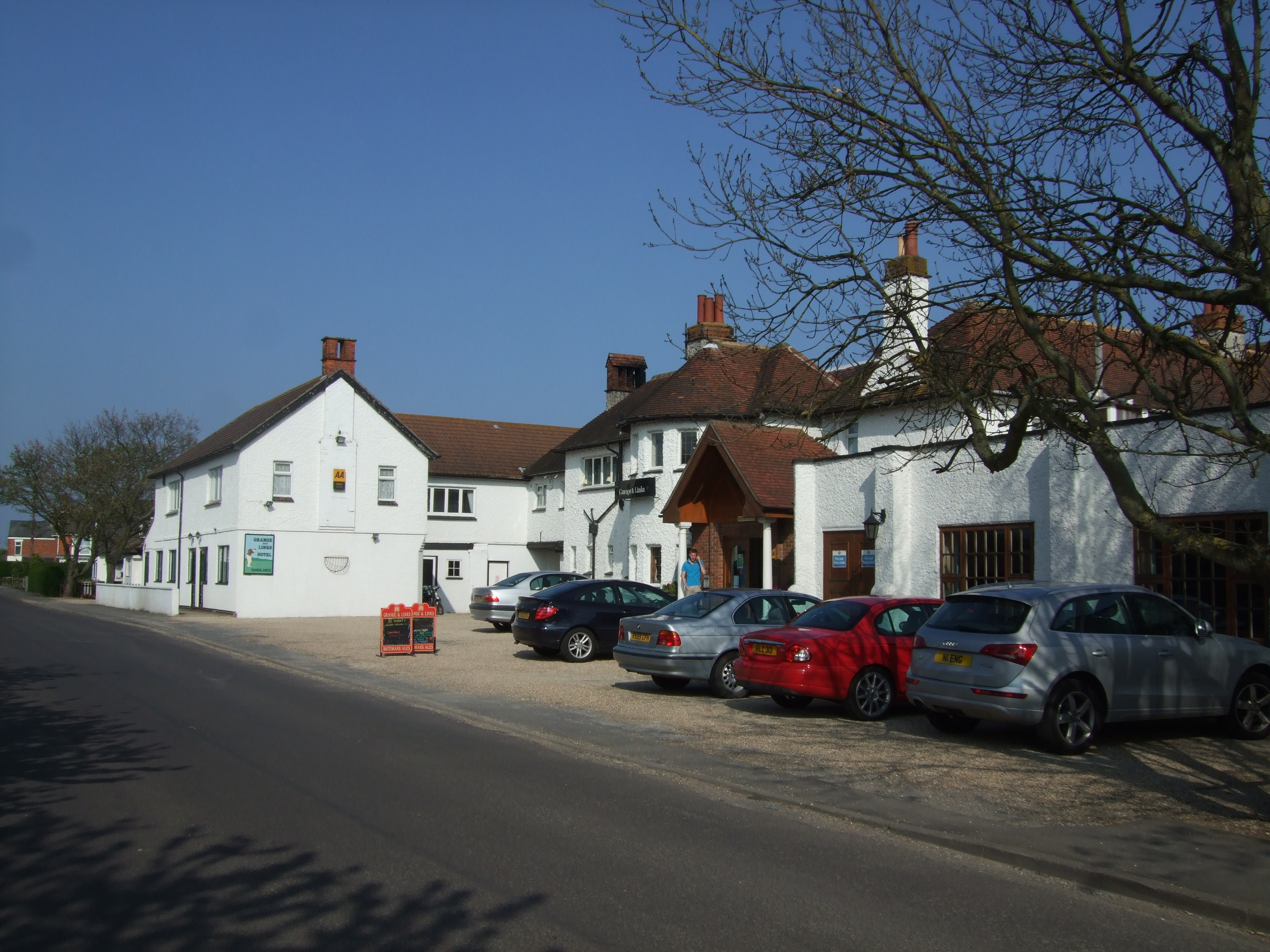
Grange and Links hotel
