= Mablethorpe and Sutton =

Civil parish in Lincolnshire, England

- Civil parish
- Interactive map of Mablethorpe and Sutton
- Coordinates: 53.332°N 0.239°E
- Country: England
- Primary council: East Lindsey
- County: Lincolnshire
- Region: East Midlands
- Status: Town
- Main settlements: Mablethorpe, Sutton-on-Sea, Trusthorpe, Sandilands, Thorpe

Government
  - Type: Town Council
  - UK Parliament: Louth and Horncastle

Population (2011)
  - Total: 12,531
- Website: Mablethorpe and Sutton Town Council

Mablethorpe and Sutton is a civil parish in East Lindsey, Lincolnshire, England. It is on the North Sea coast and includes Mablethorpe, Trusthorpe, Sutton-on-Sea and Sandilands along with the inland village of Thorpe. At the 2021 census it had a population of 12,669.

In 1894 the civil parish of Mablethorpe was included in Louth Rural District but in 1896 was created as Mablethorpe and Sutton Urban District in Lincolnshire, Parts of Lindsey. In 1925 it was joined in the urban district by the parishes of Sutton in the Marsh and Trusthope, from Spilsby Rural District and Louth Rural District respectively, and therefore changed its name.

Its urban district status was abolished by the Local Government Act 1972 in 1974, with the district authority becoming East Lindsey, whilst Mablethorpe and Sutton remained a civil parish with a town council.

== Demographics ==
Population of Mablethorpe and Sutton over time
Census	Population	Female	Male	Households	Source
2001	11,780	6,141	5,639	5,307	
2011	12,531	6,561	5,970	6,041	
2021	12,669	6,523	6,146	6,224	

Mablethorpe and Sutton: Ethnicity (2021 census)
Ethnic group	Population	%
White	12,461	98.4%
Asian or Asian British	83	0.7%
Mixed	74	0.6%
Black or Black British	24	0.2%
Other Ethnic Group	22	0.2%
Arab	4	0.1%

The religious composition of the ward at the 2021 census was recorded as:

Mablethorpe and Sutton: Religion (2021 census)
Religious	Population	%
Christian	6,954	58.9%
Irreligious	4,679	39.6%
Other religion	86	0.7%
Muslim	25	0.2%
Buddhist	24	0.2%
Hindu	21	0.2%
Jewish	11	0.1%
Sikh	6	0.1%

== Freedom of the Parish ==
The following people and military units have received the Freedom of the Parish of Mablethorpe and Sutton.

=== Individuals ===
- Jack Quinn: 9 November 2019.

== Arms ==
Coat of arms of Mablethorpe and Sutton Town Council

Notes
Granted 10th February 1960
Crest
Out of a mural crown Argent charged with three cross crosslets Sable a demi lion Gules gorged with a collar lozengy of the first and last
Escutcheon
Per fesse embattled Azure and Or in chief two White lilies slipped and leaved Proper the stalks conjoined and entwined with the shank of an anchor interlaced with the bows of two keys fessewise wards outwards and downwards Gold and in base three dolphins naiant of the first.
Motto
Amoeniora Litora Nostra (Our Shores Are More Delightful)

== See also ==
- Alford and Sutton Tramway
