= List of rural districts formed in England and Wales 1894–1974 =

Rural districts of England

This is a list of rural districts in England and Wales between 1894 and 1974. Rural districts were created by the Local Government Act 1894 in December 1894. They were formed from areas that had been rural sanitary districts. Their number varied over time as local government was reorganised and as part of a series of county review orders after the Local Government Act 1929. They were abolished by the Local Government Act 1972 in April 1974. They went on to form part of the districts of England and the districts of Wales.

Key to tables:

- 'UD' stands for urban district
- 'RD' stands for rural district
- 'MB' stands for municipal borough
- 'CB' stands for county borough

== 1894 ==
Initially 690 rural districts were created under the Local Government Act 1894.

Rural district	County	Created	Abolished	Successor(s)
Aethwy RD	Anglesey	1894	1974	Anglesey – Ynys Môn
Dwyran RD	Anglesey	1894	1933	absorbed by Aethwy RD
Twrcelyn RD	Anglesey	1894	1974	Anglesey – Ynys Môn
Valley RD	Anglesey	1894	1974	Anglesey – Ynys Môn
Bedford RD	Bedfordshire	1894	1974	Bedford
Biggleswade RD	Bedfordshire	1894	1974	Mid Bedfordshire
Eaton Bray RD	Bedfordshire	1894	1933	absorbed by Luton RD
Eaton Socon RD	Bedfordshire	1894	1934	absorbed by Bedford RD
Holwell RD	Bedfordshire	1894	1897	absorbed by Hitchin RD, Hertfordshire
Luton RD	Bedfordshire	1894	1974	South Bedfordshire
Woburn RD	Bedfordshire	1894	1900	absorbed by Ampthill RD and Eaton Bray RD
Ampthill RD	Bedfordshire and Hertfordshire (1894–97), Bedfordshire (1897–1974)	1894	1974	Mid Bedfordshire
Abingdon RD	Berkshire	1894	1974	Vale of White Horse
Bradfield RD	Berkshire	1894	1974	Newbury
Cookham RD	Berkshire	1894	1974	Windsor and Maidenhead
Easthampstead RD	Berkshire	1894	1974	Bracknell
Hungerford RD	Berkshire	1894	1974	Newbury
Newbury RD	Berkshire	1894	1974	Newbury
Wallingford RD	Berkshire	1894	1974	South Oxfordshire
Wantage RD	Berkshire	1894	1974	Vale of White Horse, Newbury
Windsor RD	Berkshire	1894	1974	Windsor and Maidenhead
Wokingham RD	Berkshire	1894	1974	Wokingham
Faringdon RD	Berkshire and Gloucestershire (1894–1935), Berkshire (1935–74)	1894	1974	Vale of White Horse
Brecknock RD	Brecknockshire	1894	1974	Brecknock
Builth RD	Brecknockshire	1894	1974	Brecknock
Crickhowell RD	Brecknockshire	1894	1974	Blaenau Gwent, Brecknock
Hay RD	Brecknockshire	1894	1974	Brecknock
Vaynor and Penderyn RD	Brecknockshire	1894	1974	Merthyr Tydfil, Brecknock, Cynon Valley
Ystradgynlais RD	Brecknockshire	1894	1974	Brecknock
Amersham RD	Buckinghamshire	1894	1974	Chiltern
Aylesbury RD	Buckinghamshire	1894	1974	Aylesbury Vale
Buckingham RD	Buckinghamshire	1894	1974	Aylesbury Vale
Eton RD	Buckinghamshire	1894	1974	Beaconsfield, Slough, Windsor and Maidenhead
Hambleden RD	Buckinghamshire	1894	1934	absorbed by Wycombe RD
Long Crendon RD	Buckinghamshire	1894	1934	absorbed by Aylesbury RD and Wycombe RD
Newport Pagnell RD	Buckinghamshire	1894	1974	Milton Keynes
Stratford and Wolverton RD	Buckinghamshire	1894	1919	Stratford and Wolverton UD
Wing RD	Buckinghamshire	1894	1974	Aylesbury Vale
Winslow RD	Buckinghamshire	1894	1974	Aylesbury Vale, Milton Keynes
Wycombe RD	Buckinghamshire and Oxfordshire (1894–96), Buckinghamshire (1896–1974)	1894	1974	Wycombe
Geirionydd RD	Caernarfonshire	1894	1934	Nant Conway RD
Glaslyn RD	Caernarfonshire	1894	1934	absorbed by Criccieth UD, Gwyrfai RD, Lleyn RD and Porthmadog UD
Gwyrfai RD	Caernarfonshire	1894	1974	Arfon, Dwyfor
Lleyn RD	Caernarfonshire	1894	1974	Dwyfor
Ogwen RD	Caernarfonshire	1894	1974	Arfon
Conway RD, Glan Conway RD	Caernarfonshire and Denbighshire (1894–1934)	1894	1934	Nant Conway RD, absorbed by Conway MB and Llandudno cum Eglwys Rhos UD
Linton RD	Cambridgeshire	1894	1934	South Cambridgeshire RD
Swavesey RD	Cambridgeshire	1894	1934	absorbed by Chesterton RD
Chesterton RD	Cambridgeshire (1894–1965), Cambridgeshire and Isle of Ely (1965–74)	1894	1974	South Cambridgeshire
Newmarket RD	Cambridgeshire (1894–1965), Cambridgeshire and Isle of Ely (1965–74)	1894	1974	East Cambridgeshire
Melbourn RD	Cambridgeshire and Essex (1894–95), Cambridgeshire (1895–1934)	1894	1934	South Cambridgeshire RD
Caxton and Arrington RD	Cambridgeshire and Huntingdonshire (1894–95), Cambridgeshire (1895–1934)	1894	1934	absorbed by Chesterton RD, South Cambridgeshire RD
Aberayron RD	Cardiganshire	1894	1974	Ceredigion
Aberystwyth RD	Cardiganshire	1894	1974	Ceredigion
Cardigan RD	Cardiganshire	1894	1934	Teifiside RD
Lampeter RD	Cardiganshire	1894	1934	absorbed by Aberayron RD
Llandyssil RD	Cardiganshire	1894	1934	Teifiside RD
Tregaron RD	Cardiganshire	1894	1974	Ceredigion
Carmarthen RD	Carmarthenshire	1894	1974	Carmarthen
Llandillofawr RD	Carmarthenshire	1894	1935	Llandilo RD, absorbed by Carmarthen RD and Llandeilo UD
Llandovery RD	Carmarthenshire	1894	1935	absorbed by Llandilo RD
Llanelly RD (1894–1966), Llanelli RD (1966–74)	Carmarthenshire	1894	1974	Llanelli
Llanybyther RD	Carmarthenshire	1894	1935	absorbed by Newcastle Emlyn RD
Newcastle in Emlyn RD (1894–1935), Newcastle Emlyn RD (1935–74)	Carmarthenshire	1894	1974	Carmarthen
Whitland RD	Carmarthenshire	1894	1935	absorbed by Carmarthen RD
Altrincham RD (1894–95), Bucklow RD (1895–1974)	Cheshire	1894	1974	Trafford, Manchester, Macclesfield
Chester RD	Cheshire	1894	1974	Chester
Congleton RD	Cheshire	1894	1974	Congleton
Disley RD	Cheshire	1894	1974	Macclesfield
Macclesfield RD	Cheshire	1894	1974	Macclesfield
Malpas RD	Cheshire	1894	1936	absorbed by Nantwich RD and Tarvin RD
Nantwich RD	Cheshire	1894	1974	Crewe and Nantwich
Northwich RD	Cheshire	1894	1974	Vale Royal
Runcorn RD	Cheshire	1894	1974	Vale Royal, Warrington, Halton
Stockport RD	Cheshire	1894	1904	Handforth UD
Tarvin RD	Cheshire	1894	1974	Chester
Tintwistle RD	Cheshire	1894	1974	High Peak
Tittenley RD	Cheshire	1894	1895	absorbed by Drayton RD, Shropshire
Wirral RD	Cheshire	1894	1933	absorbed by Bebington UD, Birkenhead CB, Ellesmere Port UD, Hoylake UD, Neston UD, Wallasey CB and Wirral UD
Bodmin RD	Cornwall	1894	1934	absorbed by Bodmin MB, Liskeard RD, Lostwithiel MB, St Austell RD and Wadebridge RD
Calstock RD	Cornwall	1894	1934	absorbed by St Germans RD
Camelford RD	Cornwall	1894	1974	North Cornwall
East Kerrier RD	Cornwall	1894	1934	Kerrier RD, absorbed by Falmouth MB, Penryn MB and Truro RD
Helston RD	Cornwall	1894	1934	Camborne-Redruth UD and Kerrier RD, absorbed by Helston MB
Isles of Scilly RD	Cornwall	1894	1974	Isles of Scilly
Launceston RD	Cornwall	1894	1974	North Cornwall
Liskeard RD	Cornwall	1894	1974	Caradon
Redruth RD	Cornwall	1894	1934	Camborne-Redruth UD and Kerrier RD, absorbed by Truro RD and West Penwith RD
St Austell RD	Cornwall	1894	1974	Restormel
St Columb Major RD	Cornwall	1894	1934	Wadebridge RD, absorbed by Newquay UD, Padstow UD, St Austell RD and Truro RD
St Germans RD	Cornwall	1894	1974	Caradon
Stratton RD	Cornwall	1894	1974	North Cornwall
Truro RD	Cornwall	1894	1974	Carrick
West Penwith RD	Cornwall	1894	1974	Penwith
Auckland RD	County Durham	1894	1937	absorbed by Barnard Castle RD, Bishop Auckland UD, Crook and Willington UD, Darlington RD, Sedgefield RD, Shildon UD, Spennymoor UD and Weardale RD
Barnard Castle RD	County Durham	1894	1974	Teesdale
Chester-le-Street RD	County Durham	1894	1974	Sunderland, Gateshead, Chester-le-Street
Darlington RD	County Durham	1894	1974	Darlington, Sunderland
Durham RD	County Durham	1894	1974	Durham
Easington RD	County Durham	1894	1974	Easington, Sunderland
Hartlepool RD	County Durham	1894	1937	absorbed by Stockton RD
Houghton le Spring RD	County Durham	1894	1937	absorbed by Durham RD, Easington RD, Hetton UD and Houghton-le-Spring UD
Lanchester RD	County Durham	1894	1974	Derwentside
Sedgefield RD	County Durham	1894	1974	Sedgefield
South Shields RD	County Durham	1894	1936	Boldon UD, absorbed by Felling UD, Hebburn UD, Jarrow MB and South Shields CB
Stockton RD	County Durham	1894	1974	Stockton-on-Tees, Hartlepool
Sunderland RD	County Durham	1894	1967	absorbed by Houghton-le-Spring UD, Seaham UD, Sunderland CB and Washington UD
Weardale RD	County Durham	1894	1974	Wear Valley
Alston Moor RD, Alston with Garrigill RD	Cumberland	1894	1974	Eden
Bootle RD	Cumberland	1894	1934	Ennerdale RD and Millom RD
Brampton RD	Cumberland	1894	1934	Border RD, absorbed by Penrith RD
Carlisle RD	Cumberland	1894	1934	Border RD, absorbed by Penrith RD
Cockermouth RD	Cumberland	1894	1974	Allerdale
Longtown RD	Cumberland	1894	1934	Border RD
Penrith RD	Cumberland	1894	1974	Eden
Whitehaven RD	Cumberland	1894	1934	Ennerdale RD and Millom RD, absorbed by Whitehaven MB
Wigton RD	Cumberland	1894	1974	Allerdale
Chirk RD	Denbighshire	1894	1935	Ceiriog RD
Llangollen RD	Denbighshire	1894	1935	absorbed by Ruthin RD and Wrexham RD
Llanrwst RD	Denbighshire	1894	1935	Hiraethog RD, absorbed by Llanrwst UD
Llansillin RD	Denbighshire	1894	1935	Ceiriog RD
Ruthin RD	Denbighshire	1894	1974	Glyndŵr
St Asaph (Denbigh) RD	Denbighshire	1894	1935	Abergele UD and Aled RD
Uwchaled RD	Denbighshire	1894	1935	Hiraethog RD
Wrexham RD	Denbighshire	1894	1974	Wrexham Maelor, Glyndŵr
Appleby RD	Derbyshire	1894	1897	absorbed by Ashby de la Zouch RD, Leicestershire
Ashbourne RD	Derbyshire	1894	1974	West Derbyshire
Bakewell RD	Derbyshire	1894	1974	West Derbyshire
Belper RD	Derbyshire	1894	1974	Amber Valley
Blackwell RD	Derbyshire	1894	1974	Bolsover
Chapel en le Frith RD	Derbyshire	1894	1974	High Peak
Chesterfield RD	Derbyshire	1894	1974	Chesterfield, North East Derbyshire
Clowne RD	Derbyshire	1894	1974	Bolsover
Croxall RD	Derbyshire	1894	1895	absorbed by Tamworth RD, Staffordshire
Glossop Dale RD	Derbyshire	1894	1934	absorbed by Chapel en le Frith RD and Glossop MB
Hartshorn and Seals RD	Derbyshire	1894	1934	absorbed by Repton RD and Swadlincote UD
Hayfield RD	Derbyshire	1894	1934	absorbed by Chapel en le Frith RD
Norton RD	Derbyshire	1894	1934	absorbed by Chesterfield RD and Sheffield CB, West Riding of Yorkshire
Repton RD	Derbyshire	1894	1974	South Derbyshire
Sudbury RD	Derbyshire	1894	1934	absorbed by Ashbourne RD
Shardlow RD	Derbyshire and Nottinghamshire (1894–1927), Derbyshire (1927–59)	1894	1959	South East Derbyshire RD
Axminster RD	Devon	1894	1974	East Devon
Barnstaple RD	Devon	1894	1974	North Devon
Bideford RD	Devon	1894	1974	Torridge
Broadwoodwidger RD	Devon	1894	1966	absorbed by Holsworthy RD and Launceston RD, Cornwall
Crediton RD	Devon	1894	1974	Tiverton
Culmstock RD	Devon	1894	1935	absorbed by Tiverton RD
Honiton RD	Devon	1894	1974	East Devon
Kingsbridge RD	Devon	1894	1974	South Hams
Newton Abbot RD	Devon	1894	1974	Teignbridge
Okehampton RD	Devon	1894	1974	West Devon
Plympton St Mary RD	Devon	1894	1974	South Hams
South Molton RD	Devon	1894	1974	North Devon
St Thomas RD	Devon	1894	1974	South Hams
Tavistock RD	Devon	1894	1974	West Devon
Tiverton RD	Devon	1894	1974	Tiverton
Torrington RD	Devon	1894	1974	Torridge
Totnes RD	Devon	1894	1974	South Hams
Holsworthy RD	Devon and Cornwall (1894–1934), Devon (1934–74)	1894	1974	Torridge
Blandford RD	Dorset	1894	1974	North Dorset
Bridport RD	Dorset	1894	1974	West Dorset
Cerne RD	Dorset	1894	1933	absorbed by Dorchester RD, Sherborne RD and Sturminster RD
Dorchester RD	Dorset	1894	1974	West Dorset
Poole RD	Dorset	1894	1933	absorbed by Poole MB, Wareham and Purbeck RD and Wimborne and Cranborne RD
Shaftesbury RD	Dorset	1894	1974	North Dorset
Sherborne RD	Dorset	1894	1974	West Dorset
Sturminster RD	Dorset	1894	1974	North Dorset
Wareham and Purbeck RD	Dorset	1894	1974	Purbeck
Weymouth RD	Dorset	1894	1933	absorbed by Dorchester RD and Weymouth and Melcombe Regis MB
Wimborne and Cranborne RD	Dorset	1894	1974	Wimborne
Beaminster RD	Dorset and Somerset (1894–95), Dorset (1895–1974)	1894	1974	West Dorset
Beverley RD	East Riding of Yorkshire	1894	1974	Beverley
Bridlington RD	East Riding of Yorkshire	1894	1974	North Wolds, Scarborough
Driffield RD	East Riding of Yorkshire	1894	1974	North Wolds
Escrick RD	East Riding of Yorkshire	1894	1935	Derwent RD, absorbed by Pocklington RD
Howden RD	East Riding of Yorkshire	1894	1974	Boothferry
Norton RD	East Riding of Yorkshire	1894	1974	Ryedale
Patrington RD	East Riding of Yorkshire	1894	1935	Holderness RD
Pocklington RD	East Riding of Yorkshire	1894	1974	North Wolds
Riccal RD	East Riding of Yorkshire	1894	1935	Derwent RD, absorbed by Howden RD
Sculcoates RD	East Riding of Yorkshire	1894	1935	Haltemprice UD and Holderness RD, absorbed by Beverley RD, Hedon MB and Kingston upon Hull CB
Sherburn RD	East Riding of Yorkshire	1894	1935	absorbed by Bridlington RD, Filey UD and Norton RD
Skirlaugh RD	East Riding of Yorkshire	1894	1935	Holderness RD, absorbed by Kingston upon Hull CB
Blything RD	East Suffolk	1894	1934	Blyth RD, Lothingland RD and Wainford RD, absorbed by Halesworth UD, Leiston-cum-Sizewell UD and Southwold MB
Bosmere and Claydon RD	East Suffolk	1894	1934	Deben RD and Gipping RD, absorbed by Ipswich CB
East Stow RD	East Suffolk	1894	1934	Gipping RD, absorbed by Stowmarket UD
Hartismere RD	East Suffolk	1894	1974	Mid Suffolk
Hoxne RD	East Suffolk	1894	1934	Blyth RD, absorbed by Hartismere RD
Mutford and Lothingland RD	East Suffolk	1894	1934	Lothingland RD, absorbed by Lowestoft MB
Plomesgate RD	East Suffolk	1894	1934	Blyth RD and Deben RD, absorbed by Aldeburgh MB and Hartismere RD
Samford RD	East Suffolk	1894	1974	Babergh
Wangford RD	East Suffolk	1894	1934	Wainford RD
Woodbridge RD	East Suffolk	1894	1934	Deben RD, absorbed by Ipswich CB
Battle RD	East Sussex	1894	1974	Rother
Chailey RD	East Sussex	1894	1974	Lewes
Eastbourne RD	East Sussex	1894	1934	absorbed by Hailsham RD and Seaford UD
Hailsham RD	East Sussex	1894	1974	Wealden
Hastings RD	East Sussex	1894	1934	absorbed by Battle RD
Newhaven RD	East Sussex	1894	1934	absorbed by Chailey RD, Newhaven UD, Lewes MB and Seaford UD
Steyning East RD	East Sussex	1894	1928	absorbed by Cuckfield RD and Hove MB
Ticehurst RD	East Sussex	1894	1934	absorbed by Battle RD and Uckfield RD
Uckfield RD	East Sussex	1894	1974	Wealden
Rye RD	East Sussex and Kent (1894–95), East Sussex (1895–1934)	1894	1934	absorbed by Battle RD and Rye MB
East Grinstead RD	East Sussex and Surrey (1894–97), East Sussex (1897–1934)	1894	1934	absorbed by Cuckfield RD, East Grinstead UD and Uckfield RD
Cuckfield RD	East Sussex and West Sussex (1894–1908), East Sussex (1908–74)	1894	1974	Mid Sussex, Crawley
Belchamp RD	Essex	1894	1934	absorbed by Halstead RD
Billericay RD	Essex	1894	1934	Billericay UD, absorbed by Brentwood UD and Chelmsford RD
Braintree RD	Essex	1894	1974	Braintree
Bumpstead RD	Essex	1894	1934	absorbed by Halstead RD
Chelmsford RD	Essex	1894	1974	Chelmsford, Brentwood
Dunmow RD	Essex	1894	1974	Uttlesford
Epping RD	Essex	1894	1955	Epping and Ongar RD and Harlow UD
Halstead RD	Essex	1894	1974	Braintree
Lexden and Winstree RD	Essex	1894	1974	Colchester
Maldon RD	Essex	1894	1974	Maldon
Ongar RD	Essex	1894	1955	Epping and Ongar RD
Orsett RD	Essex	1894	1936	Thurrock UD
Rochford RD	Essex	1894	1974	Rochford
Romford RD	Essex	1894	1934	absorbed by Brentwood UD, Hornchurch UD and Romford MB
Royston RD	Essex	1894	1895	absorbed by Melbourn RD
Saffron Walden RD	Essex	1894	1974	Uttlesford
Stansted RD	Essex	1894	1934	absorbed by Dunmow RD and Saffron Walden RD
Tendring RD	Essex	1894	1974	Tendring
Hawarden RD	Flintshire	1894	1974	Wrexham Maelor, Alyn and Deeside
Holywell RD	Flintshire	1894	1974	Delyn
Overton RD (1894–1953), Maelor RD (1953–74)	Flintshire	1894	1974	Wrexham Maelor
St Asaph (Flint) RD (1894–1934), St Asaph RD (1934–74)	Flintshire	1894	1974	Rhuddlan
Cowbridge RD	Glamorganshire	1894	1974	Taff-Ely, Vale of Glamorgan
Gelligaer and Rhigos RD	Glamorganshire	1894	1908	Gelligaer UD, absorbed by Neath RD
Gower RD	Glamorganshire	1894	1974	Swansea
Llandaff and Dinas Powis RD (1894–1922), Cardiff RD (1922–74)	Glamorganshire	1894	1974	Vale of Glamorgan, Cardiff, Rhymney Valley, Taff-Ely
Llantrisant and Llantwitfardre RD	Glamorganshire	1894	1974	Taff-Ely
Penybont RD	Glamorganshire	1894	1974	Ogwr
Pontardawe RD	Glamorganshire	1894	1974	Lliw Valley
Swansea RD	Glamorganshire	1894	1930	Llwchwr UD
Neath RD	Glamorganshire and Brecknockshire (1894–1934), Glamorganshire (1934–74)	1894	1974	Neath, Cynon Valley
Barton Regis RD	Gloucestershire	1894	1904	absorbed by Chipping Sodbury RD, Bristol CB and Thornbury RD
Campden RD	Gloucestershire	1894	1935	North Cotswold RD, absorbed by Stratford on Avon RD, Warwickshire
Cheltenham RD	Gloucestershire	1894	1974	Tewkesbury
Chipping Sodbury RD	Gloucestershire	1894	1935	Sodbury RD, absorbed by Tetbury RD, Thornbury RD and Warmley RD
Dursley RD	Gloucestershire	1894	1974	Stroud
East Dean and United Parishes RD	Gloucestershire	1894	1935	East Dean RD, absorbed by Gloucester RD and West Dean RD
Gloucester RD	Gloucestershire	1894	1974	Stroud, Forest of Dean, Tewkesbury
Lydney RD	Gloucestershire	1894	1974	Forest of Dean
Marston Sicca RD	Gloucestershire	1894	1931	absorbed by Stratford on Avon RD, Warwickshire
Northleach RD	Gloucestershire	1894	1974	Cotswold
Pebworth RD	Gloucestershire	1894	1931	absorbed by Campden RD and Evesham RD, Worcestershire
Stroud RD	Gloucestershire	1894	1974	Stroud
Thornbury RD	Gloucestershire	1894	1974	Northavon, Stroud
Warmley RD	Gloucestershire	1894	1974	Kingswood
West Dean RD	Gloucestershire	1894	1974	Forest of Dean
Wheatenhurst RD	Gloucestershire	1894	1935	absorbed by Gloucester RD
Tetbury RD	Gloucestershire and Wiltshire (1894–1930), Gloucestershire (1930–74)	1894	1974	Cotswold
Cirencester RD	Gloucestershire and Wiltshire (1894–97), Gloucestershire (1897–1974)	1894	1974	Cotswold
Stow on the Wold RD	Gloucestershire and Worcestershire (1894–1931), Gloucestershire (1931–35)	1894	1935	North Cotswold RD, absorbed by Northleach RD
Newent RD	Gloucestershire and Worcestershire (1894–1931), Gloucestershire (1931–74)	1894	1974	Forest of Dean
Tewkesbury RD	Gloucestershire and Worcestershire (1894–1933), Gloucestershire (1933–35)	1894	1935	absorbed by Cheltenham RD, Gloucester RD and Tewkesbury MB
Winchcombe RD	Gloucestershire and Worcestershire (1894–1933), Gloucestershire (1933–35)	1894	1935	North Cotswold RD, absorbed by Cheltenham RD
Alresford RD	Hampshire	1894	1932	absorbed by Alton RD, Droxford RD and Winchester RD
Alton RD	Hampshire	1894	1974	East Hampshire
Andover RD	Hampshire	1894	1974	Test Valley
Basingstoke RD	Hampshire	1894	1974	Basingstoke
Catherington RD	Hampshire	1894	1932	absorbed by Droxford RD, Havant UD and Petersfield RD
Christchurch RD	Hampshire	1894	1932	absorbed by Christchurch MB and Ringwood and Fordingbridge RD
Dockenfield RD	Hampshire	1894	1895	absorbed by Farnham RD, Surrey
Droxford RD	Hampshire	1894	1974	Winchester
Fareham RD	Hampshire	1894	1932	absorbed by Droxford RD, Fareham UD, Gosport MB, Havant UD and Portsmouth CB
Hartley Wintney RD	Hampshire	1894	1974	Hart
Havant RD	Hampshire	1894	1932	absorbed by Droxford RD, Havant UD, Petersfield RD and Portsmouth CB
Hursley RD	Hampshire	1894	1932	Romsey and Stockbridge RD, absorbed by Eastleigh UD, Winchester RD and Winchester MB
Kingsclere RD	Hampshire	1894	1932	Kingsclere and Whitchurch RD
Lymington RD	Hampshire	1894	1932	absorbed by Lymington MB and New Forest RD
New Forest RD	Hampshire	1894	1974	New Forest
Portsea Island RD	Hampshire	1894	1895	absorbed by Portsmouth CB
Ringwood RD	Hampshire	1894	1932	Ringwood and Fordingbridge RD
South Stoneham RD	Hampshire	1894	1932	Romsey and Stockbridge RD, absorbed by Eastleigh UD and Winchester RD
Stockbridge RD	Hampshire	1894	1932	Romsey and Stockbridge RD
Whitchurch RD	Hampshire	1894	1932	Kingsclere and Whitchurch RD
Petersfield RD	Hampshire and West Sussex (1894–95), Hampshire (1895–1974)	1894	1974	East Hampshire
Fordingbridge RD	Hampshire and Wiltshire (1894–95), Hampshire (1895–1932)	1894	1932	Ringwood and Fordingbridge RD
Romsey RD	Hampshire and Wiltshire (1894–95), Hampshire (1895–1932)	1894	1932	Romsey and Stockbridge RD, absorbed by Romsey MB
Bredwardine RD	Herefordshire	1894	1934	Dore and Bredwardine RD, absorbed by Kington RD
Dore RD	Herefordshire	1894	1934	Dore and Bredwardine RD
Hereford RD	Herefordshire	1894	1974	South Herefordshire
Kington RD	Herefordshire	1894	1974	Leominster
Ledbury RD	Herefordshire	1894	1974	Malvern Hills
Leominster RD	Herefordshire	1894	1930	Leominster and Wigmore RD
Ross RD	Herefordshire	1894	1931	Ross and Whitchurch RD
Weobley RD	Herefordshire	1894	1974	Leominster
Whitchurch RD	Herefordshire	1894	1931	Ross and Whitchurch RD
Wigmore RD	Herefordshire	1894	1930	Leominster and Wigmore RD
Bromyard RD	Herefordshire and Worcestershire (1894–97), Herefordshire (1897–1974)	1894	1974	Malvern Hills
Ashwell RD	Hertfordshire	1894	1935	Braughing RD, absorbed by Hitchin RD and Royston UD
Barnet RD (1894–1941), Elstree RD (1941–74)	Hertfordshire	1894	1974	Hertsmere
Berkhampstead RD (1894–1937), Berkhamsted RD (1937–74)	Hertfordshire	1894	1974	Dacorum
Bishop's Stortford RD (1894–95), Hadham RD (1895–1935)	Hertfordshire	1894	1935	Braughing RD, absorbed by Bishop's Stortford UD and Ware RD
Buntingford RD	Hertfordshire	1894	1935	Braughing RD, absorbed by Hitchin RD
Hatfield RD	Hertfordshire	1894	1974	Welwyn Hatfield
Hemel Hempstead RD	Hertfordshire	1894	1974	Dacorum
Hertford RD	Hertfordshire	1894	1974	Stevenage, East Hertfordshire
Kensworth RD	Hertfordshire	1894	1897	absorbed by Hemel Hempstead RD and Luton RD, Bedfordshire
St Albans RD	Hertfordshire	1894	1974	St Albans, Dacorum
Studham RD	Hertfordshire	1894	1897	absorbed by Luton RD, Bedfordshire
Ware RD	Hertfordshire	1894	1974	East Hertfordshire
Watford RD	Hertfordshire	1894	1974	Hertsmere, Dacorum, Three Rivers
Welwyn RD	Hertfordshire	1894	1974	Welwyn Hatfield
Hitchin RD	Hertfordshire and Bedfordshire (1894–97), Hertfordshire (1897–1974)	1894	1974	North Hertfordshire
Huntingdon RD	Huntingdonshire (1894–1965), Huntingdon and Peterborough (1965–74)	1894	1974	Huntingdon
Norman Cross RD	Huntingdonshire (1894–1965), Huntingdon and Peterborough (1965–74)	1894	1974	Huntingdon, Peterborough
St Ives RD	Huntingdonshire (1894–1965), Huntingdon and Peterborough (1965–74)	1894	1974	Huntingdon
St Neots RD	Huntingdonshire (1894–1965), Huntingdon and Peterborough (1965–74)	1894	1974	Huntingdon
West Welney RD	Isle of Ely	1894	1895	absorbed by Downham RD, Norfolk
Whittlesey RD	Isle of Ely	1894	1926	absorbed by Whittlesey UD
Ely RD	Isle of Ely (1894–1965), Cambridgeshire and Isle of Ely (1965–74)	1894	1974	East Cambridgeshire
North Witchford RD	Isle of Ely (1894–1965), Cambridgeshire and Isle of Ely (1965–74)	1894	1974	Fenland
Wisbech RD	Isle of Ely (1894–1965), Cambridgeshire and Isle of Ely (1965–74)	1894	1974	Fenland
Thorney RD	Isle of Ely (1894–1965), Huntingdon and Peterborough (1965–74)	1894	1974	Peterborough
Isle of Wight RD	Isle of Wight	1894	1974	South Wight
Blean RD	Kent	1894	1934	Bridge-Blean RD, absorbed by Canterbury CB, Herne Bay UD and Whitstable UD
Bridge RD	Kent	1894	1934	Bridge-Blean RD, absorbed by Canterbury CB and Dover RD
Bromley RD	Kent	1894	1934	Chislehurst and Sidcup UD and Orpington UD, absorbed by Bromley MB and Beckenham UD
Cranbrook RD	Kent	1894	1974	Tunbridge Wells
Dartford RD	Kent	1894	1974	Sevenoaks, Dartford
Dover RD	Kent	1894	1974	Dover
East Ashford RD	Kent	1894	1974	Ashford
Eastry RD	Kent	1894	1974	Dover, Thanet
Elham RD	Kent	1894	1974	Shepway
Faversham RD	Kent	1894	1934	Bridge-Blean RD and Swale RD, absorbed by East Ashford RD, West Ashford RD and Whitstable UD
Hollingbourne RD	Kent	1894	1974	Maidstone
Hoo RD	Kent	1894	1935	absorbed by Strood RD
Isle of Thanet RD	Kent	1894	1935	absorbed by Broadstairs and St Peter's UD, Eastry RD, Margate MB, Ramsgate MB and Sandwich MB
Maidstone RD	Kent	1894	1974	Maidstone
Malling RD	Kent	1894	1974	Tonbridge and Malling
Medway RD	Kent	1894	1905	absorbed by Malling RD
Milton RD	Kent	1894	1935	Swale RD
Romney Marsh RD	Kent	1894	1974	Shepway
Sevenoaks RD	Kent	1894	1974	Sevenoaks
Sheppey RD	Kent	1894	1968	Queenborough in Sheppey MB
Strood RD	Kent	1894	1974	Rochester-upon-Medway, Gravesham
Tenterden RD	Kent	1894	1974	Ashford
West Ashford RD	Kent	1894	1974	Ashford
Tonbridge RD	Kent and East Sussex (1894–95), Kent (1895–1974)	1894	1974	Tunbridge Wells, Tonbridge and Malling
Barton upon Irwell RD	Lancashire	1894	1933	absorbed by Eccles MB, Kearsley UD, Stretford MB, Swinton and Pendlebury UD, Urmston UD and Worsley UD
Blackburn RD	Lancashire	1894	1974	Hyndburn, Blackburn, Ribble Valley
Bolton RD	Lancashire	1894	1898	absorbed by Bolton CB, Turton UD and Westhoughton UD
Burnley RD	Lancashire	1894	1974	Pendle, Ribble Valley, Burnley
Bury RD	Lancashire	1894	1933	absorbed by Heywood MB, Radcliffe UD, Ramsbottom UD and Rochdale CB
Chorley RD	Lancashire	1894	1974	Chorley
Clitheroe RD	Lancashire	1894	1974	Ribble Valley
Dalton RD	Lancashire	1894	1895	absorbed by South Westmorland RD, Westmorland
Fylde RD	Lancashire	1894	1974	Fylde
Garstang RD	Lancashire	1894	1974	Wyre
Lancaster RD	Lancashire	1894	1974	Lancaster
Leigh RD	Lancashire	1894	1933	absorbed by Golborne UD and Tyldesley UD
Limehurst RD	Lancashire	1894	1954	absorbed by Ashton-under-Lyne MB, Droylsden UD, Failsworth UD, Mossley MB and Oldham CB
Lunesdale RD	Lancashire	1894	1974	Lancaster
Preston RD	Lancashire	1894	1974	South Ribble, Preston, Ribble Valley
Sefton RD	Lancashire	1894	1932	absorbed by West Lancashire RD
Ulverston RD (1894–1960), North Lonsdale RD (1960–74)	Lancashire	1894	1974	South Lakeland
Warrington RD	Lancashire	1894	1974	Warrington
West Lancashire RD	Lancashire	1894	1974	Sefton, Knowsley, West Lancashire
Whiston RD	Lancashire	1894	1974	Warrington, St Helens, Knowsley, Halton
Wigan RD	Lancashire	1894	1974	Wigan, West Lancashire
Barrow upon Soar RD	Leicestershire	1894	1974	Charnwood
Belvoir RD	Leicestershire	1894	1935	Melton and Belvoir RD
Billesdon RD	Leicestershire	1894	1974	Harborough
Blaby RD	Leicestershire	1894	1974	Blaby
Castle Donington RD	Leicestershire	1894	1974	North West Leicestershire
Hallaton RD	Leicestershire	1894	1935	absorbed by Market Harborough RD
Hinckley RD	Leicestershire	1894	1936	absorbed by Atherstone RD, Warwickshire, Blaby RD, Hinckley UD, Market Bosworth RD and Nuneaton MB, Warwickshire
Loughborough RD	Leicestershire	1894	1936	absorbed by Barrow upon Soar RD, Castle Donington RD, Coalville UD and Shepshed UD
Lutterworth RD	Leicestershire	1894	1974	Harborough
Market Bosworth RD	Leicestershire	1894	1974	North West Leicestershire, Hinckley and Bosworth
Market Harborough RD	Leicestershire	1894	1974	Harborough
Melton Mowbray RD	Leicestershire	1894	1935	Melton and Belvoir RD, absorbed by Melton Mowbray UD
Ashby de la Zouch RD	Leicestershire and Derbyshire (1894–97), Leicestershire (1897–1974)	1894	1974	North West Leicestershire
Boston RD	Lincolnshire, Parts of Holland	1894	1974	Boston
Crowland RD	Lincolnshire, Parts of Holland	1894	1932	absorbed by Spalding RD
East Elloe RD	Lincolnshire, Parts of Holland	1894	1974	South Holland
Spalding RD	Lincolnshire, Parts of Holland and Parts of Kesteven (1894–1930), Lincolnshire, Parts of Holland (1930–74)	1894	1974	South Holland
Bourne RD	Lincolnshire, Parts of Kesteven	1894	1931	South Kesteven RD
Branston RD	Lincolnshire, Parts of Kesteven	1894	1931	North Kesteven RD
Claypole RD	Lincolnshire, Parts of Kesteven	1894	1931	North Kesteven RD and West Kesteven RD
Grantham RD	Lincolnshire, Parts of Kesteven	1894	1931	East Kesteven RD and West Kesteven RD
Sleaford RD	Lincolnshire, Parts of Kesteven	1894	1931	East Kesteven RD, North Kesteven RD and West Kesteven RD
Uffington RD	Lincolnshire, Parts of Kesteven	1894	1931	South Kesteven RD
Caistor RD	Lincolnshire, Parts of Lindsey	1894	1974	West Lindsey
Gainsborough RD	Lincolnshire, Parts of Lindsey	1894	1974	West Lindsey
Glanford Brigg RD	Lincolnshire, Parts of Lindsey	1894	1974	Glanford
Grimsby RD	Lincolnshire, Parts of Lindsey	1894	1974	Cleethorpes
Horncastle RD	Lincolnshire, Parts of Lindsey	1894	1974	East Lindsey
Isle of Axholme RD	Lincolnshire, Parts of Lindsey	1894	1974	Boothferry
Louth RD	Lincolnshire, Parts of Lindsey	1894	1974	East Lindsey
Sibsey RD	Lincolnshire, Parts of Lindsey	1894	1936	absorbed by Spilsby RD
Spilsby RD	Lincolnshire, Parts of Lindsey	1894	1974	East Lindsey
Welton RD	Lincolnshire, Parts of Lindsey	1894	1974	West Lindsey
Deudraeth RD	Merionethshire	1894	1974	Meirionnydd
Edeirnion RD	Merionethshire	1894	1974	Glyndŵr
Penllyn RD	Merionethshire	1894	1974	Meirionnydd
Dolgelly RD (1894–1958), Dolgellau RD (1958–74)	Merionethshire and Montgomeryshire (1894–95), Merionethshire (1895–1974)	1894	1974	Meirionnydd
Hendon RD	Middlesex	1894	1934	absorbed by Harrow UD and Wembley UD
South Mimms RD	Middlesex	1894	1934	Potters Bar UD
Staines RD	Middlesex	1894	1930	absorbed by Feltham UD, Hayes UD, Heston and Isleworth UD, Staines UD, Sunbury-on-Thames UD and Yiewsley and West Drayton UD
Uxbridge RD	Middlesex	1894	1929	absorbed by Ealing MB, Ruislip-Northwood UD, Uxbridge UD and Yiewsley UD
Abergavenny RD	Monmouthshire	1894	1974	Monmouth
Chepstow RD	Monmouthshire	1894	1974	Monmouth
Magor RD	Monmouthshire	1894	1935	Magor and St Mellons RD, absorbed by Caerleon UD, Newport CB and Pontypool RD
Monmouth RD	Monmouthshire	1894	1974	Monmouth
Pontypool RD	Monmouthshire	1894	1974	Torfaen, Monmouth
St Mellons RD	Monmouthshire and Glamorganshire (1894–95), Monmouthshire (1895–1935)	1894	1935	Magor and St Mellons RD, absorbed by Newport CB
Forden RD	Montgomeryshire	1894	1974	Montgomery
Llanfyllin RD	Montgomeryshire	1894	1974	Montgomery
Newtown and Llanidloes RD	Montgomeryshire	1894	1974	Montgomery
Machynlleth RD	Montgomeryshire, Merionethshire and Cardiganshire (1894–1934), Montgomeryshire and Merionethshire (1934–55), Montgomeryshire (1955–74)	1894	1974	Montgomery
Aylsham RD	Norfolk	1894	1935	St Faith's and Aylsham RD, absorbed by Erpingham RD, Smallburgh RD and Walsingham RD
Blofield RD	Norfolk	1894	1935	Blofield and Flegg RD (small part transferred to Loddon RD)
Central Wingland RD	Norfolk	1894	1897	absorbed by East Elloe RD, Parts of Holland and Marshland RD
Depwade RD	Norfolk	1894	1974	South Norfolk
Docking RD	Norfolk	1894	1974	West Norfolk
Downham RD	Norfolk	1894	1974	West Norfolk
East and West Flegg RD	Norfolk	1894	1935	Blofield and Flegg RD
Erpingham RD	Norfolk	1894	1974	North Norfolk
Forehoe RD	Norfolk	1894	1935	Forehoe and Henstead RD and Wymondham UD
Freebridge Lynn RD	Norfolk	1894	1974	West Norfolk
Guiltcross RD	Norfolk	1894	1902	absorbed by Depwade RD, Thetford RD and Wayland RD
Henstead RD	Norfolk	1894	1935	Forehoe and Henstead RD (small part transferred to Blofield and Flegg RD)
King's Lynn RD	Norfolk	1894	1935	absorbed by King's Lynn MB and Marshland RD
Loddon and Clavering RD (1894–1935), Loddon RD (1935–74)	Norfolk	1894	1974	South Norfolk
Marshland RD	Norfolk	1894	1974	West Norfolk
Mitford and Launditch RD	Norfolk	1894	1974	Breckland
Redmere RD	Norfolk	1894	1895	absorbed by Ely RD, Isle of Ely
Smallburgh RD	Norfolk	1894	1974	North Norfolk
St Faith's RD	Norfolk	1894	1935	St Faith's and Aylsham RD
Swaffham RD	Norfolk	1894	1974	Breckland
Thetford RD	Norfolk	1894	1935	absorbed by Downham RD, Swaffham RD and Wayland RD
Walsingham RD	Norfolk	1894	1974	North Norfolk
Wayland RD	Norfolk	1894	1974	Breckland
Aysgarth RD	North Riding of Yorkshire	1894	1974	Richmondshire
Bedale RD	North Riding of Yorkshire	1894	1974	Hambleton
Croft RD	North Riding of Yorkshire	1894	1974	Richmondshire, Hambleton
Easingwold RD	North Riding of Yorkshire	1894	1974	Hambleton
Flaxton RD	North Riding of Yorkshire	1894	1974	Ryedale
Guisborough RD	North Riding of Yorkshire	1894	1932	Saltburn and Marske-by-the-Sea UD, absorbed by Guisborough UD, Loftus UD, Redcar MB and Whitby RD
Helmsley RD	North Riding of Yorkshire	1894	1974	Ryedale
Kirby Moorside RD	North Riding of Yorkshire	1894	1974	Ryedale
Leyburn RD	North Riding of Yorkshire	1894	1974	Richmondshire
Lower Dunsforth RD	North Riding of Yorkshire	1894	1895	absorbed by Great Ouseburn RD, West Riding of Yorkshire
Malton RD	North Riding of Yorkshire	1894	1974	Ryedale
Middlesbrough RD	North Riding of Yorkshire	1894	1932	absorbed by Middlesbrough CB and Stokesley RD
Northallerton RD	North Riding of Yorkshire	1894	1974	Hambleton
Pickering RD	North Riding of Yorkshire	1894	1974	Ryedale
Reeth RD	North Riding of Yorkshire	1894	1974	Richmondshire
Richmond RD	North Riding of Yorkshire	1894	1974	Richmondshire
Scarborough RD	North Riding of Yorkshire	1894	1974	Scarborough
Startforth RD	North Riding of Yorkshire	1894	1974	Teesdale
Stokesley RD	North Riding of Yorkshire	1894	1974	Stockton-on-Tees, Middlesbrough, Hambleton
Thirsk RD	North Riding of Yorkshire	1894	1974	Harrogate, Hambleton
Wath RD	North Riding of Yorkshire	1894	1974	Harrogate
Whitby RD	North Riding of Yorkshire	1894	1974	Scarborough
Brackley RD	Northamptonshire	1894	1974	South Northamptonshire
Brixworth RD	Northamptonshire	1894	1974	Northampton, Daventry
Crick RD	Northamptonshire	1894	1935	absorbed by Daventry RD
Daventry RD	Northamptonshire	1894	1974	Daventry
Easton on the Hill RD	Northamptonshire	1894	1935	Oundle and Thrapston RD
Gretton RD	Northamptonshire	1894	1935	Oundle and Thrapston RD, absorbed by Kettering RD
Hardingstone RD	Northamptonshire	1894	1935	absorbed by Northampton RD and Northampton CB
Kettering RD	Northamptonshire	1894	1974	Corby, Kettering
Middleton Cheney RD	Northamptonshire	1894	1935	absorbed by Brackley RD
Northampton RD	Northamptonshire	1894	1974	South Northamptonshire, Northampton
Oxendon RD	Northamptonshire	1894	1935	absorbed by Kettering RD
Potterspury RD	Northamptonshire	1894	1935	absorbed by Northampton RD and Towcester RD
Towcester RD	Northamptonshire	1894	1974	South Northamptonshire
Wellingborough RD	Northamptonshire	1894	1974	Northampton, East Northamptonshire, Wellingborough
Oundle RD	Northamptonshire and Huntingdonshire (1894–1935)	1894	1935	Oundle and Thrapston RD, absorbed by Huntingdon RD and Norman Cross RD
Thrapston RD	Northamptonshire and Huntingdonshire (1894–1935)	1894	1935	Oundle and Thrapston RD, absorbed by Huntingdon RD and St Neots RD, Huntingdonshire and Raunds UD, Northamptonshire
Alnwick RD	Northumberland	1894	1974	Alnwick
Belford RD	Northumberland	1894	1974	Berwick-upon-Tweed
Bellingham RD	Northumberland	1894	1974	Tynedale
Castle Ward RD	Northumberland	1894	1974	Castle Morpeth, Newcastle upon Tyne
Glendale RD	Northumberland	1894	1974	Berwick-upon-Tweed
Haltwhistle RD	Northumberland	1894	1974	Tynedale
Hexham RD	Northumberland	1894	1974	Tynedale
Morpeth RD	Northumberland	1894	1974	Castle Morpeth
Norham and Islandshires RD	Northumberland	1894	1974	Berwick-upon-Tweed
Rothbury RD	Northumberland	1894	1974	Alnwick
Tynemouth RD	Northumberland	1894	1912	Longbenton UD and Seaton Delaval UD, absorbed by Blyth MB, Cramlington UD, Wallsend MB and Whitley and Monkseaton UD
Auckley RD	Nottinghamshire	1894	1895	absorbed by Doncaster RD, West Riding of Yorkshire
Bingham RD	Nottinghamshire	1894	1974	Rushcliffe
Blyth and Cuckney RD (1894–1925), Worksop RD (1925–74)	Nottinghamshire	1894	1974	Doncaster, Bassetlaw
East Retford RD	Nottinghamshire	1894	1974	Doncaster, Bassetlaw
Leake RD	Nottinghamshire	1894	1935	absorbed by Basford RD
Misterton RD	Nottinghamshire	1894	1935	absorbed by East Retford RD
Newark RD	Nottinghamshire	1894	1974	Newark
Skegby RD	Nottinghamshire	1894	1935	absorbed by Southwell RD, Sutton in Ashfield UD and Worksop UD
Southwell RD	Nottinghamshire	1894	1974	Newark
Stapleford RD	Nottinghamshire	1894	1935	Beeston and Stapleford UD
Basford RD	Nottinghamshire and Derbyshire (1894–1934), Nottinghamshire (1934–74)	1894	1974	Rushcliffe, Broxtowe, Ashfield, Gedling
Banbury RD	Oxfordshire	1894	1974	Cherwell
Bicester RD	Oxfordshire	1894	1932	Ploughley RD, absorbed by Bicester UD
Chipping Norton RD	Oxfordshire	1894	1974	West Oxfordshire
Crowmarsh RD	Oxfordshire	1894	1932	Bullingdon RD, absorbed by Henley RD
Culham RD	Oxfordshire	1894	1932	Bullingdon RD
Goring RD	Oxfordshire	1894	1932	absorbed by Henley RD
Headington RD	Oxfordshire	1894	1932	Bullingdon RD and Ploughley RD
Henley RD	Oxfordshire	1894	1974	South Oxfordshire
Thame RD	Oxfordshire	1894	1932	Bullingdon RD
Witney RD	Oxfordshire	1894	1974	West Oxfordshire
Woodstock RD	Oxfordshire	1894	1932	Ploughley RD, absorbed by Banbury RD and Chipping Norton RD
Haverfordwest RD	Pembrokeshire	1894	1974	Preseli
Llanfyrnach RD	Pembrokeshire	1894	1934	Cemaes RD
Narberth RD	Pembrokeshire	1894	1974	South Pembrokeshire
Pembroke RD	Pembrokeshire	1894	1974	South Pembrokeshire
St Dogmells RD	Pembrokeshire	1894	1934	Cemaes RD
Colwyn RD	Radnorshire	1894	1974	Radnor
Knighton RD	Radnorshire	1894	1974	Radnor
New Radnor RD	Radnorshire	1894	1974	Radnor
Painscastle RD	Radnorshire	1894	1974	Radnor
Rhayader RD	Radnorshire and Brecknockshire (1894–1934), Radnorshire (1934–74)	1894	1974	Radnor
Ketton RD	Rutland	1894	1974	Rutland
Oakham RD	Rutland	1894	1974	Rutland
Uppingham RD	Rutland	1894	1974	Rutland
Atcham RD	Shropshire	1894	1974	Shrewsbury
Bridgnorth RD	Shropshire	1894	1974	Bridgnorth
Burford RD	Shropshire	1894	1934	absorbed by Ludlow RD
Chirbury RD	Shropshire	1894	1934	absorbed by Clun RD
Church Stretton RD	Shropshire	1894	1934	absorbed by Atcham RD, Bridgnorth RD, Church Stretton UD and Ludlow RD
Cleobury Mortimer RD	Shropshire	1894	1934	absorbed by Bridgnorth RD and Ludlow RD
Clun RD	Shropshire	1894	1967	Clun and Bishop's Castle RD, absorbed by Atcham RD and Ludlow RD
Drayton RD	Shropshire	1894	1966	Market Drayton RD
Ellesmere RD	Shropshire	1894	1967	North Shropshire RD, absorbed by Atcham RD and Oswestry RD
Ludlow RD	Shropshire	1894	1974	South Shropshire
Madeley RD	Shropshire	1894	1895	absorbed by Atcham RD and Shifnal RD
Newport RD	Shropshire	1894	1936	absorbed by Wellington RD
Oswestry RD	Shropshire	1894	1974	Oswestry
Teme RD	Shropshire	1894	1934	absorbed by Clun RD
Wellington RD	Shropshire	1894	1974	The Wrekin
Wem RD	Shropshire	1894	1967	North Shropshire RD
Whitchurch RD	Shropshire	1894	1934	absorbed by Drayton RD, Wem RD and Whitchurch UD
Shifnal RD	Shropshire and Staffordshire (1894–1934), Shropshire (1934–74)	1894	1974	The Wrekin, Bridgnorth
Peterborough RD	Soke of Peterborough (1894–1965), Huntingdon and Peterborough (1965–74)	1894	1974	Peterborough
Barnack RD	Soke of Peterborough and Huntingdonshire (1894–1935), Soke of Peterborough (1935–65), Huntingdon and Peterborough (1965–74)	1894	1974	Peterborough
Axbridge RD	Somerset	1894	1974	Woodspring, Sedgemoor, Mendip
Bath RD	Somerset	1894	1933	Bathavon RD
Bridgwater RD	Somerset	1894	1974	Sedgemoor
Clutton RD	Somerset	1894	1974	Wansdyke, Mendip
Dulverton RD	Somerset	1894	1974	West Somerset
Frome RD	Somerset	1894	1974	Mendip
Keynsham RD	Somerset	1894	1933	Bathavon RD, absorbed by Bristol CB
Langport RD	Somerset	1894	1974	Yeovil
Long Ashton RD	Somerset	1894	1974	Woodspring
Poyntington RD	Somerset	1894	1895	absorbed by Sherborne RD, Dorset
Shepton Mallet RD	Somerset	1894	1974	Mendip
Wellington RD	Somerset	1894	1974	Taunton Deane
Wells RD	Somerset	1894	1974	Mendip
Williton RD	Somerset	1894	1974	West Somerset
Wincanton RD	Somerset	1894	1974	Yeovil
Yeovil RD	Somerset	1894	1974	Yeovil
Taunton RD	Somerset and Devon (1894–96), Somerset (1896–1974)	1894	1974	Taunton Deane
Chard RD	Somerset and Dorset (1894–95), Somerset (1895–1974)	1894	1974	Yeovil
Blore Heath RD	Staffordshire	1894	1932	absorbed by Newcastle-under-Lyme RD
Cannock RD	Staffordshire	1894	1974	South Staffordshire
Cheadle RD	Staffordshire	1894	1974	Staffordshire Moorlands
Dudley RD	Staffordshire	1894	1929	absorbed by Dudley CB, Worcestershire
Gnosall RD	Staffordshire	1894	1934	absorbed by Cannock RD and Stafford RD
Kingswinford RD	Staffordshire	1894	1934	absorbed by Brierley Hill UD
Leek RD	Staffordshire	1894	1974	Staffordshire Moorlands
Lichfield RD	Staffordshire	1894	1974	Cannock Chase, Lichfield
Mayfield RD	Staffordshire	1894	1934	absorbed by Cheadle RD, Leek RD and Uttoxeter RD
Newcastle-under-Lyme RD	Staffordshire	1894	1974	Newcastle-under-Lyme
Stafford RD	Staffordshire	1894	1974	Stafford
Stoke upon Trent RD	Staffordshire	1894	1922	absorbed by Cheadle RD and Stoke on Trent CB
Stone RD	Staffordshire	1894	1974	Stafford
Tutbury RD	Staffordshire	1894	1974	East Staffordshire
Uttoxeter RD	Staffordshire	1894	1974	East Staffordshire
Walsall RD	Staffordshire	1894	1934	Aldridge UD, absorbed by Darlaston UD and Willenhall UD
Wolstanton RD	Staffordshire	1894	1904	Wolstanton United UD, absorbed by Kidsgrove UD, Smallthorne UD and Tunstall UD
Seisdon RD	Staffordshire and Shropshire (1894–95), Staffordshire (1895–1974)	1894	1974	South Staffordshire
Chertsey RD	Surrey	1894	1933	Bagshot RD and Walton and Weybridge UD, absorbed by Egham UD, Guildford RD and Woking UD
Croydon RD	Surrey	1894	1915	Beddington and Wallington UD, Coulsdon and Purley UD and Mitcham UD, absorbed by Epsom RD and Godstone RD
Dorking RD	Surrey	1894	1933	Dorking and Horley RD, absorbed by Dorking UD, Guildford RD, Hambledon RD and Leatherhead UD
Egham RD	Surrey	1894	1906	Egham UD
Epsom RD	Surrey	1894	1933	Banstead UD and Dorking and Horley RD, absorbed by Carshalton UD, Epsom and Ewell UD, Esher UD, Leatherhead UD, Malden and Coombe UD, Surbiton UD and Sutton and Cheam UD
Farnham RD	Surrey	1894	1933	absorbed by Farnham UD, Guildford RD, Hambledon RD and Haslemere UD
Godstone RD	Surrey	1894	1974	Tandridge
Guildford RD	Surrey	1894	1974	Guildford
Hambledon RD	Surrey	1894	1974	Waverley
Kingston upon Thames RD	Surrey	1894	1895	Esher and the Dittons UD, absorbed by East Molesey UD, Ham UD, New Malden UD and Surbiton UD
Reigate RD	Surrey	1894	1933	Banstead UD and Dorking and Horley RD, absorbed by Caterham and Warlingham UD, Coulsdon and Purley UD, Epsom and Ewell UD, Godstone RD and Reigate MB
Alcester RD	Warwickshire	1894	1974	Stratford-on-Avon
Atherstone RD	Warwickshire	1894	1974	North Warwickshire
Brailes RD	Warwickshire	1894	1931	absorbed by Shipston on Stour RD
Castle Bromwich RD	Warwickshire	1894	1912	absorbed by Meriden RD
Coventry RD	Warwickshire	1894	1928	absorbed by Coventry CB
Farnborough RD	Warwickshire	1894	1932	absorbed by Southam RD
Foleshill RD	Warwickshire	1894	1932	absorbed by Bedworth UD, Coventry CB, Meriden RD, Rugby RD and Warwick RD
Meriden RD	Warwickshire	1894	1974	Solihull, North Warwickshire, Coventry
Monks Kirby RD	Warwickshire	1894	1932	absorbed by Rugby RD
Nuneaton RD	Warwickshire	1894	1932	absorbed by Atherstone RD, Bedworth UD, Meriden RD and Rugby RD
Rugby RD	Warwickshire	1894	1974	Rugby
Solihull RD	Warwickshire	1894	1932	Solihull UD, absorbed by Meriden RD, Stratford on Avon RD and Warwick RD
Stratford on Avon RD	Warwickshire	1894	1974	Solihull, Stratford-on-Avon
Warwick RD	Warwickshire	1894	1974	Warwick
Southam RD	Warwickshire and Northamptonshire (1894–95), Warwickshire (1895–1974)	1894	1974	Stratford-on-Avon
Tamworth RD	Warwickshire and Staffordshire (1894–1934), Warwickshire (1934–74)	1894	1965	absorbed by Atherstone RD, Meriden RD and Tamworth MB, Staffordshire
Shipston on Stour RD	Warwickshire, Gloucestershire and Worcestershire (1894–1931), Warwickshire and Worcestershire (1931–74)	1894	1974	Stratford-on-Avon
Barnsley RD	West Riding of Yorkshire	1894	1938	absorbed by Barnsley CB, Darton UD, Hemsworth RD, Penistone RD and Royston UD
Bishopthorpe RD	West Riding of Yorkshire	1894	1937	absorbed by Tadcaster RD
Bowland RD	West Riding of Yorkshire	1894	1974	Ribble Valley
Doncaster RD	West Riding of Yorkshire	1894	1974	Doncaster
Goole RD	West Riding of Yorkshire	1894	1974	Boothferry
Great Ouseburn RD	West Riding of Yorkshire	1894	1938	Nidderdale RD
Halifax RD	West Riding of Yorkshire	1894	1937	absorbed by Brighouse MB, Elland UD, Huddersfield CB, Sowerby Bridge UD and Spenborough UD
Hemsworth RD	West Riding of Yorkshire	1894	1974	Selby, Barnsley, Wakefield
Hunslet RD	West Riding of Yorkshire	1894	1937	absorbed by Rothwell UD, West Riding of Yorkshire.
Keighley RD	West Riding of Yorkshire	1894	1938	absorbed by Keighley MB
Kiveton Park RD	West Riding of Yorkshire	1894	1974	Rotherham
Knaresborough RD	West Riding of Yorkshire	1894	1938	Nidderdale RD, absorbed by Harrogate MB and Knaresborough UD
Leeds RD, Leeds Roundhay and Seacroft RD	West Riding of Yorkshire	1894	1912	absorbed by Leeds CB
Pateley Bridge RD	West Riding of Yorkshire	1894	1937	Ripon and Pateley Bridge RD
Penistone RD	West Riding of Yorkshire	1894	1974	Barnsley
Pontefract RD	West Riding of Yorkshire	1894	1938	Osgoldcross RD, absorbed by Knottingley UD and Pontefract MB
Ripon RD	West Riding of Yorkshire	1894	1938	Ripon and Pateley Bridge RD
Rotherham RD	West Riding of Yorkshire	1894	1974	Rotherham
Saddleworth RD	West Riding of Yorkshire	1894	1900	Saddleworth UD
Sedbergh RD	West Riding of Yorkshire	1894	1974	South Lakeland
Selby RD	West Riding of Yorkshire	1894	1974	Selby
Settle RD	West Riding of Yorkshire	1894	1974	Craven
Skipton RD	West Riding of Yorkshire	1894	1974	Bradford, Craven, Pendle
Tadcaster RD	West Riding of Yorkshire	1894	1974	Leeds, Selby
Thorne RD	West Riding of Yorkshire	1894	1974	Doncaster
Todmorden RD	West Riding of Yorkshire	1894	1939	Hepton RD
Wakefield RD	West Riding of Yorkshire	1894	1974	Wakefield
Wetherby RD	West Riding of Yorkshire	1894	1974	Harrogate, Leeds
Wharfedale RD	West Riding of Yorkshire	1894	1974	Leeds, Harrogate
Wortley RD	West Riding of Yorkshire	1894	1974	Barnsley, Sheffield
Brandon RD	West Suffolk	1894	1935	absorbed by Mildenhall RD and Thingoe RD
Clare RD	West Suffolk	1894	1974	St Edmundsbury
Cosford RD	West Suffolk	1894	1974	Babergh
Melford RD	West Suffolk	1894	1974	Babergh
Mildenhall RD	West Suffolk	1894	1974	Forest Heath
Moulton RD	West Suffolk	1894	1935	absorbed by Clare RD and Mildenhall RD
Thedwastre RD	West Suffolk	1894	1974	Mid Suffolk
Thingoe RD	West Suffolk	1894	1974	St Edmundsbury
East Preston RD	West Sussex	1894	1933	Chichester RD and Worthing RD, absorbed by Littlehampton UD
Horsham RD	West Sussex	1894	1974	Horsham
Midhurst RD	West Sussex	1894	1974	Chichester
Petworth RD	West Sussex	1894	1974	Chichester
Steyning West RD	West Sussex	1894	1933	Chanctonbury RD and Worthing RD, absorbed by Shoreham-by-Sea UD and Worthing MB
Thakenham RD	West Sussex	1894	1933	Chanctonbury RD and Worthing RD, absorbed by Horsham RD and Worthing MB
Westbourne RD	West Sussex	1894	1933	Chichester RD
Westhampnett RD	West Sussex	1894	1933	Chichester RD, absorbed by Bognor Regis UD and Chichester MB
East Westmorland RD	Westmorland	1894	1935	North Westmorland RD, absorbed by South Westmorland RD
South Westmorland RD	Westmorland	1894	1974	South Lakeland
West Ward RD	Westmorland	1894	1935	Lakes UD and North Westmorland RD, absorbed by South Westmorland RD
Amesbury RD	Wiltshire	1894	1974	Salisbury
Bradford-on-Avon RD	Wiltshire	1894	1934	Bradford and Melksham RD, absorbed by Bradford-on-Avon UD, Melksham UD and Trowbridge UD
Bramshaw RD	Wiltshire	1894	1895	absorbed by New Forest RD, Hampshire
Calne RD	Wiltshire	1894	1934	Calne and Chippenham RD, absorbed by Calne MB
Chippenham RD	Wiltshire	1894	1934	Calne and Chippenham RD
Cricklade and Wootton Bassett RD	Wiltshire	1894	1974	North Wiltshire
Devizes RD	Wiltshire	1894	1974	Kennet
Highworth RD	Wiltshire	1894	1974	Thamesdown
Malmesbury RD	Wiltshire	1894	1974	North Wiltshire
Marlborough RD	Wiltshire	1894	1934	Marlborough and Ramsbury RD, absorbed by Marlborough MB
Melksham RD	Wiltshire	1894	1934	Bradford and Melksham RD, absorbed by Devizes RD and Melksham UD
Pewsey RD	Wiltshire	1894	1974	Kennet
Ramsbury RD	Wiltshire	1894	1934	Marlborough and Ramsbury RD
Salisbury RD	Wiltshire	1894	1934	Salisbury and Wilton RD
Tisbury RD	Wiltshire	1894	1934	Mere and Tisbury RD
Warminster RD	Wiltshire	1894	1934	Warminster and Westbury RD
Westbury and Whorwellsdown RD	Wiltshire	1894	1934	Warminster and Westbury RD
Wilton RD	Wiltshire	1894	1934	Salisbury and Wilton RD and Warminster and Westbury RD, absorbed by Wilton MB
Mere RD	Wiltshire and Somerset (1894–96), Wiltshire (1896–1934)	1894	1934	Mere and Tisbury RD and Warminster and Westbury RD
Bromsgrove RD	Worcestershire	1894	1974	Bromsgrove
Droitwich RD	Worcestershire	1894	1974	Wychavon, Worcester
Evesham RD	Worcestershire	1894	1974	Wychavon
Feckenham RD	Worcestershire	1894	1933	absorbed by Evesham RD and Redditch UD
Halesowen RD	Worcestershire	1894	1925	Halesowen UD
King's Norton RD	Worcestershire	1894	1898	King's Norton and Northfield UD
Martley RD	Worcestershire	1894	1974	Malvern Hills
Mathon RD	Worcestershire	1894	1897	absorbed by Ledbury RD, Herefordshire
Pershore RD	Worcestershire	1894	1974	Worcester, Wychavon
Rock RD	Worcestershire	1894	1933	absorbed by Kidderminster RD and Tenbury RD
Stourbridge RD	Worcestershire	1894	1897	Lye and Wollescote UD
Tenbury RD	Worcestershire	1894	1974	Leominster
Upton upon Severn RD	Worcestershire	1894	1974	Malvern Hills
Warley RD	Worcestershire	1894	1908	absorbed by Oldbury UD
Yardley RD	Worcestershire	1894	1912	absorbed by Birmingham CB
Kidderminster RD	Worcestershire, Shropshire and Staffordshire (1894–95), Worcestershire (1895–1974)	1894	1974	Wyre Forest

== 1895–1929 ==
In the period 1895–1929 only two rural districts were formed, while forty-six were abolished, a net decrease of 44, bringing the total number of rural districts to 646.

Rural district	County	Created	Abolished	Successor(s)
New Winchester RD (1898–1905), Winchester RD (1905–74)	Hampshire	1898	1974	Eastleigh, Winchester
Newcastle upon Tyne RD	Northumberland	1911	1974	Newcastle upon Tyne

== 1930–39 ==
In the 1930s sixty-two rural districts were formed and two hundred thirty-one abolished, a net decrease of 169, bringing the total number of rural districts to 477. This was largely due to the County review orders instigated by the Local Government Act 1929.

Rural district	County	Created	Abolished	Successor(s)
Leominster and Wigmore RD	Herefordshire	1930	1974	Leominster
Ross and Whitchurch RD	Herefordshire	1931	1974	South Herefordshire
East Kesteven RD	Lincolnshire, Parts of Kesteven	1931	1974	North Kesteven
North Kesteven RD	Lincolnshire, Parts of Kesteven	1931	1974	North Kesteven
South Kesteven RD	Lincolnshire, Parts of Kesteven	1931	1974	South Kesteven
West Kesteven RD	Lincolnshire, Parts of Kesteven	1931	1974	South Kesteven
Kingsclere and Whitchurch RD	Hampshire	1932	1974	Basingstoke
Ringwood and Fordingbridge RD	Hampshire	1932	1974	New Forest, Wimborne, Christchurch
Romsey and Stockbridge RD	Hampshire	1932	1974	Test Valley
Bullingdon RD	Oxfordshire	1932	1974	South Oxfordshire
Ploughley RD	Oxfordshire	1932	1974	Cherwell
Bathavon RD	Somerset	1933	1974	Wansdyke
Bagshot RD	Surrey	1933	1974	Surrey Heath
Dorking and Horley RD	Surrey	1933	1974	Crawley, Mole Valley, Reigate and Banstead
Chanctonbury RD	West Sussex	1933	1974	Horsham
Chichester RD	West Sussex	1933	1974	Arun, Chichester
Worthing RD	West Sussex	1933	1974	Adur, Arun
Nant Conway RD	Caernarfonshire	1934	1974	Aberconwy
South Cambridgeshire RD	Cambridgeshire (1934–65), Cambridgeshire and Isle of Ely (1965–74)	1934	1974	South Cambridgeshire
Teifiside RD	Cardiganshire	1934	1974	Ceredigion
Kerrier RD	Cornwall	1934	1974	Kerrier
Wadebridge RD	Cornwall	1934	1968	Wadebridge and Padstow RD
Border RD	Cumberland	1934	1974	Carlisle
Ennerdale RD	Cumberland	1934	1974	Copeland
Millom RD	Cumberland	1934	1974	Copeland
Blyth RD	East Suffolk	1934	1974	Suffolk Coastal
Deben RD	East Suffolk	1934	1974	Suffolk Coastal
Gipping RD	East Suffolk	1934	1974	Mid Suffolk
Lothingland RD	East Suffolk	1934	1974	Great Yarmouth, Waveney
Wainford RD	East Suffolk	1934	1974	Waveney
Dore and Bredwardine RD	Herefordshire	1934	1974	South Herefordshire
Bridge-Blean RD	Kent	1934	1974	Canterbury
Cemaes RD	Pembrokeshire	1934	1974	Preseli
Bradford and Melksham RD	Wiltshire	1934	1974	West Wiltshire
Calne and Chippenham RD	Wiltshire	1934	1974	North Wiltshire
Marlborough and Ramsbury RD	Wiltshire	1934	1974	Kennet
Mere and Tisbury RD	Wiltshire	1934	1974	Salisbury
Salisbury and Wilton RD	Wiltshire	1934	1974	Salisbury
Warminster and Westbury RD	Wiltshire	1934	1974	West Wiltshire
Masham RD	North Riding of Yorkshire	1934	1974	Harrogate
Llandilo RD (1935–53), Llandeilo RD (1953–74)	Carmarthenshire	1935	1974	Dinefwr
Aled RD	Denbighshire	1935	1974	Colwyn, Aberconwy
Ceiriog RD	Denbighshire	1935	1974	Glyndŵr
Hiraethog RD	Denbighshire	1935	1974	Aberconwy, Colwyn
Derwent RD	East Riding of Yorkshire	1935	1974	Selby
Holderness RD	East Riding of Yorkshire	1935	1974	Holderness
East Dean RD	Gloucestershire	1935	1974	Forest of Dean
North Cotswold RD	Gloucestershire	1935	1974	Cotswold
Sodbury RD	Gloucestershire	1935	1974	Northavon, Stroud
Braughing RD	Hertfordshire	1935	1974	East Hertfordshire
Swale RD	Kent	1935	1974	Swale
Melton and Belvoir RD	Leicestershire	1935	1974	Melton
Magor and St Mellons RD	Monmouthshire	1935	1974	Cardiff, Newport, Torfaen
Blofield and Flegg RD	Norfolk	1935	1974	Great Yarmouth, Broadland
Forehoe and Henstead RD	Norfolk	1935	1974	South Norfolk
St Faith's and Aylsham RD	Norfolk	1935	1974	Broadland
Oundle and Thrapston RD	Northamptonshire	1935	1974	East Northamptonshire
North Westmorland RD	Westmorland	1935	1974	Eden
Ripon and Pateley Bridge RD	West Riding of Yorkshire	1937	1974	Harrogate
Nidderdale RD	West Riding of Yorkshire	1938	1974	Harrogate
Osgoldcross RD	West Riding of Yorkshire	1938	1974	Selby, Wakefield
Hepton RD	West Riding of Yorkshire	1939	1974	Calderdale

== 1940–74 ==
From 1940 until their abolition in 1974, there were only six more rural districts formed and a further thirteen abolished, a net decrease of 7, bringing the total number of rural districts to 470.

Rural district	County	Created	Abolished	Successor(s)
Epping and Ongar RD	Essex	1955	1974	Brentwood, Epping Forest
South East Derbyshire RD	Derbyshire	1959	1974	Erewash, South Derbyshire
Market Drayton RD	Shropshire	1966	1974	North Shropshire
Clun and Bishop's Castle RD	Shropshire	1967	1974	South Shropshire
North Shropshire RD	Shropshire	1967	1974	North Shropshire
Wadebridge and Padstow RD	Cornwall	1968	1974	North Cornwall
