= Norton Rural District =

There were two different Norton Rural Districts in different parts of England:

- Norton Rural District (Derbyshire), a rural district formed in England 1894–1974
- Norton Rural District (Yorkshire)
