= Hereford and Worcester =

Former English county

- History
  - Created: 1974
  - Abolished: 1998
  - Succeeded by: Herefordshire (unitary); Worcestershire (shire county)
- Status: Non-metropolitan county
- ONS code: 25
- Government: Hereford and Worcester County Council
  - HQ: Worcester
- Coat of arms of Hereford and Worcester County Council
- Subdivisions
  - Type: Non-metropolitan districts

Hereford and Worcester (/ˈhɛrɪfərd ... ˈwʊstər/ HERR-if-ərd ... WUUST-ər) was an English non-metropolitan county created on 1 April 1974 by the Local Government Act 1972 from the areas of the former administrative county of Herefordshire, most of Worcestershire (except Halesowen, Stourbridge and Warley, which became part of the West Midlands) and the county borough of Worcester. An aim of the Act was to increase efficiency of local government: the two counties are among England's smaller and less populous counties, particularly after the same Act transferred some of Worcestershire's most urbanised areas to the West Midlands.

The county bordered Shropshire, Staffordshire and the West Midlands to the north, Warwickshire to the east, Gloucestershire to the south, and Gwent and Powys in Wales to the west. It was abolished in 1998 and reverted, with some transfers of territory, to the two separate historic counties of Herefordshire and Worcestershire.

== Creation ==
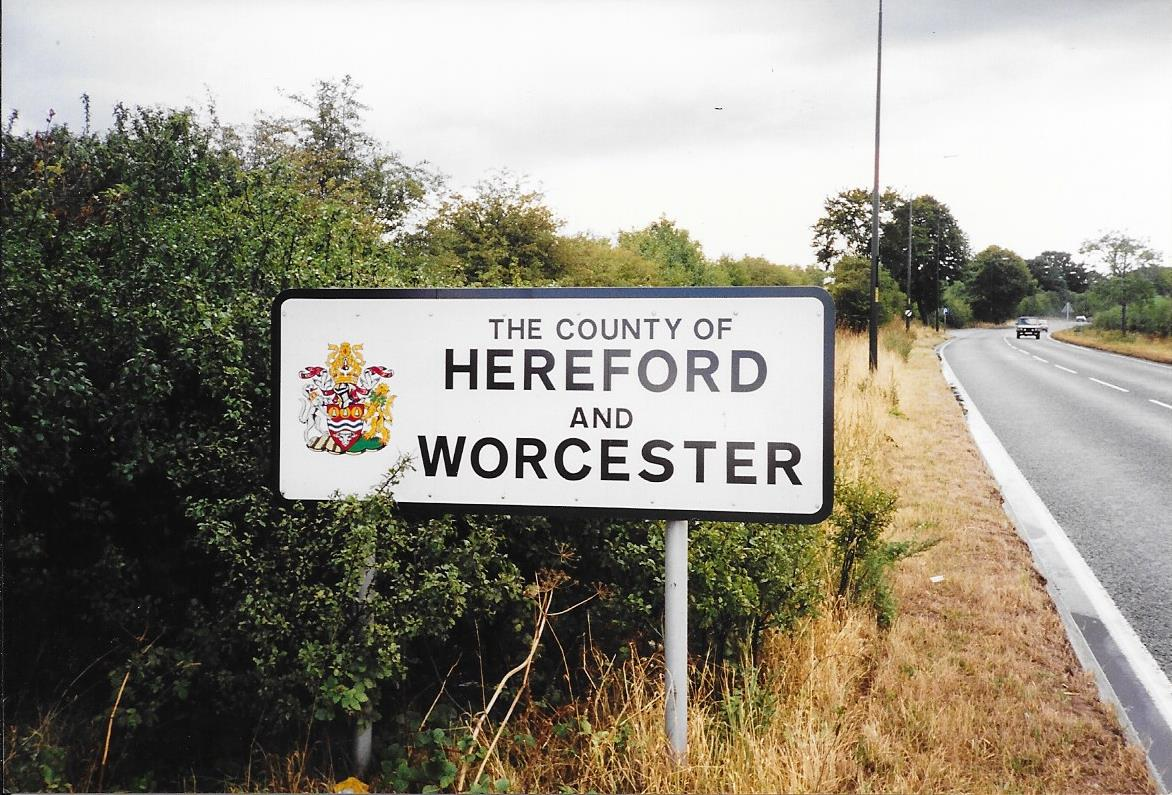
Hereford and Worcester road sign

The Local Government Boundary Commission in 1948 proposed a merger of the two counties, but the proposals of this Commission were not implemented. A merger of Herefordshire with South Worcestershire was again proposed by the Redcliffe-Maud Report in 1969, and was retained in the Conservative Party's February 1971 White Paper (gaining more of Worcestershire), although no name was given. In the Local Government Bill introduced into Parliament in November 1971, it was named "Malvernshire", after the Malvern Hills, which were roughly in the geographical centre of the new county and formed the former border. This name was ridiculed and was altered during the Bill's passage through Parliament. The name Wyvern was also suggested, combining the names of the rivers that run through the two cities and counties: the River Wye through Hereford, and the River Severn through Worcester; a wyvern is a dragon emblem often found in heraldry. A commercial radio station for the area, Wyvern FM was set up in 1982 using this allusion. It was also used much later by the FirstGroup who renamed their bus operations in the area First Wyvern as opposed to the more historical First Midland Red used previously.

Herefordshire had about 140,000 people, far fewer than Worcestershire, with about 420,000 and the change was thus perceived in Herefordshire as a takeover rather than a merger, especially after it emerged that the administrative centre was to be located to the east of Worcester city. It never attracted the loyalties of residents. A "Hands off Herefordshire" campaign was set up, and the proposal was opposed by Herefordshire County Council.

A Hereford bull was led down Whitehall on 6 April 1972, as part of a protest, which also involved a petition handed in at 10 Downing Street calling for the preservation of Herefordshire.

Despite the opposition of many of the population of Herefordshire, neither of the county's two Conservative MPs opposed the merger. Parliamentary opposition had to be led from outside the county by Terry Davis, MP for Bromsgrove, who noted that the petition had been signed by 60,000 people. Clive Bossom, the MP for Leominster in Herefordshire, supported the merger, noting that "much of South Worcestershire is very like Herefordshire".

It was originally proposed to have a single large Herefordshire district within Hereford and Worcester. But this was divided, with separate Hereford, South Herefordshire and Leominster districts, and part of Herefordshire in the Malvern Hills district.

Meanwhile, large sections of Worcestershire in the Black Country and Birmingham suburbs were moved to the West Midlands. This was intended to create a more unified metropolitan county, since prior to this the conurbation had been split between Staffordshire, Warwickshire, and Worcestershire. As a result, Hereford & Worcester was quite rural in character. These transfers continued a slow process of simplifying Worcestershire's boundaries, which once had included a complex set of exclaves within other counties.

== Districts ==
Hereford and Worcester was divided into nine districts:

Map	No	District	Composition
	1	Wyre Forest	Worcestershire: Bewdley, Kidderminster, Stourport, Kidderminster RD
	2	Bromsgrove	Worcestershire: Bromsgrove, Bromsgrove RD
	3	Redditch	Worcestershire: Redditch UD
	4	Wychavon	Worcestershire: Droitwich, Evesham, Evesham RD, most of Droitwich RD, most of Pershore RD
	5	Worcester	Worcestershire: County Borough of Worcester, Warndon from Droitwich RD, St Peter the Great County from Pershore RD
	6	Malvern Hills	Worcestershire: Malvern, Martley RD, Upton RD Herefordshire: Bromyard RD, Ledbury RD
	7	Leominster	Worcestershire: Tenbury RD Herefordshire: Kington, Leominster, Kington RD, Leominster and Wigmore RD, Weobley RD
	8	Hereford	Herefordshire: Hereford MB
	9	South Herefordshire	Herefordshire: Ross-on-Wye, Dore and Bredwardine RD, Hereford RD, Ross and Whitchurch RD

== Abolition ==
As part of the 1990s English local government reform, the Local Government Commission under John Banham recommended that Herefordshire should become a unitary authority, with the rest of the former county retaining a two-tier structure. This came into effect on 1 April 1998. A new unitary Herefordshire was formed from the Herefordshire parts of Malvern Hills and Leominster, along with Hereford and South Herefordshire, and became a unitary authority. The remainder of those two districts became a new Malvern Hills district, in the new two-tier non-metropolitan county of Worcestershire, along with the remaining districts.

Despite its abolition, the former county's name remains in use by organisations such as Hereford and Worcester Fire and Rescue Service, BBC Hereford and Worcester, and the Hereford and Worcester Chamber of Commerce.

If Hereford and Worcester still existed, the population of the county would be 797,935 people in 2022.

== See also ==
- Troms og Finnmark, former Norwegian county
- Vestfold og Telemark, former Norwegian county
