= North Westmorland =

North Westmorland can refer to:

- The Barony of Westmorland, which was the northern part of the English traditional county of Westmorland.
- The North Westmorland Rural District, which was an administrative district in Westmorland in the late 20th century.
