= Aled Rural District =

Rural district in Wales (1935–1974)

Coordinates: 53.207°N 3.330°W

Aled
- Area
  - 1935: 69,206 acres (280.07 km^{2})
  - 1961: 69,206 acres (280.07 km^{2})
- Population
  - 1931: 6,870
  - 1971: 6,559
- History
  - Created: 1935
  - Abolished: 1974
  - Succeeded by: Aberconwy, Colwyn
- Status: Rural District
  - HQ: Rhyl

Aled was a rural district in the administrative county of Denbighshire, Wales, from 1935 to 1974.

The district was created by a county review order in 1935 which reorganised districts in the county. It was formed by merging the bulk of St Asaph (Denbigh) Rural District with the Nant Conwy area previously administered by Conway Rural District in neighbouring Caernarfonshire. The district was named after the River Aled.

The district contained the following civil parishes:

- Abergele Rural CP (part to Abergele UD, gained part of abolished St. George CP)
- Betws Abergele CP (part to Abergele UD, gained part of abolished Llanddulas CP)
- Bylchau
- Cefn
- Llaneilian yn Rhos
- Llanefydd
- Llanfair Talhaearn
- Llansantffraid Glan Conwy
- Llansannan
- Trefnant

The former parishes of St George and Llanddulas were abolished, being split between an enlarged Abergele Urban District and other parishes in Aled RD.

The rural district was abolished by the Local Government Act 1972 in 1974. Its area passed to the Borough of Colwyn in the new county of Clwyd with the exception of Llansantffraid Glan Conwy which was included in the Borough of Aberconwy in Gwynedd.

== Sources ==
Denbighshire Administrative County (Vision of Britain)
