= List of counties of England by population in 1981 =

This is a list of counties of England, ordered by population as at the 1981 census.

Rank	County	Total population
1	Greater London	6,495,163
2	West Midlands	2,605,113
3	Greater Manchester	2,547,045
4	West Yorkshire	1,999,043
5	Merseyside	1,481,857
6	Essex	1,446,621
7	Kent	1,428,921
8	Hampshire	1,423,915
9	Lancashire	1,348,440
10	South Yorkshire	1,282,161
11	Tyne and Wear	1,120,100
12	Staffordshire	999,539
13	Surrey	974,479
14	Nottinghamshire	967,734
15	Hertfordshire	936,123
16	Devon	919,483
17	Cheshire	911,980
18	Derbyshire	895,149
19	Avon	891,560
20	Humberside	835,643
21	Leicestershire	827,407
22	Norfolk	676,688
23	Berkshire	662,689
24	North Yorkshire	643,475
25	West Sussex	641,071
26	East Sussex	633,613
27	Hereford and Worcester	617,671
28	Durham	594,788
29	Suffolk	583,594
30	Dorset	570,321
31	Cambridgeshire	563,773
32	Cleveland	558,820
33	Buckinghamshire	553,225
34	Lincolnshire	538,269
35	Northamptonshire	519,046
36	Wiltshire	504,984
37	Oxfordshire	500,554
38	Bedfordshire	497,639
39	Gloucestershire	487,806
40	Cumbria	467,355
41	Warwickshire	466,045
42	Somerset	413,048
43	Cornwall & Isles of Scilly	412,835
44	Salop (Shropshire)	365,355
45	Northumberland	291,175
46	Isle of Wight	113,008
TOTAL		45,214,323
