= Sudbury Rural District =

Former local government area in the UK

Coordinates: 52.93°N 1.80°W

Sudbury was a rural district of Derbyshire in England from 1894 to 1934.

It was created from the part of the Uttoxeter rural sanitary district that was in Derbyshire (with the larger part in Staffordshire forming the Uttoxeter Rural District). It consisted of the parishes of Boyleston, Cubley, Doveridge, Marston Montgomery, Norbury and Roston, Somersal Herbert and Sudbury.

It was abolished in 1934 under a County Review Order, and its area transferred to Ashbourne Rural District.
