= West Ward Rural District =

Historical rural district

Coordinates: 54.564°N 2.778°W

West Ward was a rural district of the administrative county of Westmorland. The area was directly based on the former West Ward rural sanitary district, and therefore indirectly on the old West Ward or hundred of Westmorland.

The district existed from 1894 to 1935. The civil parish of Shap became a separate urban district in 1905, and was entirely surrounded by the district. Other places in the district included Patterdale and Askham.

In 1935, under a County Review Order it merged with Shap UDC and East Westmorland RDC to become North Westmorland Rural District except for the parish of Patterdale which became part of Lakes Urban District.
