= Leath =

Historic ward of Cumberland, England

Coordinates: 54.6°N 2.7°W

Leath was one of the wards of the historic county of Cumberland in north west England. Unlike most other English counties, Cumberland was divided into wards rather than hundreds.

The ward was bounded on the south by Westmorland, the north by Cumberland and Eskdale wards, the east by the counties of Northumberland and Durham and on the west by the wards of Allerdale above Derwent and Allerdale below Derwent.

In the Imperial Gazetteer of England and Wales (1870–72) John Marius Wilson described Leath:

LEATH, a ward in Cumberland; bounded by Northumberland, Durham, and Westmoreland, and by the wards of Eskdale and Allerdale; and containing Addingham parish, twenty other parishes, and part of another. Acres, 216,296. Pop. in 1851, 29,103; in 1861, 28,675. Houses, 5,819.

The ward largely corresponds to that part of the former Eden District that lies within Cumberland that was before 1974 the Penrith urban and rural districts and the Alston with Garrigill Rural District.

Market towns in the ward were Penrith (the largest settlement and seat of local government), Kirkoswald and Alston. At one time, the village of Greystoke had held markets.

A large part of the ward once made up the main part of the Royal hunting ground known as Inglewood Forest, which was subject to Forest Laws up until the reign of Henry VIII.

The manors of Penrith, Langwathby, Castle Sowerby and Great Salkeld and at times Glassonby and Gamblesby were part of the royal estate known as the Honour of Penrith, which eventually passed into the hands of the Dukes of Devonshire.
