= Christchurch Rural District =

Former rural district in Dorset and Hampshire, England

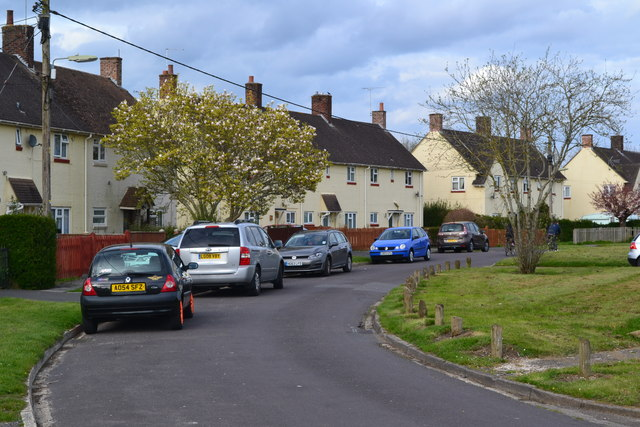
- History
  - Created: 1894
  - Abolished: 1932
- Status: Former rural district
- Today part of: Bournemouth, Christchurch and Poole

The Christchurch Rural District was a rural district in Hampshire, England. It was formed in 1894 and was dissolved in 1932 and succeeded by Ringwood and Fordingbridge Rural District.

== Settlements ==
- Fordingbridge
- Moordown
- Ringwood

== See also ==
- List of rural districts in England and Wales 1894–1930
