= New Radnor Rural District =

Rural district in Radnorshire, Wales

Coordinates: 52.196°N 3.144°W

New Radnor
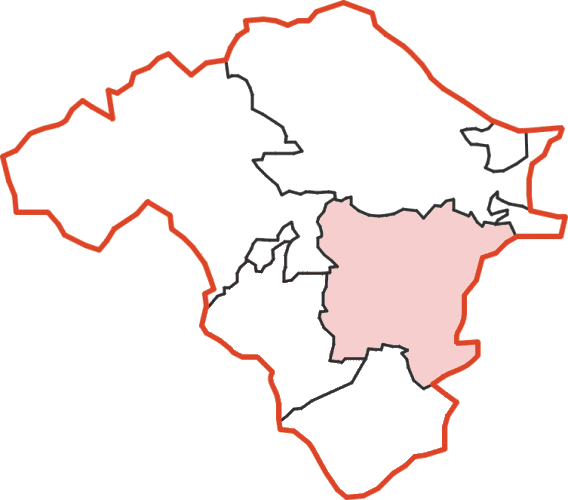
- Area
  - 1911: 51,893 acres (210.00 km^{2})
  - 1931: 51,893 acres (210.00 km^{2})
  - 1961: 51,893 acres (210.00 km^{2})
- Population
  - 1901: 2,944
  - 1931: 2,581
  - 1971: 1,753
- History
  - Origin: Sanitary district
  - Created: 1894
  - Abolished: 1974
  - Succeeded by: Radnorshire
- Status: Rural district
- Government: New Radnor Rural District Council
  - HQ: Kington and then Presteigne
- Subdivisions
  - Type: Civil parishes

New Radnor was, from 1894 to 1974, a rural district in the administrative county of Radnorshire, Wales.

The district was formed by the Local Government Act 1894, when the existing Kington Rural Sanitary District was divided into two: the section in Herefordshire was reconstituted as Kington Rural District, while the section in Radnorshire became New Radnor Rural District. The new district took its name from the village of New Radnor, at one time a borough and county town of Radnorshire. The council was based in Kington in Herefordshire until the last few years when it was transferred to Presteigne.

The rural district comprised fifteen civil parishes:

- Colva
- Ednol
- Evenjobb
- Gladestry
- Glascwm
- Harpton and Wolfpits
- Kinnerton, Salford and Badland
- Llandeglau
- Llanfihangel Nant Melan
- Michaelchurch on Arrow
- New Radnor
- Newchurch
- Old Radnor and Burlingjobb
- Trewern and Gwaithla
- Walton and Womaston

The district was abolished in 1974 under the Local Government Act 1972, which completely reorganised local administration in England and Wales. Its area became part of the District of Radnor in the new county of Powys.
