= Farnborough Rural District =

Former local government area in the UK

Coordinates: 52.14°N 1.4°W

Farnborough was a rural district in Warwickshire, England from 1894 to 1932.

It was formed from that part of the Banbury rural sanitary district which was in Warwickshire (the rest, including part of the parish of Mollington historically in Warwickshire, becoming the Banbury Rural District in Oxfordshire, or the Middleton Cheney Rural District in Northamptonshire).

It contained the parishes of Avon Dassett, Farnborough, Radway, Ratley and Upton, Shotteswell and Warmington.

It was abolished under a County Review Order in 1932, becoming part of the Southam Rural District.
