= Llanfyrnach Rural District =

Former local government area in the UK

Coordinates: 51.949°N 4.588°W

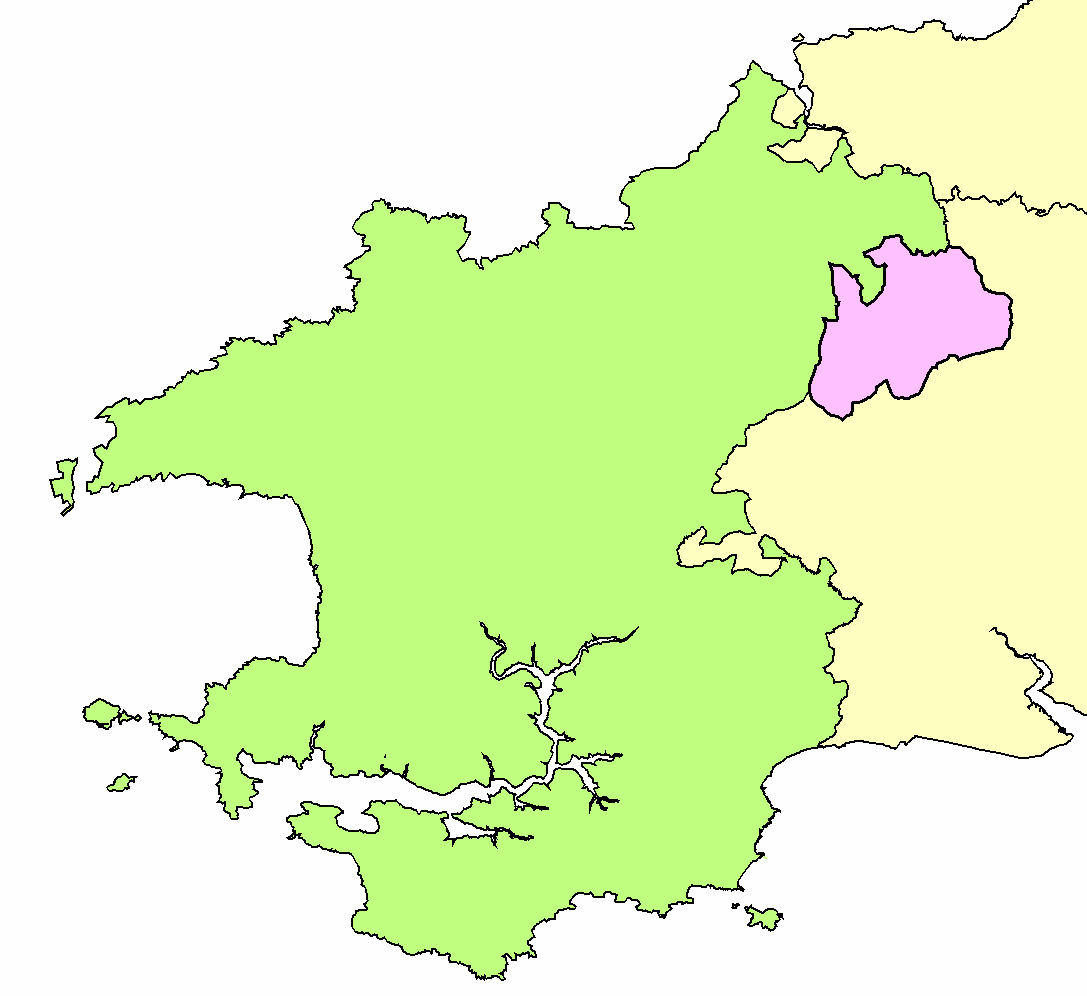
Llanfyrnach Rural District (1894-1934) in Pembrokeshire

Llanfyrnach Rural District was an administrative division of Pembrokeshire, Wales.

== Creation ==
Llanfyrnach Rural District Council was created in 1894 from the part of Newcastle in Emlyn Poor Law Union situated in Pembrokeshire and consisted of six civil parishes: Capel Colman, Castellan, Clydau, Llanfyrnach, Penrydd, and West Cilrhedyn. It continued to be administered by Newcastle Emlyn.

== Purpose ==
The Council comprised councillors and a chairman, and its responsibilities included sanitary services, sewerage, refuse collection, maintaining local roads, cemeteries, and parks, licensing of public entertainments, water supply, and housing. It became a rating authority in 1925. Rural District Councils were administered by a number of committees and by appointed officers, including a clerk, treasurer, public health inspector, housing officer, surveyor and rating officer.

== Abolition ==
The Council was abolished in 1934, when it was amalgamated with St Dogmells RD to form Cemaes RD (which itself was abolished in 1974 following local government reorganisation and its functions were assumed by Preseli Pembrokeshire District Council).

== Records ==
The records of the Council are held by Pembrokeshire Record Office in Haverfordwest.
