= Whittlesey Rural District =

Former local government area in the UK

Coordinates: 52.557°N 0.131°W

Whittlesey
- Rural district
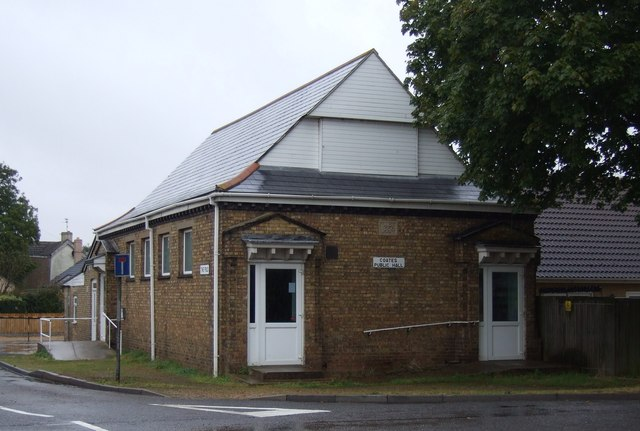

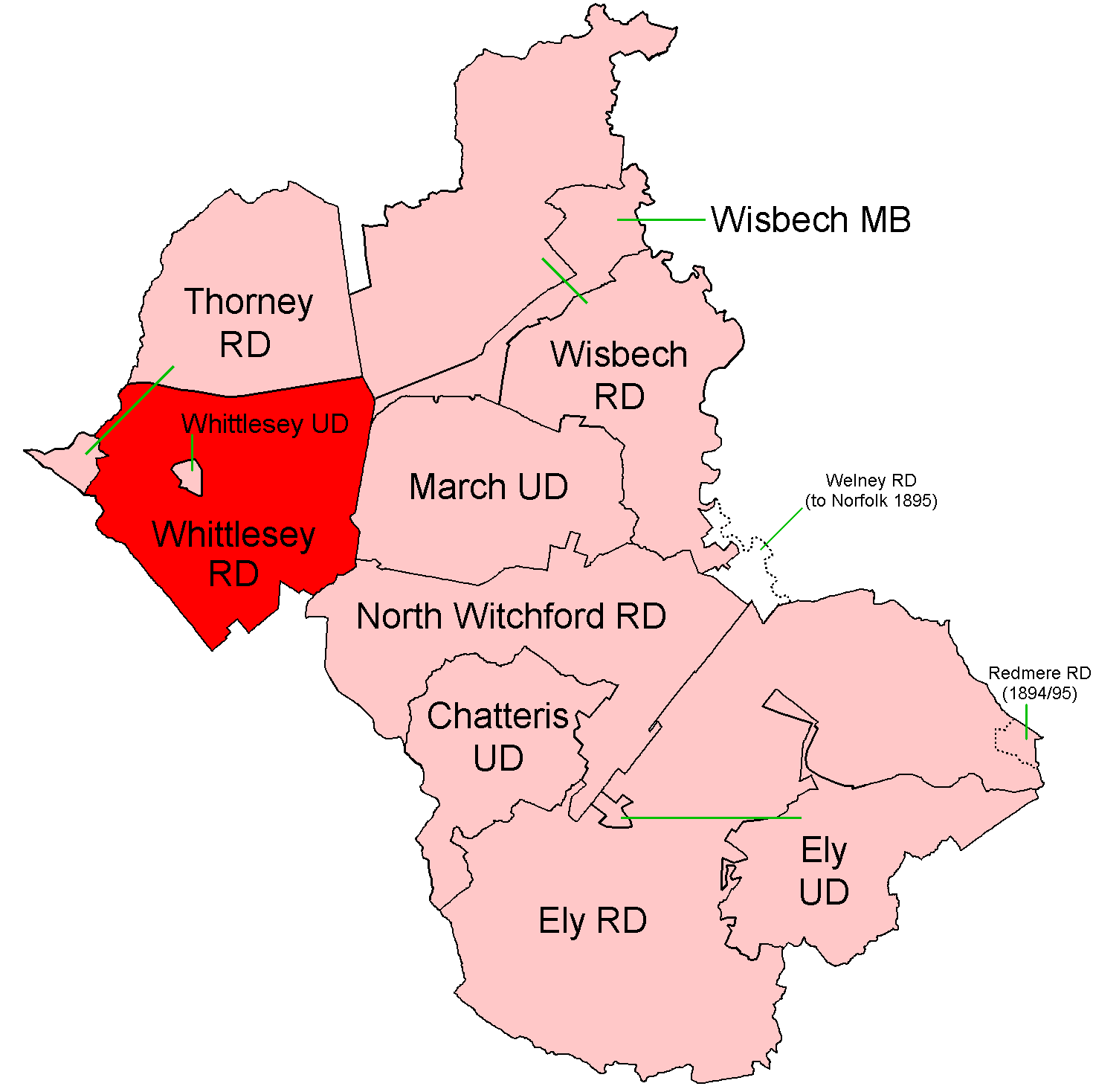
- Position within Isle of Ely
- Population
  - 1921: 3422
- History
  - Created: 1894
  - Abolished: 1926
  - Succeeded by: Whittlesey Urban District
- Contained within
  - County: Isle of Ely

Whittlesey was a rural district in the Isle of Ely from 1894 to 1926. It was created by the Local Government Act 1894 based on the Whittlesey rural sanitary district, and consisted of one civil parish – Whittlesey Rural.

The parish and district entirely surrounded the urban district of Whittlesey, which contained the parish of Whittlesey Urban.

The parish and district were both abolished in 1926, becoming part of the Whittlesey urban district and parish. At the 1921 census (the last before the abolition of the district and parish), Whittlesey Rural had a population of 3422.
