= Chipping Norton Rural District =

District in Oxfordshire, England

Coordinates: 51.9306°N 1.5393°W

- Rural district
- Population
  - 1901: 11,246
  - 1971: 18,385
- History
  - Created: 28 December 1894
  - Abolished: 31 March 1974
  - Succeeded by: West Oxfordshire
  - HQ: Chipping Norton
- Contained within
  - County Council: Oxfordshire

Chipping Norton Rural District was a rural district in Oxfordshire, England from 1894 to 1974. It surrounded but did not include the town of Chipping Norton.

== History ==
The district had its origins in the Chipping Norton Poor Law Union, which had been created in 1835, covering the town of Chipping Norton and surrounding parishes in Oxfordshire, Gloucestershire, and Warwickshire. A workhouse was built at 26 London Road in Chipping Norton to serve the area in 1836. In 1872, sanitary districts were established, with responsibility for public health and local government given to the boards of guardians of poor law unions for areas without urban authorities. The Chipping Norton Rural Sanitary District therefore covered the area of the Chipping Norton Poor Law Union except for the parish of Chipping Norton itself, which was a municipal borough and so formed its own urban sanitary district.

Under the Local Government Act 1894, rural sanitary districts became rural districts from 28 December 1894. Where rural sanitary districts straddled county boundaries, they were to be split or otherwise adjusted so that each new rural district was in one county. The Gloucestershire and Warwickshire parishes from the Chipping Norton Rural Sanitary District were therefore all transferred to the Brailes Rural District in Warwickshire.

Chipping Norton Rural District Council held its first meeting on 9 January 1895 at the workhouse in Chipping Norton, when Thomas Harris, rector of Swerford, was chosen as the council's first chairman. He had previously been the chairman of the board of guardians.

Chipping Norton Rural District was enlarged in 1932 when it took in several parishes from the disbanded Woodstock Rural District.

Chipping Norton Rural District was abolished under the Local Government Act 1972, with the area becoming part of West Oxfordshire on 1 April 1974.
