= Whitchurch Rural District, Herefordshire =

Former rural district in the UK

Coordinates: 51.85°N 2.65°W

Whitchurch was a rural district in Herefordshire, England from 1894 to 1931.

It was formed under the Local Government Act 1894 from that part of the Monmouth rural sanitary district which was in Herefordshire (the Gloucestershire part becoming part of the West Dean Rural District, the Monmouthshire part the Monmouth Rural District).

It consisted of the following parishes:

- Ganarew
- Garway
- Llanrothal
- Welsh Bicknor
- Welsh Newton
- Whitchurch

The district was abolished in 1931 under a County Review Order. It was combined with the Ross Rural District to make the Ross and Whitchurch Rural District.
