= Spalding Rural District =

Former local government area in the UK

Coordinates: 52.76°N 0.15°W

Spalding was a rural district in Holland in Lincolnshire, England from 1894 to 1974.

It was formed under the Local Government Act 1894 from the Spalding rural sanitary district. Spalding itself constituted a separate urban district.

It was expanded in 1932 under a County Review Order, by including Crowland Rural District (which consisted of a single parish).

It was abolished in 1974 under the Local Government Act 1972, going on to form part of the South Holland district.
