= Crook and Willington Urban District =

Former local government area in the UK

Coordinates: 54.710°N 1.709°W

- Urban district
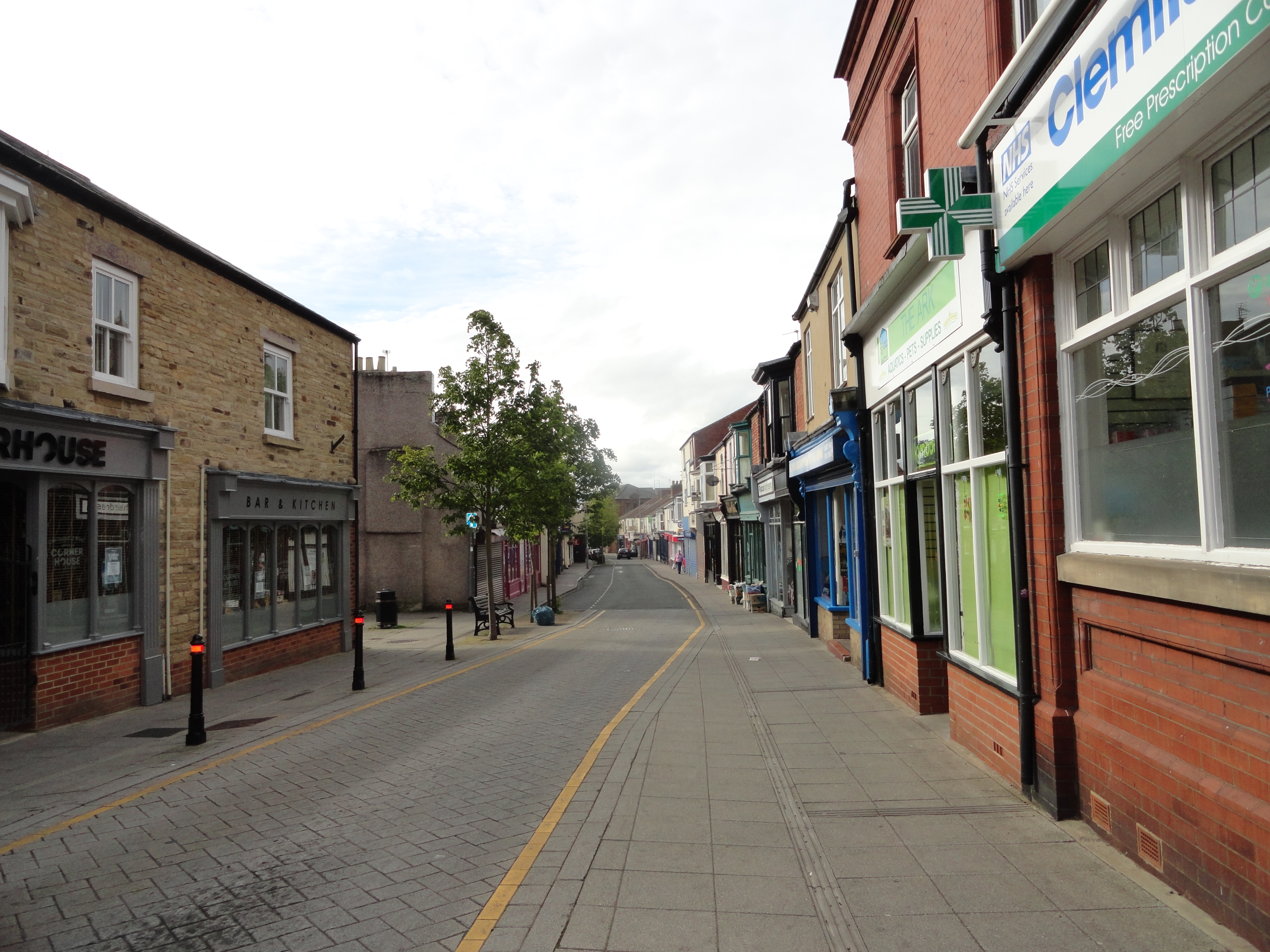
- Population
  - 1961: 25,257
- History
  - Created: 1 April 1937
  - Abolished: 31 March 1974
  - Succeeded by: Wear Valley
- Contained within
  - County: Durham

Crook and Willington was an urban district in County Durham, England, from 1937 to 1974. It was created by a merger of the previous Crook and Willington urban districts, along with part of the disbanded Auckland Rural District. It later formed part of the Wear Valley district. Today the population of this area is approximately 21,500. The area Includes Crook, Willington, Sunnybrow, Helmington Row, Billy Row and Roddymoor
