= Wear Valley =

Former local government district in County Durham, England

Coordinates: 54.716°N 1.925°W

Wear Valley District
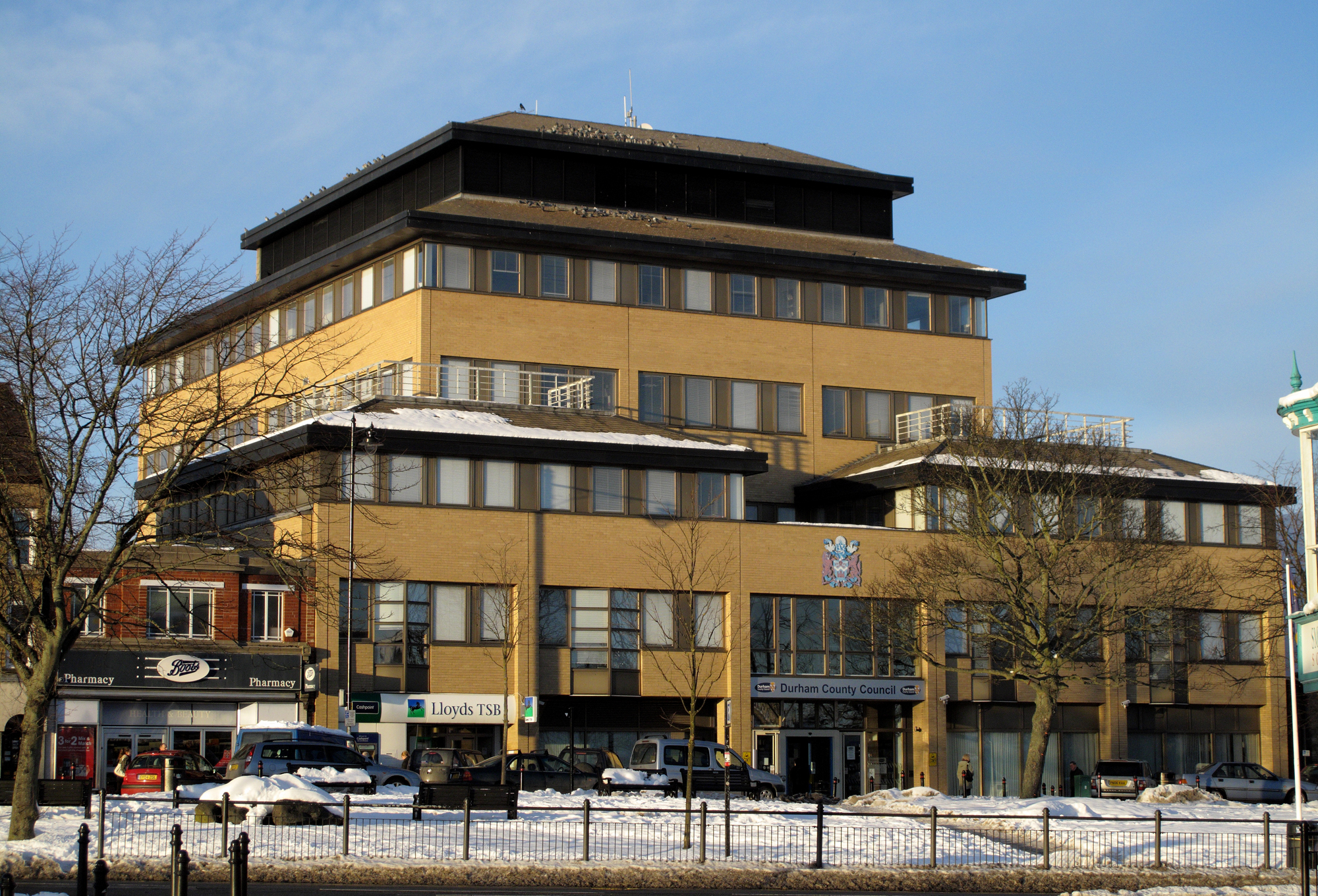
- Former district offices

- Shown within ceremonial County Durham
- History
  - Origin: Bishop Auckland Urban District; Crook and Willington Urban District; Tow Law Urban District; Weardale Rural District
  - Created: 1974
  - Abolished: 2009
  - Succeeded by: County Durham
- Status: District
- ONS code: 20UJ
- Government: Wear Valley District Council
  - HQ: Crook

Wear Valley was, from 1974 to 2009, a local government district in County Durham, England. Its council and district capital was Crook.

The district covered much of the Weardale area. In the west it was parished and rural, whereas in the east it was more urban. Crook and Willington are unparished.

The district was formed on 1 April 1974, under the Local Government Act 1972, by the merger of the Bishop Auckland, Crook and Willington and Tow Law urban districts, along with Weardale Rural District.

The district was abolished as part of the 2009 structural changes to local government in England, becoming part of the Durham County Council unitary authority.

Wear Valley had a population of around 65,000 in 2001.

== Electoral divisions ==
At the time Wear Valley District Council was abolished the electoral wards were:

- Bishop Auckland Town ward
- Cockton Hill ward
- Coundon ward
- Dene Valley ward
- Crook North ward
- Howden ward
- Tow Law and Stanley ward
- Crook South ward
- Wheatbottom and Helmington Row ward
- St John's Chapel ward
- Stanhope ward
- Wolsingham and Witton-le-Wear ward
- Escomb ward
- West Auckland ward
- Hunwick ward
- Willington Central ward
- Willington West End ward
- Henknowle ward
- Woodhouse Close ward

== Largest settlements ==
1. Bishop Auckland - 24,000

2. Crook - 13,000

3. Willington - 5,000
