= Ringwood and Fordingbridge Rural District =

Former local government area in Hampshire, England

Coordinates: 50.886°N 1.777°W

Ringwood and Fordingbridge was a rural district in Hampshire from 1932 to 1974. It was in the southwestern part of the county, on the border with Dorset, in which it bordered Wimborne and Cranborne. Within Hampshire, it bordered the New Forest, Lymington, Christchurch and Bournemouth; and within Wiltshire, which lay to its north, it bordered Salisbury and Wilton.

It was created by the merger of part of the disbanded Christchurch Rural District along with Ringwood Rural District and Fordingbridge Rural District. Its main urban centres were Ringwood and Fordingbridge.

The district was abolished in 1974 and split between the districts of New Forest, East Dorset and Christchurch, the latter two then forming part of Dorset.

== Economy ==
In 1951, the single largest industry was agriculture, forestry and fishing. Other notable industrial sectors were building and construction, and administration and military.
