= Weardale Rural District =

Former local government area in the UK

Coordinates: 54.771°N 2.004°W

Weardale was a rural district in County Durham, England from 1894 to 1974. It was formed under the Local Government Act 1894 as a successor to the Weardale rural sanitary district.

It originally consisted of the parishes of Edmondbyers, Hunstanworth, Wolsingham. It was expanded in 1937 by taking in parts of parishes in the disbanded Auckland Rural District, and also adding Stanhope which had previously been an independent urban district.

The district was abolished in 1974 under the Local Government Act 1972, and its area went to form part of the new Wear Valley district.
