= Tynemouth Rural District =

Former local government area in north east England

Coordinates: 55°4′30″N 1°33′0″W

- Area
  - 1911: 13,136 acres (53.2 km^{2})
- Population
  - 1901: 18,181
  - 1911: 23,703
- History
  - Preceded by: Tynemouth Rural Sanitary District
  - Origin: Local Government Act 1894
  - Created: 1894
  - Abolished: 1912
  - Succeeded by: Blyth Urban District; Cramlington Urban District; Longbenton Urban District; Seaton Deleval Urban District; Whitley and Monkseaton Urban District
- Status: Rural district
- Contained within
  - County: Northumberland

Tynemouth was a rural district in the English county of Northumberland.

It was created by the Local Government Act 1894 based on the Tynemouth rural sanitary district. It initially contained the following parishes:

- Backworth
- Bebside
- Burradon
- Earsdon
- East Hartford
- Hartley
- Holywell
- Horton
- Longbenton
- Murton
- Seaton Delaval
- West Hartford
- Willington

In 1897 the parishes of Backworth, Earsdon, Holywell and Murton became an Earsdon Urban District. A Camperdown parish was created in 1910 from the Weetslade urban district, also taking in part of Longbenton urban district. In 1910 Willington and part of Longbenton were added to the Municipal Borough of Wallsend.

The rural district was dissolved in 1912, being split between the Blyth, Longbenton, Whitley and Monkseaton, Seaton Delaval and Cramlington urban districts.
