= Banbury Rural District =

Former local government area in the UK

Coordinates: 52.03°N 1.43°W

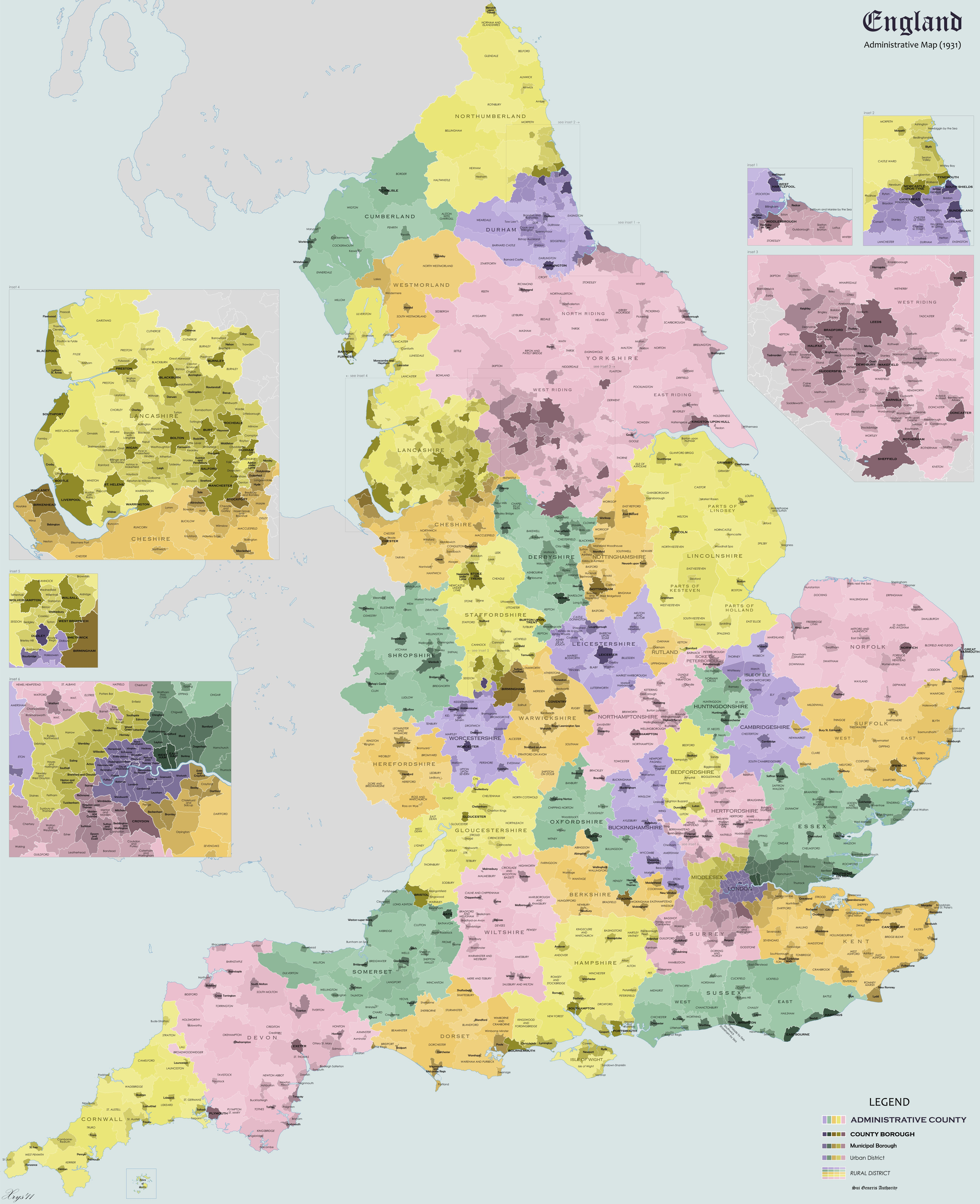
Administrative map of England in 1931

Banbury was a rural district in Oxfordshire, England from 1894 to 1974. It was formed under the Local Government Act 1894 from the bulk of the Banbury rural sanitary district, which had been divided among three counties. The Warwickshire part of the rural sanitary district (except for the Warwickshire part of the parish of Mollington, which joined Oxfordshire) formed the Farnborough Rural District, whilst the area in Northamptonshire formed the Middleton Cheney Rural District.

It covered the rural area north, west and south of Banbury. The district expanded in 1932 by taking in part of the disbanded Woodstock Rural District.

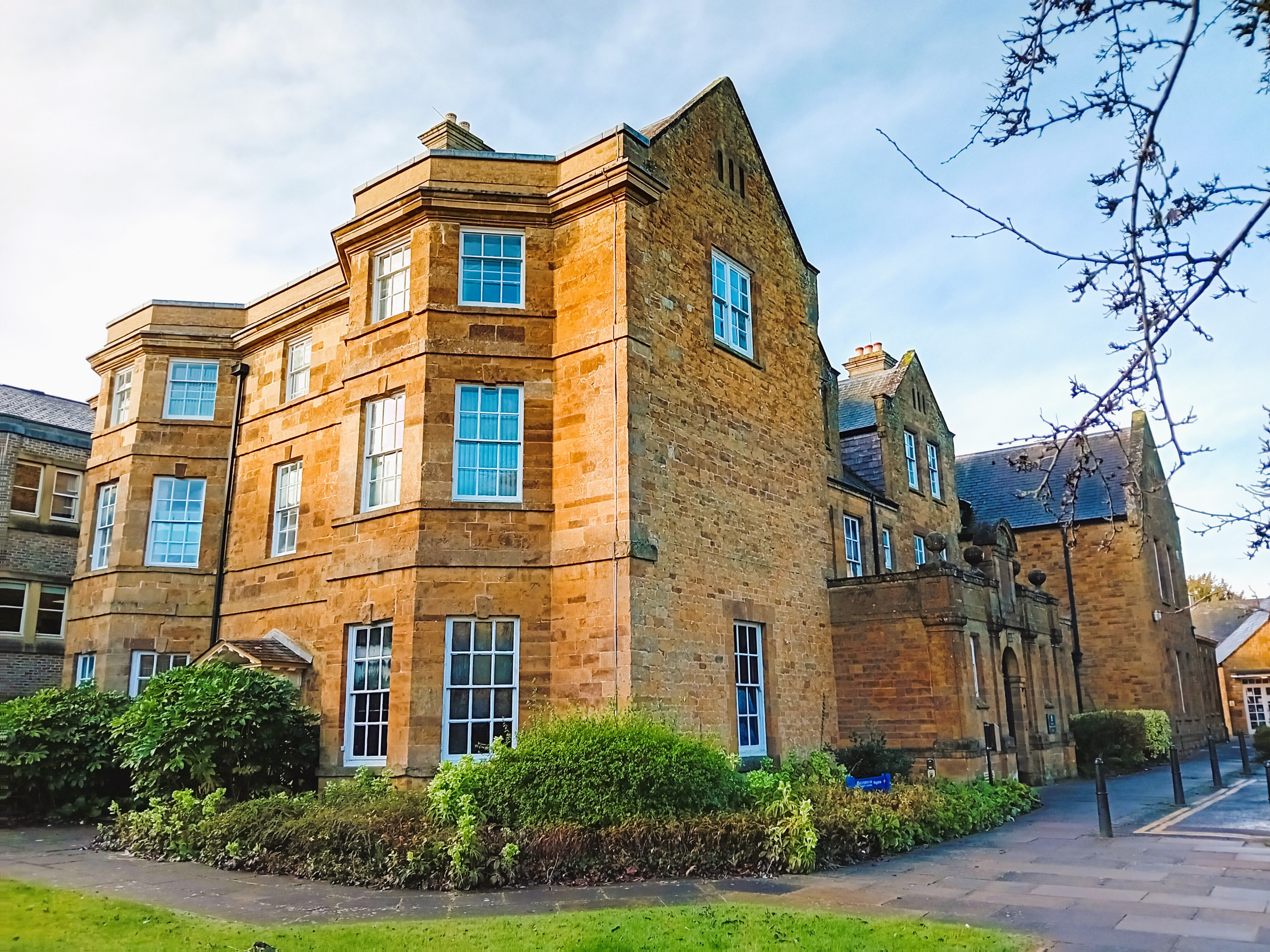
Bodicote House: Council's headquarters after 1952

Until 1952 the council was based in Banbury. In 1952 the council acquired Bodicote House to be its headquarters, being a large eighteenth century house in the village of Bodicote, immediately south of Banbury. Following the council's abolition in 1974 the building became the main offices of its successor, Cherwell District Council.

The district was abolished in 1974 under the Local Government Act 1972, and now forms part of the Cherwell district of Oxfordshire.

== See also ==
- History of Banbury
