= St Dogmells Rural District =

Former local government area in the UK

Coordinates: 52.059°N 4.744°W

St Dogmells
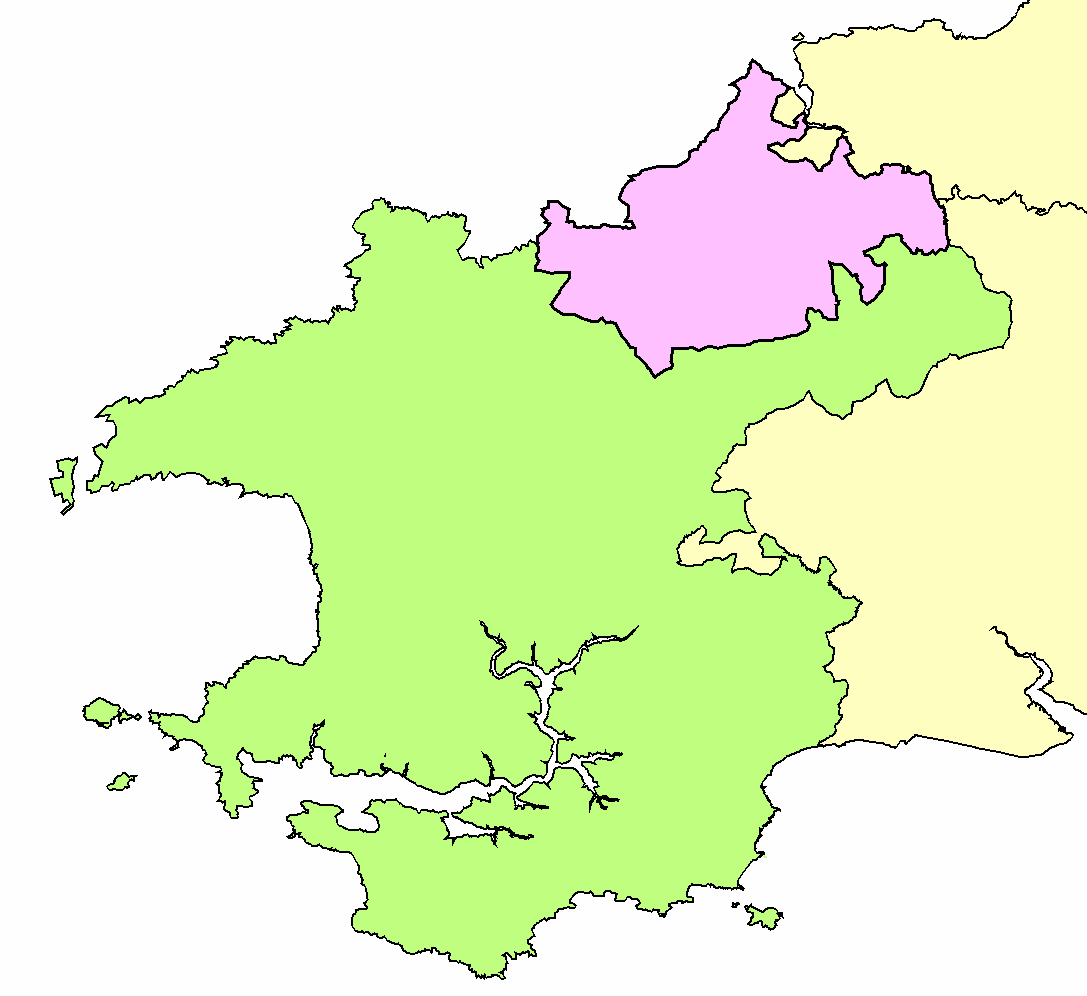
- Area
  - 1911: 58,872 acres (238.25 km^{2})
  - 1931: 58,872 acres (238.25 km^{2})
- Population
  - 1901: 8,252
  - 1931: 7,351
- History
  - Created: 1894
  - Abolished: 1934
  - Succeeded by: Cemaes Rural District
- Status: Rural District
  - HQ: Cardigan

St Dogmells was a rural district in the administrative county of Pembrokeshire, Wales from 1894 to 1934.

== Formation ==
The district was created by the Local Government Act 1894 from the part of Cardigan Rural Sanitary District in Pembrokeshire, and consisted of seventeen civil parishes (see below). It continued to be administered from Cardigan.

List of Parishes:

Parish	Parish	Parish
Bayvil	Llanfair-Nant-Gwyn	Monington
Bridell	Llanfihangel Penbedw	Moylgrove
Cilgerran	Llantood	Nevern
Dinas	Llanychlwydog	Newport
Eglwyswen	Manordeifi	St. Dogmaels Rural
Eglwyswrw	Meline

== Purpose ==
The Council comprised councillors and a chairman, and its responsibilities included sanitary services, sewerage, refuse collection, maintaining local roads, cemeteries and parks, licensing of public entertainments, water supply and housing. It became a rating authority in 1925. Rural District Councils were administered by a number of committees and by appointed officers including a Clerk, Treasurer, Public Health Inspector, Housing Officer, Surveyor and Rating Officer.

== Abolition ==
It was abolished in 1934, when a county review order amalgamated it with Llanfyrnach RD to form Cemaes RD (which itself was abolished in 1974 following local government reorganisation and its functions were assumed by Preseli Pembrokeshire District Council).

== Records ==
The records of the council are held by Pembrokeshire Record Office in Haverfordwest.
