= St Asaph (Denbigh) Rural District =

Abolished Welsh rural district

St Asaph (Denbigh)
- Area
  - 1901: 65,749 acres (266.08 km^{2})
  - 1931: 65,748 acres (266.07 km^{2})
- Population
  - 1901: 6,908
  - 1931: 7,212
- History
  - Created: 1894
  - Abolished: 1935
  - Succeeded by: Aled Rural District; Abergele Urban District
- Status: Rural District
  - HQ: St Asaph

St Asaph (Denbigh) was a rural district in the administrative county of Denbighshire from 1894 to 1935.

The rural district was formed from the parts of St Asaph Rural Sanitary Districts in Denbighshire. The remainder of the RSD, in Flintshire, became St Asaph (Flint) Rural District.

The district contained ten civil parishes:

- Abergele Rural
- Betws Abergele
- Bylchau
- Cefn
- Llanddulas
- Llanefydd
- Llanfair Talhaearn
- Llansannan
- St George
- Trefnant

St Asaph (Denbigh) Rural District was abolished by a County Review Order in 1935, most becoming part of the new Aled Rural District, and parts going to an enlarged Abergele Urban District.

== Sources ==
Denbighshire Administrative County (Vision of Britain)
