= Ogwen Rural District =

Local government area in the UK, abolished 1974

Ogwen
- Area
  - 1901: 44,058 acres (178.30 km^{2})
  - 1961: 32,526 acres (131.63 km^{2})
- Population
  - 1901: 6,593
  - 1971: 4,976
- History
  - Created: 1894
  - Abolished: 1974
  - Succeeded by: Borough of Arfon
- Status: Rural District
  - HQ: Bangor

Ogwen was a rural district in the administrative county of Caernarfonshire in Wales from 1894 to 1974.

The district was formed under the Local Government Act 1894 from the part of the former Bangor Rural Sanitary District in Caernarfonshire. The rest on the Isle of Anglesey, formed Aethwy Rural District. The district was named after the River Ogwen and Ogwen Valley.

The district contained the following civil parishes, now communities:

- Aber
- Llandygai
- Llanllechid
- Pentir

In 1894 the urban district of Bethesda was formed from part of Llanllechid parish. The rural district lost further territory under a County Review Order in 1934: parts of Llandygai and Llanlechid were transferred to Capel Curig parish in Nant Conwy Rural District, and parts of Llandygai and Pentir was included in an extension of the boundaries of the Municipal Borough of Bangor.

The rural district was abolished by the Local Government Act 1972, with its area becoming part of the Borough of Arfon, one of five districts of the new county of Gwynedd.

Ogwen Rural District, parishes, 1894

== Sources ==
- Census of England and Wales: County Report for Carnarvonshire, 1901, 1911, 1921
- Census of England and Wales: County Report for Caernarvonshire 1931
- Caernarvonshire Administrative County (Vision of Britain) "Caernarvonshire AdmC through time | Census tables with data for the Administrative County".
