= Geirionydd Rural District =

Local government area in Wales, abolished 1934

Geirionydd
- Area
  - 1901: 55,233 acres (223.52 km^{2})
  - 1931: 55,237 acres (223.54 km^{2})
- Population
  - 1901: 4,864
  - 1931: 4,114
- History
  - Created: 1894
  - Abolished: 1934
  - Succeeded by: Nant Conway Rural District
- Status: Rural District
  - HQ: Llanrwst

Geirionydd was a rural district in the administrative county of Caernarvonshire, North Wales from 1894 to 1934.

The rural district was formed from the part of Llanrwst Rural Sanitary District in Caernarvonshire. It was initially called the "Bettws-y-Coed Rural District" (using the old spelling for the name of Betws-y-Coed). After that parish was removed from the district in 1898 to become its own urban district, the residual rural district was renamed after Llyn Geirionydd.

The district contained the following civil parishes:

- The Abbey
- Capel Curig: Created 1904 from parts of Gwydir and Llanrhychwyn parishes
- Dolwyddelan
- Eidda
- Gwydir: Lost areas in 1901 to Bettws Y Coed Urban District, and in 1904 to create Capel Curig parish. Absorbed by Llanrhychwyn in 1905.
- Llanrhychwyn: Lost area in 1904 to create Capel Curig parish. Absorbed Gwydir parish in 1905
- Maenan
- Penmachno
- Trefriw

The rural district was abolished by a County Review Order in 1934, becoming part of Nant Conway Rural District.

Betwsycoed Rural District, 1894-98, civil parishes

Geirionydd Rural District, 1905-34, civil parishes

== Sources ==
- Census of England and Wales: County Report for Carnarvonshire, 1901, 1911, 1921
- Census of England and Wales: County Report for Caernarvonshire 1931
- Caernarvonshire Administrative County (Vision of Britain)
