= Cemaes Rural District =

Former local government area in the UK

Coordinates: 52.038°N 4.569°W

Cemaes
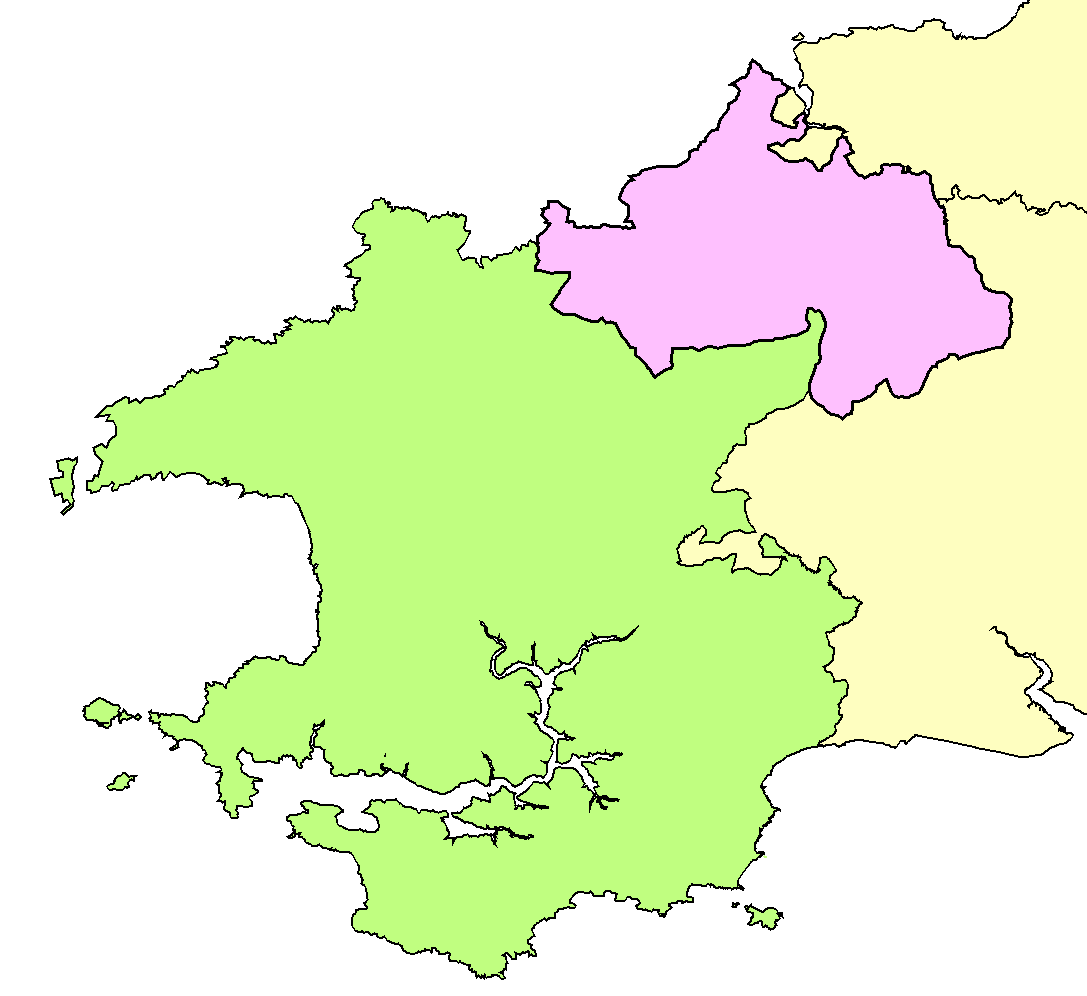
- History
  - Created: 1 April 1934
  - Abolished: 31 March 1974
  - Succeeded by: Preseli
- Status: Rural District
  - HQ: Cardigan

Cemaes Rural District was an administrative subdivision of Pembrokeshire, Wales from 1934 to 1974.

== Name ==
The district's name is that of its northernmost point, the promontory Cemaes Head, though it may also hark back to the Cantref of Cemais, which existed from Norman times, and as the Hundred of Cemais from the 16th century.

== Formation ==
Cemaes Rural District was formed in 1934 by the amalgamation of St Dogmells Rural District and Llanfyrnach Rural District. The council was administered from Cardigan, outside its area.

== Purpose ==
The Council comprised councillors and a chairman, and its responsibilities included sanitary services, sewerage, refuse collection, maintaining local roads, cemeteries and parks, licensing of public entertainments, water supply and housing. It became a rating authority in 1925. Rural District Councils were administered by a number of committees and by appointed officers including a Clerk, Treasurer, Public Health Inspector, Housing Officer, Surveyor and Rating Officer.

== Abolition ==
It was abolished in 1974, when it was absorbed into the Preseli District of Dyfed.
