= Repton Rural District =

Former local government area in the UK

Coordinates: 52°49′N 1°33′W

- Rural District
- Location within Derbyshire
- Country: England
- County: Derbyshire
- Established: 1894

Government
  - Type: Local Government District
  - Body: Repton Rural District Council

Repton was a rural district in Derbyshire, England from 1894 to 1974.

It was created under the Local Government Act 1894 from the part of the Burton upon Trent rural sanitary district which was in Derbyshire (the Staffordshire part becoming Tutbury Rural District).

In 1934, under a County Review Order, it was expanded somewhat by taking in the disbanded Hartshorne and Seals Rural District.

It continued in existence until 1974, when it was abolished under the Local Government Act 1972, going on to form part of the new South Derbyshire district.
