= East Westmorland Rural District =

Former local government area in the UK

Coordinates: 54.5°N 2.4°W

East Westmorland was the name of a rural district in the administrative county of Westmorland from 1894 to 1935. The district was created by the Local Government Act 1894 based on the former East Ward rural sanitary district, and therefore indirectly on the former East Ward of Westmorland.

The district entirely surrounded the municipal borough of Appleby, situated in the north-west of the district. Settlements in the district included Kirkby Stephen and Brough under Stainmore.

In 1935, under a County Review Order, it became part of the North Westmorland Rural District.
