= Kidderminster Rural District =

Historical rural district

Coordinates: 52.389°N 2.255°W

Kidderminster Rural District was a Rural District in Worcestershire, England until 1974 when it was abolished under the Local Government Act 1972, becoming part of the new Wyre Forest District, together with the boroughs of Kidderminster and Bewdley and Stourport-on-Severn urban district.
