= Middleton Cheney Rural District =

Former local government area in the UK

Coordinates: 52.1°N 1.25°W

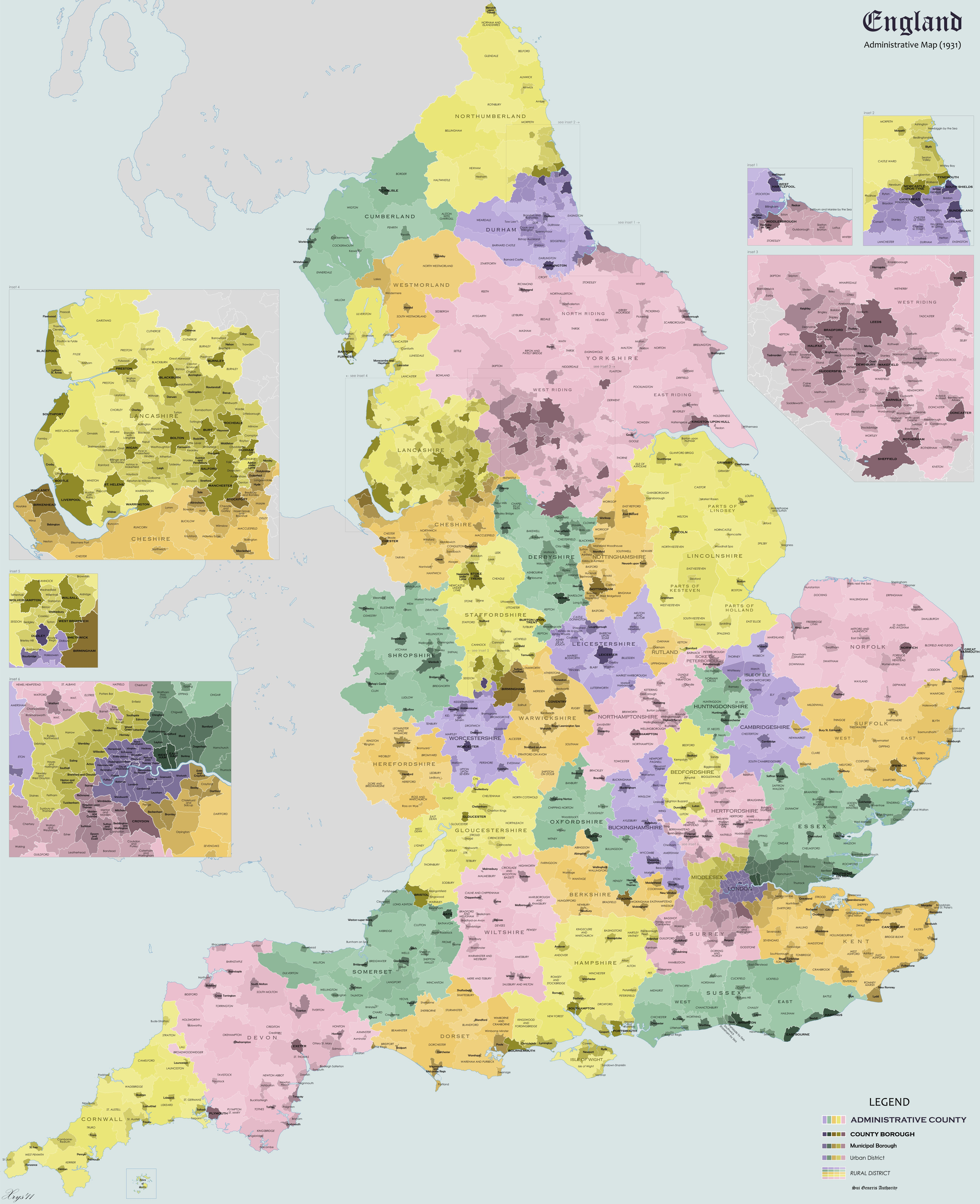
Administrative map of England in 1931.

Middleton Cheney was a rural district in Northamptonshire, England from 1894 to 1935.

It was formed under the Local Government Act 1894 from that part of the Banbury rural sanitary district which was in Northamptonshire (the main part in Oxfordshire becoming the Banbury Rural District). It was named after the village of Middleton Cheney.

The district was abolished in 1935 under a County Review Order, and its area added to the existing Brackley Rural District.

== See also ==
- History of Banbury
