= North Westmorland Rural District =

Historical rural district

Coordinates: 54.589°N 2.518°W

North Westmorland was a rural district in Westmorland, England from 1935 to 1974. It now forms part of the Eden district of Cumbria. It was formed in 1935 by the merger of the East Westmorland Rural District, Shap urban district and most of West Ward Rural District.

The district entirely surrounded the Appleby municipal borough.
