= Ashbourne Rural District =

Former local government area in the UK

Coordinates: 53.016°N 1.731°W

Ashbourne
- Ashbourne Rural District shown within Derbyshire in 1970.
- Area
  - 1911: 70,380 acres (284.8 km^{2})
  - 1961: 86,188 acres (348.79 km^{2})
- Population
  - 1911: 10,294
  - 1961: 11,286
- History
  - Created: 1894
  - Abolished: 1974
  - Succeeded by: West Derbyshire
- Status: Rural district
- Government: Ashbourne Rural District Council

Ashbourne was a Rural District in Derbyshire, England from 1894 to 1974. It was created under the Local Government Act 1894.

It was enlarged in 1934 when Sudbury Rural District was abolished and amalgamated into the district.

The district was abolished in 1974 under the Local Government Act 1972 and combined with various other local government districts of western Derbyshire to form the new West Derbyshire district (subsequently renamed Derbyshire Dales).
