= Nant Conwy Rural District =

Rural district in Wales (1934–1974)

Coordinates: 53.137°N 3.795°W

Nant Conwy Nant Conway (1934–1972)
- History
  - Created: 1934
  - Abolished: 1974
  - Succeeded by: Borough of Aberconwy
- Status: Rural District
  - HQ: Llanrwst

Nant Conwy was a rural district in the administrative county of Caernarfonshire from 1934 to 1974. The district was formed by a County Review Order, combining the areas of Geirionydd Rural District with most of Conwy Rural District and part of Ogwen Rural District. The name is derived from Nant Conwy, an historic cwmwd of the Kingdom of Gwynedd in the cantref of Arllechwedd.

Nant Conway Rural District, civil parishes 1934-74

The district contained the following civil parishes:

- Caerhun^{(1)}
- Capel Curig^{(2)} (absorbed parts of Llandegai and Llanllechid^{(3)})
- Dolgarrog^{(1)} (absorbed Maenan Abbey parish^{(2)})
- Dolwyddelan^{(2)}
- Eidda^{(2)}
- Henryd (created 1934 from merger of Llangelynnin and Llechwedd parishes^{(1)})
- Llanbedrycennin^{(1)}
- Llanrhychwyn^{(2)}
- Maenan^{(2)}
- Penmachno^{(2)}
- Trefriw^{(2)}

^{(1)} Formerly in Conwy Rural District

^{(2)} formerly in Geirionydd Rural District

^{(3)} Formerly in Ogwen Rural District

From its creation in 1934 until 1972 the district's name was spelled "Nant Conway". The change to "Nant Conwy" took effect on 1 December 1972 after a vote by the council, following the example of the neighbouring town of Conwy which had changed the official spelling of its name in August 1972.

In 1974 the rural district was abolished, with its area becoming part of the Borough of Aberconwy, one of five districts of the new county of Gwynedd.
