= Conwy Rural District =

Rural district in Wales (1894–1934)

Conwy
- Area
  - 1901: 26,135 acres (105.76 km^{2})
  - 1931: 23,883 acres (96.65 km^{2})
- Population
  - 1901: 6,364
  - 1931: 4,529
- History
  - Created: 1894
  - Abolished: 1934
  - Succeeded by: Nant Conwy Rural District
- Status: Rural District
  - HQ: Conwy

Conwy was a rural district in the administrative county of Caernarfonshire, North Wales, from 1894 to 1934.

The rural district had the same area as the Conwy Rural Sanitary District, created in 1875.

The district contained the following civil parishes:

- Caerhun
- Dolgarrog
- Llanbedr y Cennin
- Llangelynin
- Llangwstenin ^{(1)}
- Llechwedd
- Llysfaen (Detached part of the county) ^{(2)}
- Penrhyn ^{(1)}

^{(1)}In 1928 the borough of Conwy was enlarged to take in parts of Llangwstenin and Penrhyn parishes.

^{(2)}In 1923 Llysfaen was transferred to the administrative county of Denbighshire, forming part of Colwyn Bay urban district.

Conwy Rural District was abolished by a County Review Order on 1 April 1934. Caerhun, Dolgarrog, Llanbedr Y Cennin, Llangelynin, and Llechwedd became part of a new Nant Conwy Rural District, while Llangwstenin and Penrhyn parishes were both abolished, with their areas being split up to become parts of the enlarged Municipal Borough of Conwy and Llandudno Urban District.

Conwy Rural District, civil parishes, 1894

== Sources ==
- Census of England and Wales: County Report for Carnarvonshire, 1901, 1911, 1921
- Census of England and Wales: County Report for Caernarvonshire 1931
- Caernarvonshire Administrative County (Vision of Britain)
