= Kington Rural District =

Former district in Herefordshire, England

Coordinates: 52.203°N 3.031°W

- Rural district
- Area
  - 1911: 44,031 acres (178.2 km^{2})
  - 1961: 45,544 acres (184.3 km^{2})
- Population
  - 1901: 5,245
  - 1971: 3,910
- History
  - Created: 28 December 1894
  - Abolished: 31 March 1974
  - Succeeded by: Leominster
  - HQ: Kington

Kington Rural District was a rural district in the administrative county of Herefordshire, England from 1894 to 1974, covering an area in the west of the county.

== Origins ==
The district had its origins in the Kington Poor Law Union, which had been created in 1836, covering the small town of Kington and several surrounding parishes. In 1872 sanitary districts were established, giving public health and local government responsibilities for rural areas to the existing boards of guardians of poor law unions. The Kington Rural Sanitary District therefore covered the area of the poor law union except for the town of Kington, which had improvement commissioners and so became its own urban sanitary district. The Kington Rural Sanitary District was administered from Kington Union Workhouse, which had been built in 1837 on Kingswood Road in Kington.

Under the Local Government Act 1894, rural sanitary districts became rural districts from 28 December 1894.

Kington Rural District was abolished under the Local Government Act 1972, with the area becoming part of Leominster District on 1 April 1974.
