= Civil parishes in Cornwall =

Subdivisions of English county

A blank map of mainland Cornwall showing civil parish boundaries

A civil parish is a country subdivision, forming the lowest unit of local government in England. There are 218 civil parishes in the ceremonial county of Cornwall, which includes the Isles of Scilly. The county is effectively parished in its entirety; only the unpopulated Wolf Rock is unparished. At the 2001 census, there were 501,267 people living in the current parishes, accounting for the whole of the county's population. The final unparished areas of mainland Cornwall, around St Austell, were parished on 1 April 2009 to coincide with the structural changes to local government in England.

Population sizes within the county vary considerably, Falmouth is the most populous with a population of 26,767, recorded in 2011, and St Michael's Mount the least with 29 residents. The county is governed by two separate unitary authorities; Cornwall Council covers mainland Cornwall, while the Isles of Scilly are administered by their own unitary authority.

== History ==
Parishes arose from Church of England divisions, and were originally purely ecclesiastical. Over time, they acquired civil administration powers.

The Highways Act 1555 made parishes responsible for the upkeep of roads. Every adult inhabitant of the parish was obliged to work four days a year on the roads, providing their own tools, carts and horses; the work was overseen by an unpaid local appointee, the Surveyor of Highways.

The poor were looked after by the monasteries, until their dissolution. In 1572, magistrates were given power to 'survey the poor' and impose taxes for their relief. This system was made more formal by the Poor Law Act 1601, which made parishes responsible for administering the Poor Law; overseers were appointed to charge a rate to support the poor of the parish. The 19th century saw an increase in the responsibility of parishes, although the Poor Law powers were transferred to Poor Law Unions. The Public Health Act 1872 grouped parishes into Rural Sanitary Districts, based on the Poor Law Unions; these subsequently formed the basis for rural districts.

Parishes were run by vestries, meeting annually to appoint officials, and were generally identical to ecclesiastical parishes, although some townships in large parishes administered the Poor Law themselves. Under the Divided Parishes and Poor Law Amendment Act 1882, all extra-parochial areas and townships that levied a separate rate became independent civil parishes.

Civil parishes in their modern sense date from the Local Government Act 1894, which abolished vestries; established elected parish councils in all rural parishes with more than 300 electors; grouped rural parishes into Rural Districts; and aligned parish boundaries with county and borough boundaries. Urban civil parishes continued to exist, and were generally coterminous with the urban district, municipal borough or county borough in which they were situated. Many large towns contained a number of parishes, and these were usually merged into one. Parish councils were not formed in urban areas, and the only function of the parish was to elect guardians to Poor Law Unions. With the abolition of the Poor Law system in 1930 the parishes had only a nominal existence.

The Local Government Act 1972 retained civil parishes in rural areas, and many former urban districts and municipal Boroughs that were being abolished, were replaced by new successor parishes. Urban areas that were considered too large to be single parishes became unparished areas.

== Current position ==
Recent governments have encouraged the formation of town and parish councils in unparished areas. The Local Government and Rating Act 1997 gave local residents the right to demand the creation of a new civil parish.

A parish council can become a town council unilaterally, simply by resolution. A civil parish can also gain city status, but only if that is granted by the Crown. The chairman of a town or city council is called a mayor. The Local Government and Public Involvement in Health Act 2007 introduced alternative names: a parish council can now choose to be called a community; village; or neighbourhood council.

Within Cornwall, the 2007 Act lead to the abolition of the six district councils and Cornwall County Council, establishing in their place the single unitary authority, Cornwall Council. All civil parish councils became the responsibility of this authority. At the same time, four new civil parishes were created in the St Austell area, parishing the last remaining populated part of the county.

Civil parishes with town or city status

== List of civil parishes and unparished area ==
| Image | Name Cornish name | Status | Population | District | Former local council^{[A]} | Refs |
|---|---|---|---|---|---|---|
| | Advent; Sen Adhwynn | Civil parish | 153 | Cornwall; Kernow | Camelford; Rural District | |
| | Altarnun; Alternonn | Civil parish | 976 | Cornwall; Kernow | Launceston; Rural District | |
| | Antony; Trevanta | Civil parish | 436 | Cornwall; Kernow | St Germans; Rural District | |
| | Blisland; Blyslann | Civil parish | 565 | Cornwall; Kernow | Wadebridge and Padstow; Rural District | |
| | Boconnoc; Boskennek | Civil parish | 121 | Cornwall; Kernow | Liskeard; Rural District | |
| | Bodmin; Bosvenegh | Town | 12,881 | Cornwall; Kernow | Bodmin; Municipal Borough | |
| | Botusfleming; Bosflumyes | Civil parish | 783 | Cornwall; Kernow | St Germans; Rural District | |
| | Boyton; Trevoya | Civil parish | 378 | Cornwall; Kernow | Launceston; Rural District | |
| | Breage; Eglosbrek | Civil parish | 2,955 | Cornwall; Kernow | Kerrier; Rural District | |
| | Braddock; Brodhek | Civil parish | 124 | Cornwall; Kernow | Launceston; Rural District | |
| | Bryher; Breyer | Civil parish | 92 | Isles of Scilly; Enesek Syllan | Isles of Scilly; Rural District | |
| | Bude–Stratton; Bud–Strasnedh | Town | 9,242 | Cornwall; Kernow | Bude–Stratton; Urban District | |
| | Budock; Budhek | Civil parish | 1,399 | Cornwall; Kernow | Kerrier; Rural District | |
| | Callington; Kelliwik | Town | 4,783 | Cornwall; Kernow | St Germans; Rural District | |
| | Calstock; Kalstok | Civil parish | 6,095 | Cornwall; Kernow | St Germans; Rural District | |
| | Camborne; Kammbronn | Town | 20,010 | Cornwall; Kernow | Camborne–Redruth; Urban District | |
| | Camelford; Ryskammel | Town | 2,256 | Cornwall; Kernow | Camelford; Rural District | |
| | Cardinham; Kardhinan | Civil parish | 588 | Cornwall; Kernow | Wadebridge and Padstow; Rural District | |
| | Carharrack; Karardhek | Civil parish | 1,324 | Cornwall; Kernow | Camborne–Redruth; Urban District | |
| | Carlyon | Civil parish | 1,333 | Cornwall; Kernow | St Austell with Fowey; Municipal Borough | |
| | Carn Brea; Carn Bre | Civil parish | 7,466 | Cornwall; Kernow | Camborne–Redruth; Urban District | |
| | Chacewater; Dowr an Chas | Civil parish | 1,517 | Cornwall; Kernow | Truro; Rural District | |
| | Colan; Kolan | Civil parish | 1,766 | Cornwall; Kernow | St Austell; Rural District | |
| | Constantine; Lanngostentin | Civil parish | 1,705 | Cornwall; Kernow | Kerrier; Rural District | |
| | Crantock; Lanngorrow | Civil parish | 764 | Cornwall; Kernow | Newquay; Urban District | |
| | Crowan; Egloskrowenn | Civil parish | 2,375 | Cornwall; Kernow | Kerrier; Rural District | |
| | Cubert; Lannowynn | Civil parish | 1,155 | Cornwall; Kernow | Truro; Rural District | |
| | Cury; Egloskuri | Civil parish | 388 | Cornwall; Kernow | Kerrier; Rural District | |
| | Davidstow; Lanndhewi | Civil parish | 470 | Cornwall; Kernow | Camelford; Rural District | |
| | Delabole; Delyow Boll | Civil parish | | Cornwall; Kernow | Camelford; Rural District | |
| | Deviock | Civil parish | 1,341 | Cornwall; Kernow | St Germans; Rural District | |
| | Dobwalls; Fos an Mogh | Civil parish | 1,939 (Dobwalls and Trewidland boundaries) | Cornwall; Kernow | Liskeard; Rural District | |
| | Duloe; Dewlogh | Civil parish | 660 | Cornwall; Kernow | Liskeard; Rural District | |
| | Egloshayle; Eglosheyle | Civil parish | 371 | Cornwall; Kernow | Wadebridge and Padstow; Rural District | |
| | Egloskerry; Egloskeri | Civil parish | 374 | Cornwall; Kernow | Launceston; Rural District | |
| | Falmouth; Aberfal | Town | 26,767 | Cornwall; Kernow | Falmouth; Municipal Borough | |
| | Feock; Lannfiek | Civil parish | 3,505 | Cornwall; Kernow | Truro; Rural District | |
| | Forrabury and Minster | Civil parish | 888 | Cornwall; Kernow | Camelford; Rural District | |
| | Fowey; Fowydh | Town | 2,273 | Cornwall; Kernow | St Austell with Fowey; Municipal Borough | |
| | Germoe; Germow | Civil parish | 508 | Cornwall; Kernow | Kerrier; Rural District | |
| | Gerrans; Gerens | Civil parish | 933 | Cornwall; Kernow | Truro; Rural District | |
| | Grade–Ruan | Civil parish | 1,070 | Cornwall; Kernow | Kerrier; Rural District | |
| | Grampound with Creed; Ponsmeur a'byth Sen Krida | Civil parish | 638 | Cornwall; Kernow | St Austell; Rural District | |
| | Gunwalloe; Gwynnwalow | Civil parish | 221 | Cornwall; Kernow | Kerrier; Rural District | |
| | Gweek; Gwig | Civil parish | 581 | Cornwall; Kernow | Kerrier; Rural District | |
| | Gwennap; Lanwenep | Civil parish | 1,501 | Cornwall; Kernow | Truro; Rural District | |
| | Gwinear–Gwithian; Sen Gwynnyer– Sen Goedhyan | Civil parish | 3,032 | Cornwall; Kernow | West Penwith; Rural District | |
| | Hayle; Heyl | Town | 8,317 | Cornwall; Kernow | West Penwith; Rural District | |
| | Helland; Hellann | Civil parish | 205 | Cornwall; Kernow | Wadebridge and Padstow; Rural District | |
| | Helston; Hellys | Town | 9,780 | Cornwall; Kernow | Helston; Municipal Borough | |
| | Illogan; Egloshal | Civil parish | 5,585 | Cornwall; Kernow | Camborne–Redruth; Urban District | |
| | Jacobstow; Lannjago | Civil parish | 421 | Cornwall; Kernow | Stratton; Rural District | |
| | Kea; Sen Ke | Civil parish | 1,516 | Cornwall; Kernow | Truro; Rural District | |
| | Kenwyn; Keynwynn | Civil parish | 4,944 | Cornwall; Kernow | Truro; Rural District | |
| | Kilkhampton; Tregylgh | Civil parish | 1,193 | Cornwall; Kernow | Stratton; Rural District | |
| | Ladock; Egloslasek | Civil parish | 1,522 | Cornwall; Kernow | Truro; Rural District | |
| | Landewednack; Lanndewynnek | Civil parish | 886 | Cornwall; Kernow | Kerrier; Rural District | |
| | Landrake with St Erney; Lannergh a'byth Sen Erney | Civil parish | 1,001 | Cornwall; Kernow | St Germans; Rural District | |
| | Landulph; Lanndhelek | Civil parish | 485 | Cornwall; Kernow | St Germans; Rural District | |
| | Laneast; Lannast | Civil parish | 164 | Cornwall; Kernow | Launceston; Rural District | |
| | Lanhydrock; Lannhydrek | Civil parish | 171 | Cornwall; Kernow | Wadebridge and Padstow; Rural District | |
| | Lanivet; Lanneves | Civil parish | 1,844 | Cornwall; Kernow | Wadebridge and Padstow; Rural District | |
| | Lanlivery; Lannlivri | Civil parish | 492 | Cornwall; Kernow | St Austell; Rural District | |
| | Lanner; Lannergh | Civil parish | 2,493 | Cornwall; Kernow | Camborne–Redruth; Urban District | |
| | Lanreath; Lannreydhow | Civil parish | 514 | Cornwall; Kernow | Liskeard; Rural District | |
| | Lanteglos; Nanseglos | Civil parish | 994 | Cornwall; Kernow | Liskeard; Rural District | |
| | Launcells; Lannseles | Civil parish | 563 | Cornwall; Kernow | Stratton; Rural District | |
| | Launceston; Lannstefan | Town | 7,135 | Cornwall; Kernow | Launceston; Municipal Borough | |
| | Lawhitton Rural; Nansgwydhenn | Civil parish | 270 | Cornwall; Kernow | Launceston; Rural District | |
| | Lesnewth; Lysnowydh | Civil parish | 68 | Cornwall; Kernow | Camelford; Rural District | |
| | Lewannick; Lannwenek | Civil parish | 884 | Cornwall; Kernow | Launceston; Rural District | |
| | Lezant; Lannsans | Civil parish | 751 | Cornwall; Kernow | Launceston; Rural District | |
| | Linkinhorne; Lanngynhorn | Civil parish | 1,471 | Cornwall; Kernow | Liskeard; Rural District | |
| | Liskeard; Lyskerrys | Town | 8,656 | Cornwall; Kernow | Liskeard; Municipal Borough | |
| | Looe; Logh | Town | 5,280 | Cornwall; Kernow | Looe; Urban District | |
| | Lostwithiel; Lostwydhyel | Town | 2,739 | Cornwall; Kernow | St Austell; Rural District | |
| | Ludgvan; Ludewan | Civil parish | 3,184 | Cornwall; Kernow | West Penwith; Rural District | |
| | Luxulyan; Lansulien | Civil parish | 1,371 | Cornwall; Kernow | St Austell; Rural District | |
| | Mabe; Lannvab | Civil parish | 1,276 | Cornwall; Kernow | Kerrier; Rural District | |
| | Madron; Eglosvadern | Civil parish | 1,533 | Cornwall; Kernow | West Penwith; Rural District | |
| | Maker-with-Rame; Magor a-berth Hordh | Civil parish | 1,071 | Cornwall; Kernow | St Germans; Rural District | |
| | Manaccan; Managhan | Civil parish | 299 | Cornwall; Kernow | Kerrier; Rural District | |
| | Marazion; Marghasyow | Town | 1,466 | Cornwall; Kernow | West Penwith; Rural District | |
| | Marhamchurch; Eglosvarwenn | Civil parish | 754 | Cornwall; Kernow | Stratton; Rural District | |
| | Mawgan-in-Meneage; Sen Mowgan | Civil parish | 1,117 | Cornwall; Kernow | Kerrier; Rural District | |
| | Mawgan-in-Pydar; Lanherne | Civil parish | 1,176 | Cornwall; Kernow | St Austell; Rural District | |
| | Mawnan; Sen Mownan | Civil parish | 1,454 | Cornwall; Kernow | Kerrier; Rural District | |
| | Menheniot; Mahunyes | Civil parish | 1,605 | Cornwall; Kernow | Liskeard; Rural District | |
| | Mevagissey; Lannvorek | Civil parish | 2,221 | Cornwall; Kernow | St Austell with Fowey; Municipal Borough | |
| | Michaelstow; Lannvighal | Civil parish | 199 | Cornwall; Kernow | Camelford; Rural District | |
| | Millbrook; Govermelin | Civil parish | 2,033 | Cornwall; Kernow | St Germans; Rural District | |
| | Morvah; Morvedh | Civil parish | 79 | Cornwall; Kernow | West Penwith; Rural District | |
| | Morval; Morval | Civil parish | 616 | Cornwall; Kernow | Liskeard; Rural District | |
| | Morwenstow; Lannvorwenna | Civil parish | 768 | Cornwall; Kernow | Stratton; Rural District | |
| | Mullion; Eglosvelyan | Civil parish | 1,986 | Cornwall; Kernow | Kerrier; Rural District | |
| | Mylor; Lannwydhek | Civil parish | 2,533 | Cornwall; Kernow | Truro; Rural District | |
| | Newquay; Tewyn Plustry | Town | 19,423 | Cornwall; Kernow | Newquay; Urban District | |
| | North Hill; Bre Gledh | Civil parish | 917 | Cornwall; Kernow | Launceston; Rural District | |
| | North Petherwin; Paderwynn Gledh | Civil parish | 777 | Cornwall; Kernow | Launceston; Rural District | |
| | North Tamerton; Tre war Damer | Civil parish | 288 | Cornwall; Kernow | Stratton; Rural District | |
| | Otterham; Prasdowrgi | Civil parish | 228 | Cornwall; Kernow | Camelford; Rural District | |
| | Padstow; Lannwedhenek | Town | 3,162 | Cornwall; Kernow | Wadebridge and Padstow; Rural District | |
| | Pelynt; Plunennys | Civil parish | 1,124 | Cornwall; Kernow | Liskeard; Rural District | |
| | Penryn; Penrynn | Town | 7,166 | Cornwall; Kernow | Penryn; Municipal Borough | |
| | Pentewan Valley | Civil parish | 542 | Cornwall; Kernow | St Austell with Fowey; Municipal Borough | |
| | Penzance; Pensans | Town | 21,168 | Cornwall; Kernow | Penzance; Municipal Borough | |
| | Perranarworthal; Pyran ar Woethel | Civil parish | 1,558 | Cornwall; Kernow | Truro; Rural District | |
| | Perranuthnoe; Pyranudhno | Civil parish | 2,200 | Cornwall; Kernow | West Penwith; Rural District | |
| | Perranzabuloe; Pyran yn Treth | Civil parish | 5,382 | Cornwall; Kernow | Truro; Rural District | |
| | Philleigh; Eglosros | Civil parish | 159 | Cornwall; Kernow | Truro; Rural District | |
| | Pillaton; Trebeulyow | Civil parish | 435 | Cornwall; Kernow | St Germans; Rural District | |
| | Polperro; Porthpyra | Civil parish | 1,584 | Cornwall; Kernow | Liskeard; Rural District | |
| | Ponsanooth; Pons an Woodh | Civil parish | 1,271 | Cornwall; Kernow | Kerrier; Rural District | |
| | Porthleven; Porthleven | Town | 3,190 | Cornwall; Kernow | Helston; Municipal Borough | |
| | Portreath; Porthtreth | Civil parish | 1,377 | Cornwall; Kernow | Camborne–Redruth; Urban District | |
| | Poundstock; Tregorlann | Civil parish | 805 | Cornwall; Kernow | Stratton; Rural District | |
| | Probus; Lannbroboes | Civil parish | 2,082 | Cornwall; Kernow | Truro; Rural District | |
| | Quethiock; Gwydhek | Civil parish | 429 | Cornwall; Kernow | St Germans; Rural District | |
| | Redruth; Resrudh | Town | 12,352 | Cornwall; Kernow | Camborne–Redruth; Urban District | |
| | Roche; An Garrek | Civil parish | 2,876 | Cornwall; Kernow | St Austell; Rural District | |
| | Ruanlanihorne; Lannihorn | Civil parish | 250 | Cornwall; Kernow | Truro; Rural District | |
| | Saltash; Essa | Town | 14,964 | Cornwall; Kernow | Saltash; Municipal Borough | |
| | Sancreed; Eglossankres | Civil parish | 628 | Cornwall; Kernow | West Penwith; Rural District | |
| | Sennen; Sen Senan | Civil parish | 829 | Cornwall; Kernow | West Penwith; Rural District | |
| | Sheviock; Seviek | Civil parish | 683 | Cornwall; Kernow | St Germans; Rural District | |
| | Sithney; Sen Sydhni | Civil parish | 767 | Cornwall; Kernow | Kerrier; Rural District | |
| | South Hill; Bre Dheghow | Civil parish | 474 | Cornwall; Kernow | Liskeard; Rural District | |
| | South Petherwin; Paderwynn; Dheghow | Civil parish | 932 | Cornwall; Kernow | Launceston; Rural District | |
| | St Agnes; Breanek | Civil parish | 7,257 | Cornwall; Kernow | Truro; Rural District | |
| | St Agnes; Ragynys | Civil parish | 73 | Isles of Scilly; Enesek Syllan | Isles of Scilly; Rural District | |
| | St Allen; Eglosallen | Civil parish | 435 | Cornwall; Kernow | Truro; Rural District | |
| | St Anthony-in-Meneage; Lannentenin | Civil parish | 171 | Cornwall; Kernow | Kerrier; Rural District | |
| | St Austell; Sen Ostell | Town | 18,378 | Cornwall; Kernow | St Austell with Fowey; Municipal Borough | |
| | St Austell Bay | Civil parish | 857 | Cornwall; Kernow | St Austell with Fowey; Municipal Borough | |
| | St Blaise; Lanndreth | Town | 6,632 | Cornwall; Kernow | St Austell with Fowey; Municipal Borough | |
| | St Breock; Nanssans | Civil parish | 703 | Cornwall; Kernow | Wadebridge and Padstow; Rural District | |
| | St Breward; Sen Branwalader | Civil parish | 880 | Cornwall; Kernow | Camelford; Rural District | |
| | St Buryan, Lamorna and Paul | Civil parish | 1,449 | Cornwall; Kernow | West Penwith; Rural District | |
| | St Cleer; Sen Kler | Civil parish | 3,257 | Cornwall; Kernow | Liskeard; Rural District | |
| | St Clement; Sen Klemens | Civil parish | 1,089 | Cornwall; Kernow | Truro; Rural District | |
| | St Clether; Sen Kleder | Civil parish | 149 | Cornwall; Kernow | Camelford; Rural District | |
| | St Columb Major; Sen Kolomm Veur | Town | 3,984 | Cornwall; Kernow | St Austell; Rural District | |
| | St Day; Sen Day | Civil parish | 1,621 | Cornwall; Kernow | Camborne–Redruth; Urban District | |
| | St Dennis; Tredhinas | Civil parish | 2,696 | Cornwall; Kernow | St Austell; Rural District | |
| | St Dominick; Sen Domynek | Civil parish | 833 | Cornwall; Kernow | St Germans; Rural District | |
| | St Endellion; Sen Endelyn | Civil parish | 1,143 | Cornwall; Kernow | Wadebridge and Padstow; Rural District | |
| | St Enoder; Eglosenoder | Civil parish | 3,819 | Cornwall; Kernow | St Austell; Rural District | |
| | St Erme; Egloserm | Civil parish | 1,215 | Cornwall; Kernow | Truro; Rural District | |
| | St Erth; Lannudhno | Civil parish | 1,384 | Cornwall; Kernow | West Penwith; Rural District | |
| | St Ervan; Sen Erven | Civil parish | 408 | Cornwall; Kernow | Wadebridge and Padstow; Rural District | |
| | St Eval | Civil parish | 963 | Cornwall; Kernow | Wadebridge and Padstow; Rural District | |
| | St Ewe; Lannewa | Civil parish | 507 | Cornwall; Kernow | St Austell; Rural District | |
| | St Gennys; Sen Gwynnys | Civil parish | 810 | Cornwall; Kernow | Stratton; Rural District | |
| | St Germans; Lannales | Civil parish | 1,427 | Cornwall; Kernow | St Germans; Rural District | |
| | St Goran | Civil parish | 1,271 | Cornwall; Kernow | St Austell; Rural District | |
| | St Hilary; Bronnlowena | Civil parish | 785 | Cornwall; Kernow | West Penwith; Rural District | |
| | St Issey; Egloskrug | Civil parish | 881 | Cornwall; Kernow | Wadebridge and Padstow; Rural District | |
| | St Ive and Pensilva; Sen Iv ha Pennsilva | Civil parish | 2,121 | Cornwall; Kernow | Liskeard; Rural District | |
| | St Ives; Porth Ia | Town | 11,165 | Cornwall; Kernow | St Ives; Municipal Borough | |
| | St John; Sen Yowann | Civil parish | 375 | Cornwall; Kernow | St Germans; Rural District | |
| | St Juliot | Civil parish | 317 | Cornwall; Kernow | Camelford; Rural District | |
| | St Just; Lannyust | Town | 4,690 | Cornwall; Kernow | St Just; Urban District | |
| | St Just in Roseland; Lannsiek | Civil parish | 1,197 | Cornwall; Kernow | Truro; Rural District | |
| | St Keverne; Lannaghevran | Civil parish | 2,107 | Cornwall; Kernow | Kerrier; Rural District | |
| | St Kew; Lanndogho | Civil parish | 1,026 | Cornwall; Kernow | Wadebridge and Padstow; Rural District | |
| | St Keyne and Trewidland; Sen Keyn ha Trewydhlann | Civil parish | 486 (St Keyne boundaries) | Cornwall; Kernow | Liskeard; Rural District | |
| | St Levan; Sen Selevan | Civil parish | 487 | Cornwall; Kernow | West Penwith; Rural District | |
| | St Mabyn; Sen Mabon | Civil parish | 560 | Cornwall; Kernow | Wadebridge and Padstow; Rural District | |
| | St Martin-by-Looe; Penndrumm | Civil parish | 321 | Cornwall; Kernow | Liskeard; Rural District | |
| | St Martin-in-Meneage; Sen Martyn yn Menaghek | Civil parish | 343 | Cornwall; Kernow | Kerrier; Rural District | |
| | St Martin's; Brechiek | Civil parish | 142 | Isles of Scilly; Enesek Syllan | Isles of Scilly; Rural District | |
| | St Mary's; Ennor | Civil parish | 1,666 | Isles of Scilly; Enesek Syllan | Isles of Scilly; Rural District | |
| | St Mellion; Sen Melyan | Civil parish | 377 | Cornwall; Kernow | St Germans; Rural District | |
| | St Merryn | Civil parish | 1,608 | Cornwall; Kernow | Wadebridge and Padstow; Rural District | |
| | St Mewan; Sen Mewen | Civil parish | 3,071 | Cornwall; Kernow | St Austell; Rural District | |
| | St Michael Caerhays; Lannvighal | Civil parish | 80 | Cornwall; Kernow | St Austell; Rural District | |
| | St Michael Penkevil; Pennkevyll | Civil parish | 213 | Cornwall; Kernow | Truro; Rural District | |
| | St Michael's Mount; Karrek Loos y'n Koos | Civil parish | 29 | Cornwall; Kernow | West Penwith; Rural District | |
| | St Minver Highlands | Civil parish | 1,025 | Cornwall; Kernow | Wadebridge and Padstow; Rural District | |
| | St Minver Lowlands | Civil parish | 1,449 | Cornwall; Kernow | Wadebridge and Padstow; Rural District | |
| | St Neot | Civil parish | 867 | Cornwall; Kernow | Liskeard; Rural District | |
| | St Newlyn East; Eglosniwlin | Civil parish | 1,532 | Cornwall; Kernow | Truro; Rural District | |
| | St Pinnock; Sen Pynnek | Civil parish | 621 | Cornwall; Kernow | Liskeard; Rural District | |
| | St Sampson | Civil parish | 223 | Cornwall; Kernow | St Austell; Rural District | |
| | St Stephen-in-Brannel; Eglosstefan | Civil parish | 6,775 | Cornwall; Kernow | St Austell; Rural District | |
| | St Stephens by Launceston Rural; Lannstefan Wartha | Civil parish | 312 | Cornwall; Kernow | Launceston; Rural District | |
| | St Teath; Eglostedha | Civil parish | 2,343 (including Delabole) | Cornwall; Kernow | Camelford; Rural District | |
| | St Thomas the Apostle Rural; Sen Tommos Lannstefan | Civil parish | 815 | Cornwall; Kernow | Launceston; Rural District | |
| | St Tudy; Eglostudi | Civil parish | 637 | Cornwall; Kernow | Wadebridge and Padstow; Rural District | |
| | St Veep; Sen Vip | Civil parish | 299 | Cornwall; Kernow | Liskeard; Rural District | |
| | St Wenn; Sen Gwenna | Civil parish | 335 | Cornwall; Kernow | St Austell; Rural District | |
| | St Winnow; Sen Gwynnow | Civil parish | 304 | Cornwall; Kernow | Liskeard; Rural District | |
| | Stithians; Sen Stedhyans | Civil parish | 2,004 | Cornwall; Kernow | Kerrier; Rural District | |
| | Stokeclimsland; Eglosklym | Civil parish | 1,670 | Cornwall; Kernow | Launceston; Rural District | |
| | Tintagel; Dintagell | Civil parish | 1,822 | Cornwall; Kernow | Camelford; Rural District | |
| | Torpoint; Penntorr | Town | 8,457 | Cornwall; Kernow | Torpoint; Urban District | |
| | Towednack; Tewynnek | Civil parish | 370 | Cornwall; Kernow | West Penwith; Rural District | |
| | Tregony with Cuby | Civil parish | 955 | Cornwall; Kernow | Truro; Rural District | |
| | Tremaine | Civil parish | 87 | Cornwall; Kernow | Launceston; Rural District | |
| | Tresco; Ynys Skaw | Civil parish | 180 | Isles of Scilly; Enesek Syllan | Isles of Scilly; Rural District | |
| | Tresmeer; Trewasmeur | Civil parish | 216 | Cornwall; Kernow | Launceston; Rural District | |
| | Trevalga; Trevelgi | Civil parish | 83 | Cornwall; Kernow | Camelford; Rural District | |
| | Treverbyn | Civil parish | 6,159 | Cornwall; Kernow | St Austell with Fowey; Municipal Borough | |
| | Trewen; Trewynn | Civil parish | 124 | Cornwall; Kernow | Launceston; Rural District | |
| | Truro; Truru | City | 17,431 | Cornwall; Kernow | Truro; Municipal Borough | |
| | Tywardreath and Par; Chi war Dreth ha Porth | Civil parish | 3,161 | Cornwall; Kernow | St Austell with Fowey; Municipal Borough | |
| | Veryan; Elerghi | Civil parish | 982 | Cornwall; Kernow | Truro; Rural District | |
| | Wadebridge; Ponsrys | Town | 6,351 | Cornwall; Kernow | Wadebridge and Padstow; Rural District | |
| | Warbstow; Lannwarburgh | Civil parish | 439 | Cornwall; Kernow | Launceston; Rural District | |
| | Warleggan; Gorlegan | Civil parish | 203 | Cornwall; Kernow | Liskeard; Rural District | |
| | Week St Mary; Gwig Sen Maria | Civil parish | 550 | Cornwall; Kernow | Stratton; Rural District | |
| | Wendron; Egloswendron | Civil parish | 2,476 | Cornwall; Kernow | Kerrier; Rural District | |
| | Werrington; Trewolvrin | Civil parish | 453 | Cornwall; Kernow | Launceston; Rural District | |
| | Whitstone; Mengwynn | Civil parish | 582 | Cornwall; Kernow | Stratton; Rural District | |
| | Withiel; Gwydhyel | Civil parish | 351 | Cornwall; Kernow | Wadebridge and Padstow; Rural District | |
| | Wolf Rock | Unparished area | 0 | Cornwall; Kernow | West Penwith; Rural District | |
| | Zennor; Sen Senar | Civil parish | 217 | Cornwall; Kernow | West Penwith; Rural District | |

== See also ==
- List of civil parishes in England
- List of places in Cornwall

== Notes ==
^{A} From 1974 to 2009, mainland Cornwall was divided into districts: Caradon (Cornish: Karadon), formed from Liskeard Municipal Borough, Liskeard Rural District, Looe Urban District, Saltash Municipal Borough, St Germans Rural District and Torpoint Urban District; Carrick (Cornish: Karrek), formed from Falmouth Municipal Borough, Penryn Municipal Borough, Truro Municipal Borough and Truro Rural District; Kerrier (Cornish: Keryer), formed from Camborne–Redruth Urban District, Helston Municipal Borough and Kerrier Rural District; North Cornwall (Cornish: Kernow Gledh), formed from Bodmin Municipal Borough, Bude–Stratton Urban District, Camelford Rural District, Launceston Municipal Borough, Launceston Rural District, Stratton Rural District and Wadebridge and Padstow Rural District; Penwith (Cornish: Pennwydh), formed from Penzance Municipal Borough, St Ives Municipal Borough, St Just Urban District and West Penwith Rural District; and Restormel (Cornish: Rostorrmoel), formed from Newquay Urban District, St Austell Rural District and St Austell with Fowey Municipal Borough
