= Caradon =

Former local government district of Cornwall

- Shown within Cornwall
- Population
  - 1973: 58,520
  - 2001: 79,647
- History
  - Preceded by: Borough of Liskeard; Borough of Saltash; Looe Urban District; Torpoint Urban District; Liskeard Rural District; St Germans Rural District
  - Created: 1 April 1974
  - Abolished: 1 April 2009
  - Succeeded by: Cornwall unitary authority
- Status: District
- ONS code: 15UB
- Government: District council
  - HQ: Liskeard
- Subdivisions
  - Type: Civil parishes

Caradon was a local government district in Cornwall, England, United Kingdom. It contained five towns: Callington, Liskeard, Looe, Saltash and Torpoint, and over 80 villages and hamlets within 41 civil parishes. Its district council was based in Liskeard.

The district was formed on 1 April 1974 under the Local Government Act 1972, by the merger of the boroughs of Liskeard and Saltash with the urban districts of Looe and Torpoint, along with Liskeard Rural District and St Germans Rural District.

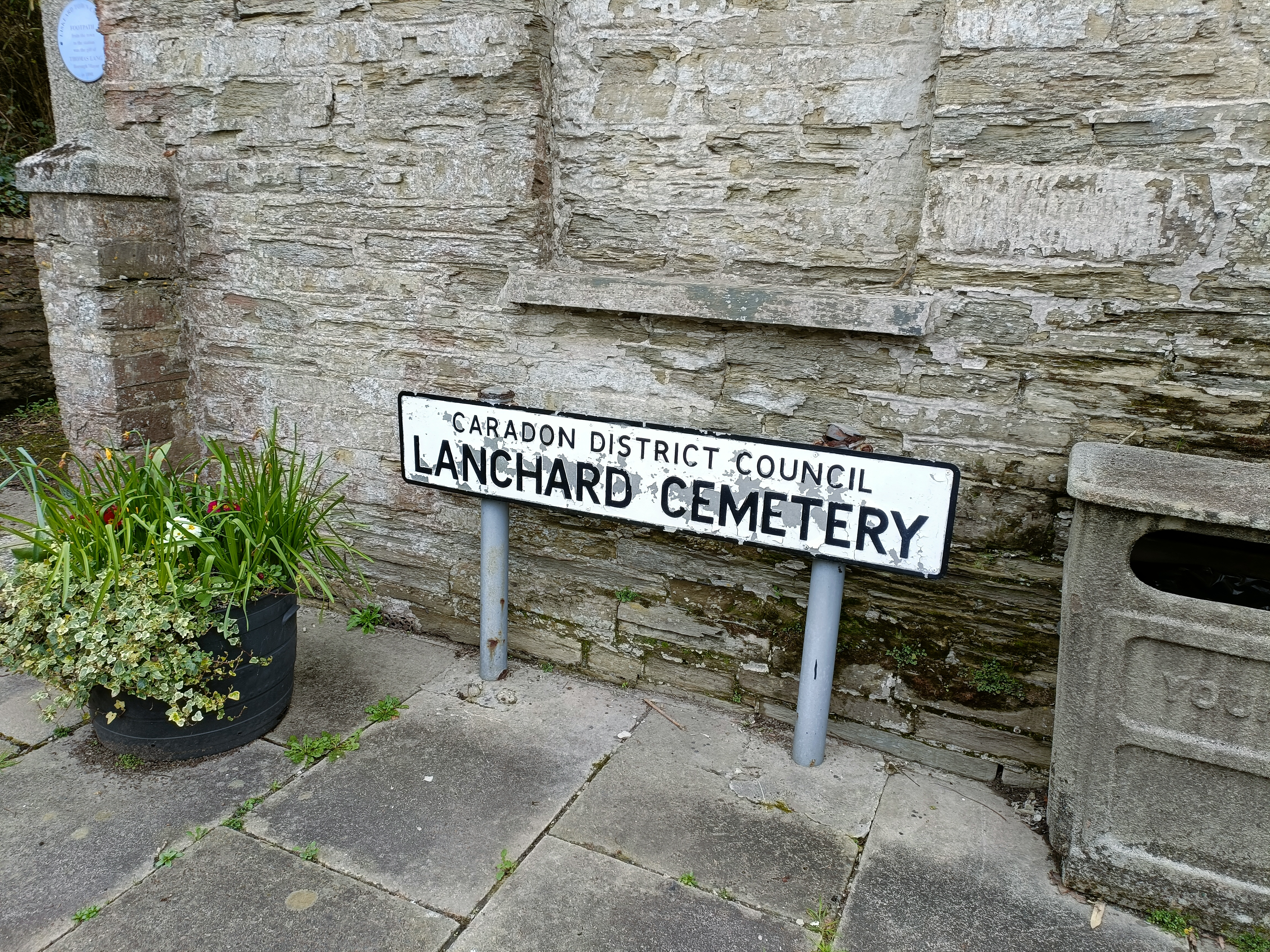
An old sign showing a cemetery in Liskeard, Cornwall as being owned by Caradon District Council.

The district was named after Caradon Hill, the principal landmark of the area, and formerly the site of important copper mines. The district was abolished as part of the 2009 structural changes to local government in England on 1 April 2009.

== Parishes ==
The district contained the parishes of:

- Antony
- Boconnoc, Botusfleming, Broadoak
- Callington, Calstock
- Deviock, Dobwalls and Trewidland, Duloe
- Landrake with St Erney, Landulph, Lanreath, Lanteglos, Linkinhorne, Liskeard, Looe
- Maker-with-Rame, Menheniot, Millbrook, Morval
- Pelynt, Pillaton, Polperro
- Quethiock
- Saltash, Sheviock, South Hill, St Cleer, St Dominick, St Germans, St Ive, St John, St Keyne, St Martin-by-Looe, St Mellion, St Neot, St Pinnock, St Veep, St Winnow
- Torpoint
- Warleggan

== History ==
=== Hundreds of East and West Wivelshire ===
All of Caradon is included in one of these two hundreds. East Wivelshire and West Wivelshire (usually known merely as East and West) are two of the ancient Hundreds of Cornwall. East and West (Wivelshire) must have originally had a Cornish name but it is not recorded (Wivel arises from the misdivision of Twivelshire, i.e. Two-fold shire). There are also Anglican deaneries by the same names but the modern boundaries do not correspond exactly. The area must have formed one hundred originally but had already been divided into two before the Norman Conquest: they are grouped in Domesday under the head manors of Rillaton (East) and Fawton (West). The Cornish names are: East (Ryslegh); West (Fawy).

== See also ==
- Caradon District Council elections
