= Middle Taphouse =

Coordinates: 50.44°N 04.57°W

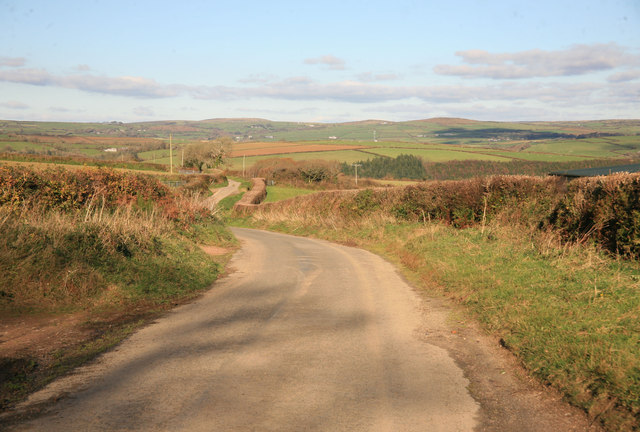
- Lane at Middle Taphouse

- Location within Cornwall
- OS grid reference: SX1763
- Civil parish: St Pinnock; Braddock
- Unitary authority: Cornwall
- Ceremonial county: Cornwall
- Region: South West
- Country: England
- Sovereign state: United Kingdom
- Post town: LISKEARD
- Postcode district: PL14
- Dialling code: 01579
- Police: Devon and Cornwall
- Fire: Cornwall
- Ambulance: South Western
- UK Parliament: South East Cornwall

Middle Taphouse (or Mid Taphouse) is a hamlet in east Cornwall, England, about five miles (8.0 km) west of Liskeard along the A390 road. It consists of a small group of bungalows and houses. Hillball Wood is immediately east of the hamlet, and further woodland lies to the north. The hamlet of West Taphouse is a little further west along the A390 and the small village of East Taphouse is further east. The Western Greyhound 575 bus service between St Neot and Liskeard stops at Middle Taphouse.
