= Liskeard Rural District =

Former local government area in the UK

Coordinates: 50.427°N 4.453°W

Liskeard Rural District was a local government division of Cornwall in England, UK, between 1894 and 1974. Established under the Local Government Act 1894, the rural district was enlarged in 1934 by the abolition of Bodmin Rural District, as well as undergoing a few boundary changes with other adjacent districts.

In 1974 the district was abolished under the Local Government Act 1972, forming part of the new Caradon district.

== Civil parishes ==
The civil parishes within the district were:

- Boconnoc
- Dobwalls and Trewidland
- Duloe
- Lanreath
- Lansallos
- Lanteglos
- Linkinhorne
- Menheniot
- Morval
- Pelynt
- South Hill
- St Cleer
- St Ive
- St Keyne
- St Martin by Looe
- St Neot
- St Pinnock
- St Veep
- St Winnow
- Warleggan
