= Penpoll =

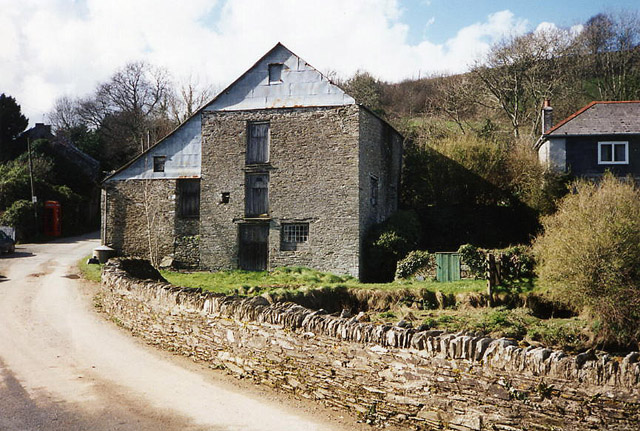
- Coordinates: 50.446°N 4.345°W

Penpoll is a farm in the parish of Quethiock, Cornwall, England, UK. It is near the hamlet of Blunts and north of Tideford Cross. The meaning of Penpoll is "head of a creek".

The manor of Penpoll was recorded in the Domesday Book (1086) when it was held by Reginald from Robert, Count of Mortain. There was 1 acre of land and land for 3 ploughs which were there. There were 4 serfs, 6 villeins, 6 smallholders, 3 acres of meadow, 6 acres of woodland, 30 acres of pasture, 5 cattle, 15 pigs, 60 sheep and 1 cob. The value of the manor was unchanged at £1-10s.
