= North Cornwall =

Area of Cornwall, England

- Shown within Cornwall
- Population
  - 1973: 58,689
  - 2001: 80,529
- History
  - Preceded by: Borough of Bodmin; Borough of Launceston; Bude-Stratton Urban District; Camelford Rural District; Launceston Rural District; Stratton Rural District; Wadebridge and Padstow Rural District
  - Created: 1 April 1974
  - Abolished: 31 March 2009
  - Succeeded by: Cornwall Council unitary authority
- Status: District
- ONS code: 15UE
- Government: District council
  - HQ: Wadebridge
- Subdivisions
  - Type: Civil parishes

North Cornwall (Cornish: An Tiredh Uhel) is an area of Cornwall, England, United Kingdom. It is also the name of a former local government district, which was administered from Bodmin and Wadebridge 50.516°N 4.835°W. Other towns in the area are Launceston, Bude, Padstow, and Camelford. The district was abolished as part of the 2009 structural changes to local government in England on 1 April 2009.

North Cornwall is an area of outstanding natural beauty that is of great geological and scientific interest. It includes the only part of Cornwall that is formed of carboniferous rocks, the northern area of North Cornwall District. The rest of the district lies on Devonian sedimentary strata and the granite of Bodmin Moor. A similar area is covered by the North Cornwall parliamentary constituency.

== Parishes ==
The district contained the parishes of:

- Advent, Altarnun
- Blisland, Bodmin, Boyton, Bude–Stratton
- Camelford, Cardinham
- Davidstow
- Egloshayle, Egloskerry, Forrabury and Minster
- Helland
- Jacobstow
- Kilkhampton
- Laneast, Lanhydrock, Lanivet, Launcells, Launceston, Lawhitton Rural, Lesnewth, Lewannick, Lezant
- Marhamchurch, Michaelstow, Morwenstow
- North Hill, North Petherwin, North Tamerton
- Otterham
- Padstow, Poundstock
- South Petherwin, St Breock, St Breward, St Clether, St Endellion, St Ervan, St Eval, St Gennys, St Issey, St Juliot, St Kew, St Mabyn, St Merryn, St Minver Highlands, St Minver Lowlands, St Stephens by Launceston Rural, St Teath, St Thomas the Apostle Rural, St Tudy, Stoke Climsland
- Tintagel, Tremaine, Treneglos, Tresmeer, Trevalga, Trewen
- Wadebridge, Warbstow, Week St Mary, Werrington, Whitstone, Withiel

== Geography ==
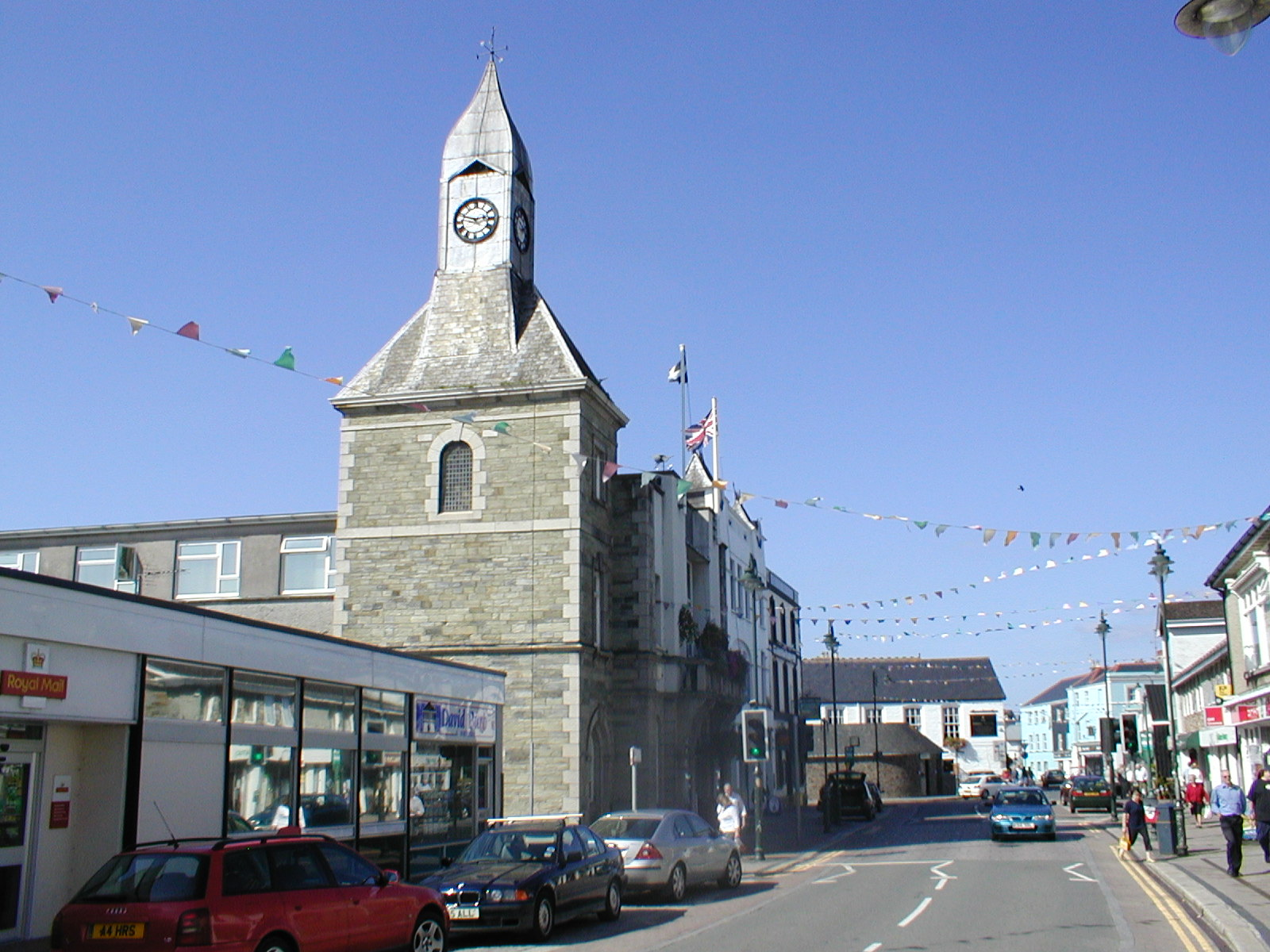
Looking along The Platt towards Wadebridge Town Hall

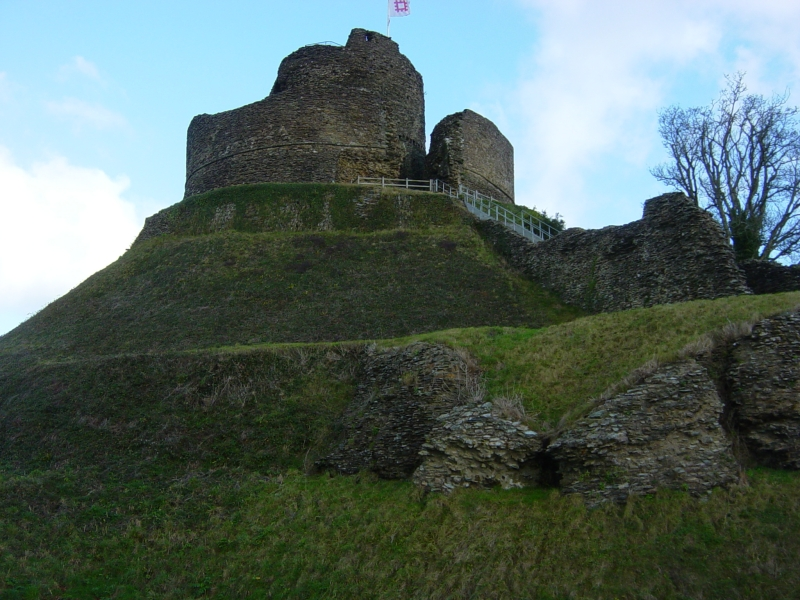
The motte at Launceston Castle

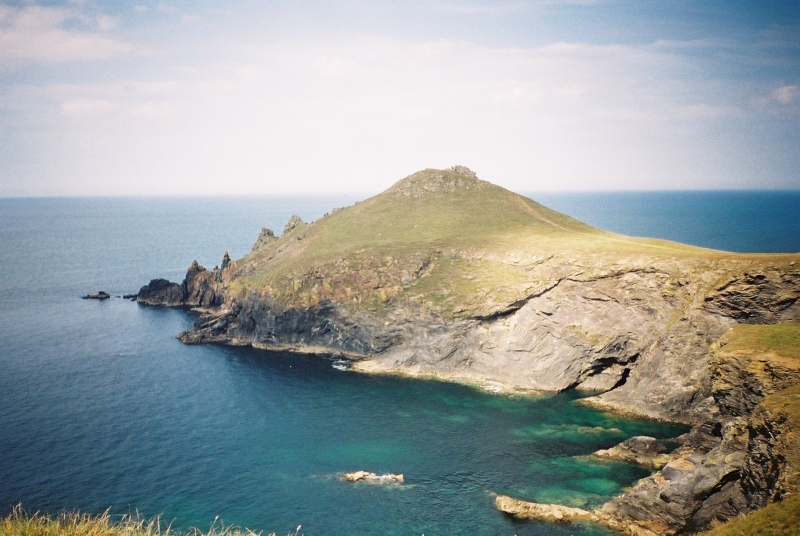
The Rumps, on Pentire Point, North Cornwall, site of Iron Age cliff fortifications

North Cornwall has a stretch of coastline that borders the Celtic Sea to the north. The Carboniferous sandstone cliffs that surround Bude (and stretch down as far south as Crackington Haven) were formed during the Carboniferous period, around 300 million years ago. They are part of what are known to geologists as the Culm Measures which continue eastwards across north Devon. The folded and contorted stratification of shale and sandstone is unique in southern England. During the Variscan Orogeny, which affected the entire Cornish coast, the cliffs were pushed up from underneath the sea, creating the overlapping strata. As the sands and cliffs around Bude contain calcium carbonate (a natural fertiliser), farmers used to take sand from the beach, for spreading on their fields. The cliffs around Bude are the only ones in Cornwall that are made of Carboniferous sandstone, as most of the Cornish coast is geologically formed of Devonian slate, granite and Precambrian metamorphic rocks). The stratified cliffs of Bude gave their name to a geological event called the Bude Formation. Many formations can be viewed from the South West Coast Path which passes through the town.

The larger harbours are at Padstow and Bude and on the intervening coast Port Isaac, Port Gaverne, Port Quin, Port William, Tintagel, Bossiney and Boscastle have all been used either for fishing or the export of slate. There are good beaches at Polzeath, Trebarwith Strand and Bude. At Delabole the large Delabole Quarry has been worked for many centuries and there were once in the parish of Tintagel many other slate quarries. Granite and elvan have also been important minerals: there are major granite quarries in the parish of St Breward and also some china clay works on the edges of Bodmin Moor e.g. at Stannon near Camelford.

Most of the lowland areas have good agricultural land used either for mixed or dairy farming. At Davidstow much of the milk is processed into Davidstow cheese.

== See also ==
- North Cornwall District Council elections
- Bodmin Moor
- Triggshire
