= Marnarck =

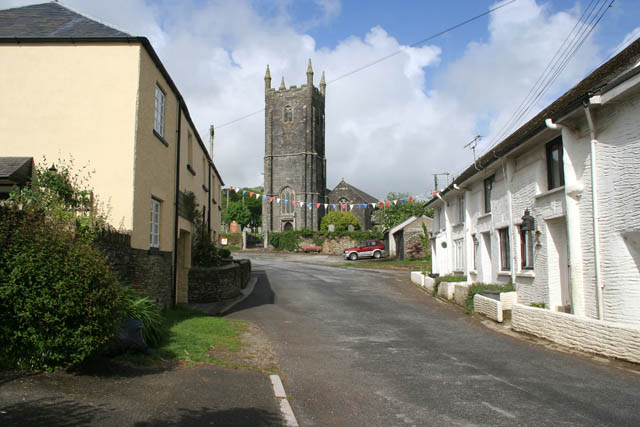
Lanreath village and church

St Marnarck also known as Manaccus was a bishop who became the patron saint of Lanreath. According to William Worcester his body lay in the church of Lanreath. He is commemorated in one of the stained glass windows of St Neot parish church. His feast day is 3 August.

== See also ==
- Mannacus
