= Calstock Rural District =

Local government division of Cornwall, England

Coordinates: 50.501°N 4.208°W

Calstock Rural District was a local government division of Cornwall in England, UK, between 1894 and 1934. Established under the Local Government Act 1894, the rural district was abolished in 1934, enlarging St Germans Rural District.

During its existence the district contained the village and civil parish of Calstock.
