= Launceston Rural District =

Former local government area in the UK

Coordinates: 50.646°N 4.391°W

Launceston Rural District was a local government division of Cornwall between 1894 and 1974. Established under the Local Government Act 1894, the rural district was enlarged in 1966 by the abolition of Broadwoodwidger Rural District, in Devon, to include the civil parishes of North Petherwin and Werrington.

In 1974 the district was abolished under the Local Government Act 1972, forming part of the new North Cornwall district.

== Civil parishes ==
The civil parishes within the district were:

- Altarnun
- Boyton
- Broadoak
- Egloskerry
- Laneast
- Lawhitton Rural
- Lewannick
- Lezant
- North Hill
- North Petherwin
- South Petherwin
- St Stephens by Launceston Rural
- St Thomas the Apostle Rural
- Stokeclimsland
- Tremaine
- Treneglos
- Tresmeer
- Trewen
- Warbstow
- Werrington
