= Treverbyn Vean =

- Location within Cornwall
- 50.4582°N 4.559°W
- Type: House
- Location: St Neot, Cornwall

History
- Built: 1858-1862

Site notes
- Architect(s): William Burges, George Gilbert Scott
- Architectural style: Gothic Revival
- Governing body: Privately owned

Listed Building – Grade II*
- Official name: Treverbyn Vean
- Designated: 5 November 1987
- Reference no.: 1140489

Treverbyn Vean is a 19th-century mansion in St Neot, Cornwall. Its exterior was designed by George Gilbert Scott and its interior by William Burges, two of the major architects of the Gothic Revival. The house is a Grade II* listed building.

== History and architecture ==
Commissioned by Colonel Charles Cocks, the house was constructed between 1858 and 1862. The house has an exterior designed by George Gilbert Scott and an interior by William Burges. It is a Grade II* listed building as at 5 November 1987. Externally, the house forms an "irregular range in Tudor Gothic Revival style." Internally, "the house retains more of its original interior than any other by Burges, apart from those for Lord Bute at Cardiff Castle and Castle Coch and Sir John Heathcote Amory at Knightshayes in Devon". In his interiors Burges attempted to "...conjure up, in Victorian terms, the artistic spirit of a medieval house. Many contemporaries regarded these attempts as the pinnacle of Burges's success". Treverbyn Vean is listed "for the importance of these surviving interior features as well as its fine exterior composition by Scott". Burges's contribution to the house is overlooked in the 2013 revised edition of the Cornwall Pevsner.

== Sources ==
- Crook, J. Mordaunt (2013). William Burges and the High Victorian Dream. London, UK: Frances Lincoln. ISBN 978-0-7112-3349-2.
- Beacham, Peter; Pevsner, Nikolaus (2013). Cornwall. The Buildings of England. New Haven, CT and London: Yale University Press. ISBN 978-0-300-12668-6.
