= East Taphouse =

Village in Cornwall, England

Coordinates: 50.441°N 4.565°W

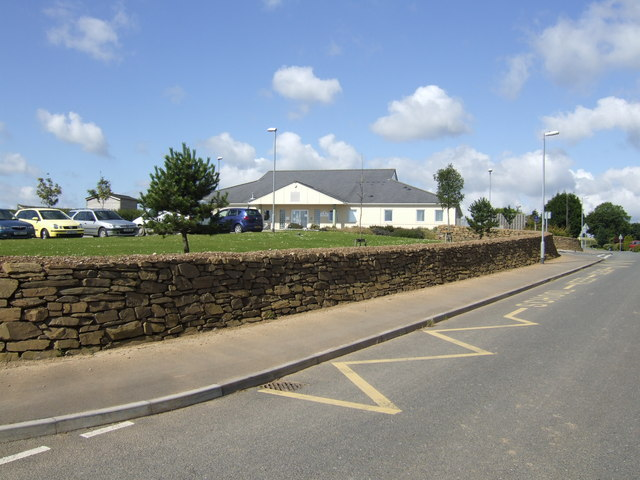
Braddock Primary School, East Taphouse

East Taphouse (Cornish: Diwotti Est) is a village in Cornwall, England, in the civil parish of St Pinnock, one mile (1.6 km) west of Doublebois on the A390 Liskeard to St Austell road. A little further west are the hamlets of Middle Taphouse and West Taphouse.
