= Blunts, Cornwall =

Hamlet in Cornwall, England

Coordinates: 50.4431°N 4.3351°W

Blunts: Cornish: Shoppa Blunt
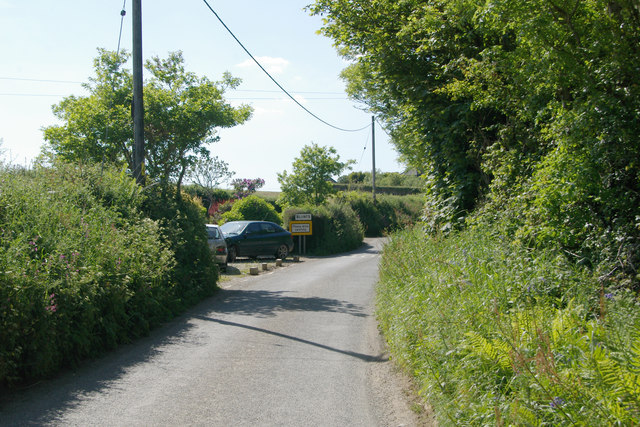

- Location within Cornwall
- OS grid reference: SX343630
- Civil parish: Quethiock
- Unitary authority: Cornwall
- Ceremonial county: Cornwall
- Region: South West
- Country: England
- Sovereign state: United Kingdom
- Post town: SALTASH
- Postcode district: PL12
- Dialling code: 01752
- Police: Devon and Cornwall
- Fire: Cornwall
- Ambulance: South Western
- UK Parliament: South East Cornwall

Blunts (Cornish: Shoppa Blunt, meaning Workshop of the Blunt family) is a hamlet southeast of Quethiock in the civil parish of Quethiock in east Cornwall, United Kingdom. It is situated west of the River Lynher valley about 5 miles (8 km) north-west of Saltash on the road from Quethiock village to Landrake. The meaning of Blunts is "Blunt family's workshop". The hamlet has a Methodist chapel (formerly Bible Christian), a garage, and a women's institute.
