= Camelford Rural District =

Former government division of Cornwall, England

Coordinates: 50.6190°N 4.6812°W

Camelford Rural District was a local government division of north Cornwall between 1894 and 1974. The district council offices were at Camelford, Cornwall, England, UK, latterly in the former grammar school. It was one of several rural districts in Cornwall which carried out some local government functions while those for Cornwall as a whole were the responsibility of the Cornwall County Council.

== Parishes ==
The following civil parishes were within the district:

- Camelford (Lanteglos by Camelford; Advent)
- Davidstow
- Forrabury and Minster (Forrabury; Minster)
- Lesnewth
- Michaelstow
- Otterham
- St Breward
- St Clether
- St Juliot
- St Teath (St Teath; Delabole)
- Tintagel
- Trevalga

== Sources ==
- Camelford Rural District in Vision of Britain (based on F. Youngs, Local Administrative Units: Southern England. London: Royal Historical Society; p. 63)
