= Pillaton =

Coordinates: 50.456°N 4.303°W

Pillaton: Cornish: Trebeulyow
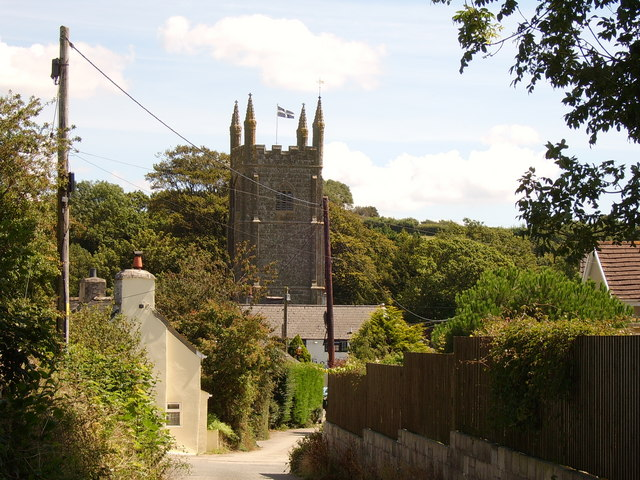
- St Odulph's Church

- Location within Cornwall
- Population: 473 (2011)
- OS grid reference: SX3664
- Civil parish: Pillaton
- Unitary authority: Cornwall
- Ceremonial county: Cornwall
- Region: South West
- Country: England
- Sovereign state: United Kingdom
- Post town: SALTASH
- Postcode district: PL12
- Dialling code: 01579
- Police: Devon and Cornwall
- Fire: Cornwall
- Ambulance: South Western
- UK Parliament: South East Cornwall

Pillaton (Cornish: Trebeulyow) is a village and civil parish in south east Cornwall, England, United Kingdom.

The parish extends to approximately 4.6 square miles, (1,177 hectares). It is bounded by the parishes of St Mellion and St Dominic to the north, the River Lynher to the west, Botus Fleming to the south and Landulph to the east. The population is 435 of which 366 are on the electoral register. About 70 per cent of the people live in the village itself. Land use in the parish is dominated by farming, although less than 10 per cent of resident workers are employed in this industry. The population had increased to 473 at the time of the 2011 census. There was a further increase to 499 by the time of the 2021 census, with 78 identifying as Cornish nationals.

The majority of residents work outside the parish, and Pillaton is effectively a dormitory village for people employed in Plymouth and South East Cornwall. The Pentillie estate lies in the east of the parish, on the banks of the River Tamar.

== History ==
Pillaton was recorded in Domesday Book (1086) when the manor was held by Reginald from Robert, Count of Mortain. There was half a hide of land and land for 6 ploughs. There were 3 ploughs, 3 serfs, 7 villeins and 7 smallholders. There were 100 acres of pasture, 40 acres of woodland, 30 sheep, 10 goats and 2 cattle. The value of the manor was £1 though it had formerly been worth £1-10s.

== Notable buildings ==
The parish church, St Odulph's, is a Grade I listed building and stands at the upper end of the village alongside The Weary Friar, a public house with accommodation, and across the road from the village hall. The church has a west tower and a south aisle. The wagon roofs are old and there is a fine monument of 1772 to James Tillie. On the night of 21 January 2013, the church was badly damaged during a snowstorm, when a thunderbolt struck the tower and heavy pieces of masonry from one of the pinnacles crashed through the tiled roof and fell into the church below. Extensive repairs were carried out with the support of English Heritage, and the church was able to reopen in November 2013, in time for the annual Remembrance Day service.

== Viverdon Quarry ==
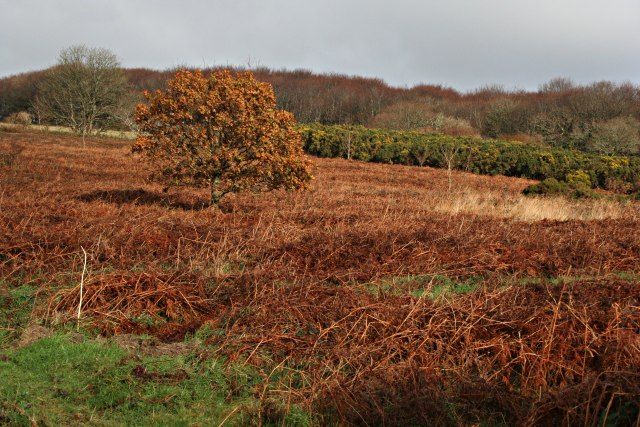
Viverdon Down

Viverdon Quarry is a Site of Special Scientific Interest on Viverdon Down and is a Geological Conservation Review site. The citations states:

This locality is a rare inland exposure which is fossiliferous and has yielded a Dinantian (anchoralis Zone) conodont fauna. Recent work has also recorded ostracods and bivalves referable to a Famennian age. This site is of great importance in interpreting the local stratigraphy as it reveals previously unknown structural features including the Upper Devonian thrust over the Carboniferous.

The field surrounding it is the subject of a planning application for a solar farm.
