= West Taphouse =

Coordinates: 50°26′29.35″N 4°36′5.24″W

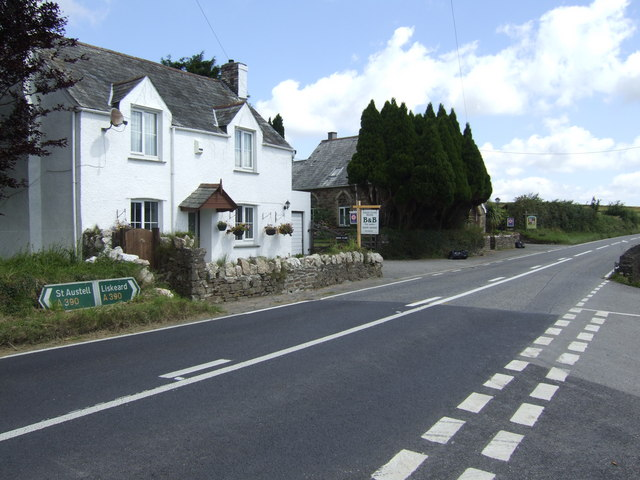
Close Cross House

West Taphouse is a hamlet in Cornwall, England. It is on the A390 road west of Middle Taphouse and East Taphouse.
