= Wadebridge and Padstow Rural District =

Former local government area in the UK

Coordinates: 50.515°N 4.899°W

Wadebridge and Padstow Rural District was a local government division of Cornwall in England, UK, between 1968 and 1974. The rural district was created in 1968 through the abolition of Padstow Urban District and Wadebridge Rural District.

In 1974 the district was abolished under the Local Government Act 1972, forming part of the new North Cornwall district.

== Civil parishes ==
The civil parishes within the district were:

- Blisland
- Cardinham
- Egloshayle
- Helland
- Lanhydrock
- Lanivet
- Padstow
- St Breock
- St Endellion
- St Ervan
- St Eval
- St Issey
- St Kew
- St Mabyn
- St Merryn
- St Minver Highlands
- St Minver Lowlands
- St Tudy
- Wadebridge
- Withiel
