= Stratton Rural District =

Former local government area in the UK

Coordinates: 50.863°N 4.509°W

Stratton Rural District was a local government division of Cornwall in England, UK, between 1894 and 1974. Established under the Local Government Act 1894, the rural district underwent boundary changes in both 1934 and 1966 with adjacent districts.

In 1974, the district was abolished under the Local Government Act 1972, forming part of the new North Cornwall district.

== Civil parishes ==
The civil parishes within the district were:

- Jacobstow
- Kilkhampton
- Launcells
- Marhamchurch
- Morwenstow
- North Tamerton
- Poundstock
- St Gennys
- Week St Mary
- Whitstone
