= St Pinnock =

Hamlet in Cornwall, England

Coordinates: 50.442°N 4.534°W

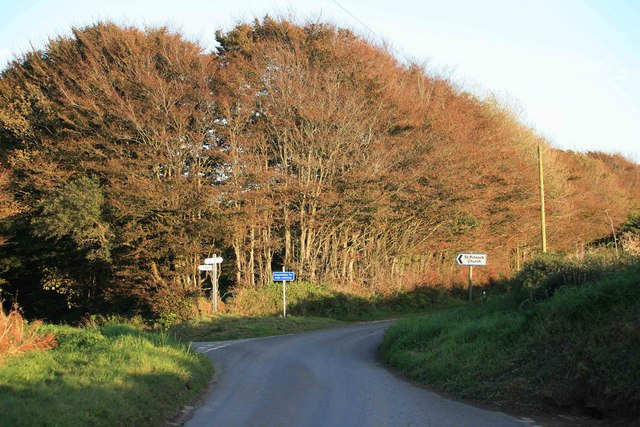
- Road junction for St Pinnock

- Location within Cornwall
- Population: 676 United Kingdom Census 2011 including Connonu
- Civil parish: St Pinnock
- Shire county: Cornwall
- Region: South West
- Country: England
- Sovereign state: United Kingdom
- Post town: Liskeard
- Postcode district: PL14
- Police: Devon and Cornwall
- Fire: Cornwall
- Ambulance: South Western

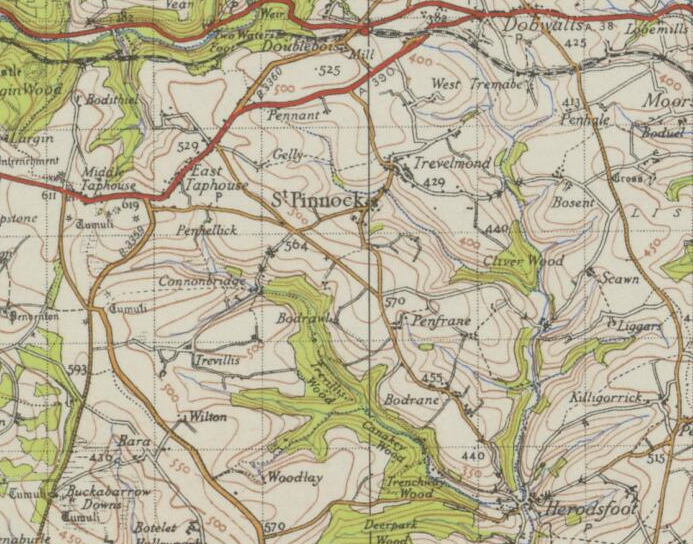
Historical map of St Pinnock

St Pinnock (Cornish: Sen Pynnek) is a hamlet and civil parish in southeast Cornwall, England, United Kingdom, 3 miles (5 km) south-west of Liskeard. Other settlements in the parish include East Taphouse, and Penfrane, containing 421 inhabitants. The parish church, dedicated to St Pynnochus (Winnoc), is located at OS Grid Ref SX200630.

To the north, the parish is bordered by St Cleer and St Neot parishes, to the east by Dobwalls and Trewidland parish, to the south by Lanreath and Duloe parishes and to the west by Braddock parish. In 1851 the parish of Herodsfoot was created from parts of St Pinnock, Lanreath and Duloe parishes. The parish of St Pinnock has always been in the Liskeard Registration District. The A390 road runs through the north of the parish.

In the 1870s, St Pinnock was described as:

PINNOCK (St.), a parish in Cornwall; adjacent to the Cornwall railway, 3¼ miles; and 1¼ S of Doublebois r. station. Post-town. Acres, 3, 487. Real property, £2, 464; of which £350 are in mines. Pop., 571. Houses, 104. The property is subdivided. The living is a rectory in the diocese of Exeter. Value, £285.* Patrons, A. Coryton, Esq., the Rev. E. J. Treffry, and the Rev. J. Rawlings. The church is very ancient, and has a tower. There are chapels for Bible Christians and Calvinistic Methodists, and a free school.

== Population structure of St Pinnock ==
The parish population at the 2001 census was 621; at the 2011 census it had increased to 673. According to the 2011 Census there were 315 males and 361 females living in the parish. The following graph shows the changes between 1880 and 2001, the graph shows that there was a gradual decrease in the population of St Pinnock between 1850 and 1950, however, after 1950 there was a steep increase in the population of St Pinnock.

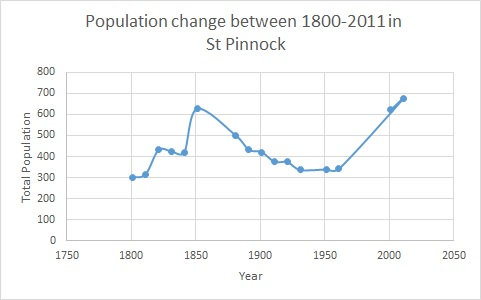
Total Population of St Pinnock between 1800 and 2011

=== 1881 occupational structure ===
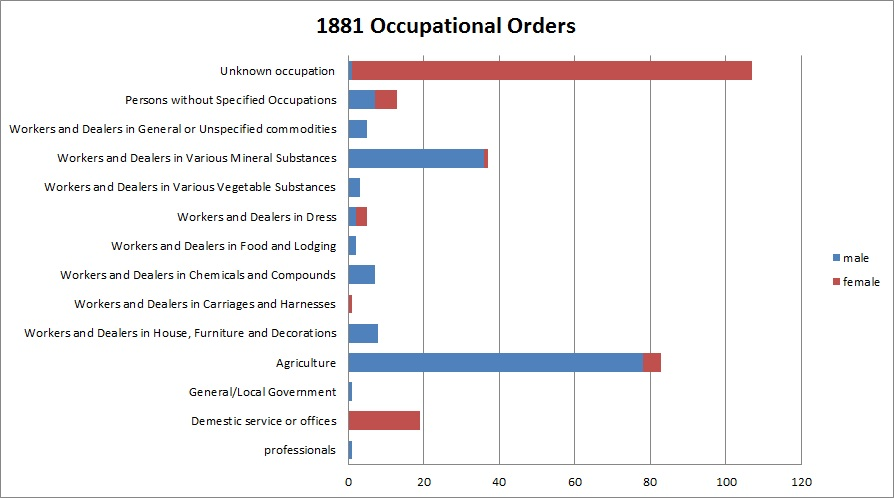
1881 Occupational Structure

The 1881 occupational structure of St Pinnock, according to statistics gathered from Vision of Britain, shows that agriculture was the largest occupation taken up by men, followed by work in mineral substances (there was a lead and silver mine called Herod's Foot). The majority of women in 1881 worked in domestic services or offices.

== Poor law union ==
On 1 February 1837 the Liskeard Union for Poor Law and administration and parish relief was formed which included the parish of St Pinnock.

== Churches and schools ==
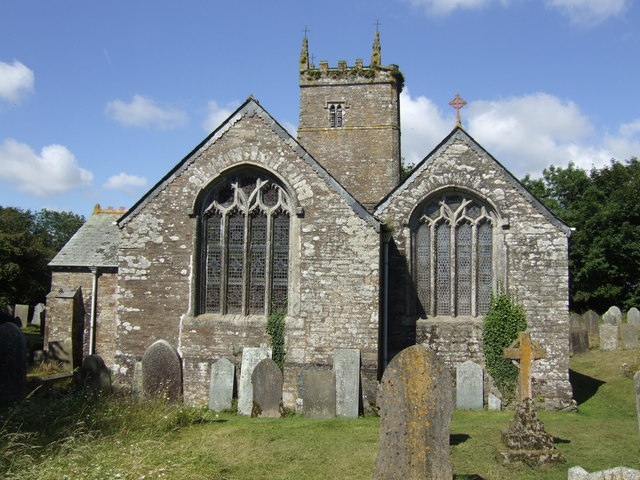
St Pinnock Church

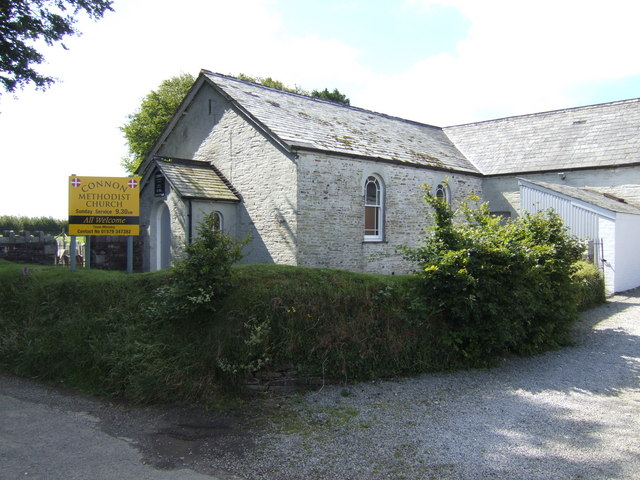
Connon Methodist Church

The Church of England parish church of St Pynnochus (Winnoc), is a Grade I listed building but closed for worship in 2017. The parish church lies on the edge of the hamlet of St Pinnock, where there are two Methodist chapels: Connon Chapel and Trevelmond Chapel, located within the parish. The parish has a Church of England Primary School and a Community Hall, both at East Taphouse.

The medieval church building was cruciform but the present structure is mainly of the 14th century; it was over-restored in Victorian times. The rectory was attached to the manor of Penvrane before 1226. The church was reopened on 18 April 1882 following a rebuild of the south chapel which serves as a vestry. The nave roof was restored and seats of pitchpine installed in the nave and aisle. A chapel of All Saints is mentioned in 1437. Bosent Cross is a fine 14th-century cross; the cross in the rectory garden came from Towednack.

The church was described on the Heritage at Risk Register as a:

Small parish church. Norman cruciform origins with C15 north aisle and nave rebuilds, the tower of C14, C16 south porch. Coursed rubble with granite dressings. Cornish slated roofs with some slates slipped. Damp tower with much vegetation growth and problem downpipe on the north side.

The parish church has closed and, in 2019, is available for sale. It has been on the Heritage at Risk Register.

== St Pinnock Viaduct ==
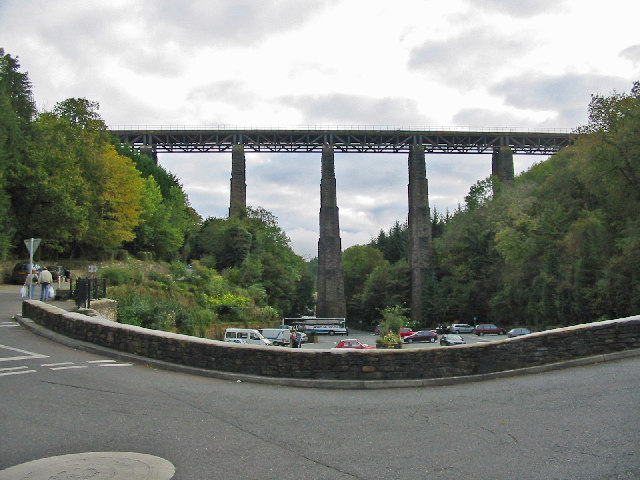
St Pinnock Viaduct

The railway line through the parish was constructed by the Cornwall Railway company.. The line runs between Plymouth and Truro. The railway opened in 1859 and was extended to Falmouth in 1863.

The St Pinnock railway Viaduct, was built in 1854-5 by Isambard Kingdom Brunel and heightened in 1882. It consists of seven piers of roughly dressed, coursed slatestone from Westwood quarry. It stands at approximately 60 foot with each pier consisting of eight buttresses with weatherings rising to form five stages with pointed openings piercing the 4 upper stages. Batter of about 1 in 100. In 1882 the piers were heightened with a slightly cruder, tapering, sixth stage and iron girders were used to replace Brunel's timber trestles. The two-track railroad of 1882 and later carried on rivetted plate steel girders with steel guardrails and refuges to the north side. It is considered the tallest viaduct on the railway in Cornwall, at 633 feet in length and 151 feet in height.

The line was singled over the viaduct on 24 May 1964 to reduce the load on the structure. Beneath the viaduct is the Trago Mills out-of-town shopping complex.
