= Pentillie =

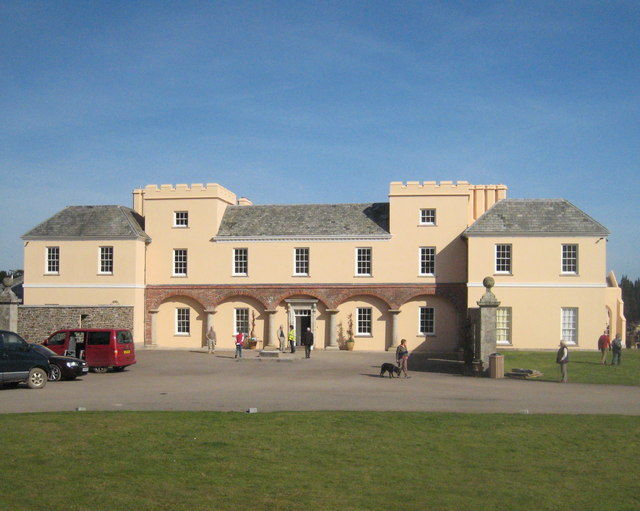

General information
- Type: English country house
- Location: St Mellion, Cornwall, England, England
- Coordinates: 50.4592°N 4.2415°W
- Inaugurated: 1698
- Owner: Sammie Coryton

Website
- http://www.pentillie.co.uk

Listed Building – Grade II*
- Official name: Pentillie Castle
- Designated: 21 July 1951
- Reference no.: 1140189

Pentillie Castle is a grade II* listed country house and estate on the bank of the River Tamar in Paynters Cross, near to St Mellion, in Cornwall, England, in the United Kingdom. The secular parts of the nearby village of St Dominick once belonged to the estate.

== History ==
From a poor background, Sir James Tillie (16 November 1645 – 15 November 1713) rose through the ranks, and became an agent for Sir John Coryton (son of William Coryton), owner of the estate, Newton Ferrers. Soon after the sudden death of Sir John, Tillie improved his fortunes by wedding his patron's widow, Elizabeth. Tillie then divided the Newton Ferrers estate, and commissioned the building of Pentillie, which was completed in 1698. James Tillie died in 1713, leaving the Pentillie estate to his nephew, James Woolley. On his death the estate was passed to Woolley's daughter Mary Jemima, who went on to marry Peter Coryton, the new heir of Newton Ferrers, thereby reuniting the two estates. Pentillie then became the main seat of the Coryton family in Cornwall.

The Corytons were a prosperous 18th-century family, becoming owners of more than 20,000 acres (81 km^{2}) of land in Cornwall. In 1809, the family appointed the landscape designer Humphry Repton to draw up plans for a remodelling of Pentillie. Repton envisaged a Gothic Revival castle, and as a consequence of his vision, Pentillie was extensively enlarged in 1810, with the construction of three new wings to the west side of the old structure. The building thus enclosed a central open courtyard.

Pentillie remained in the ownership of the Coryton family throughout the 19th and 20th centuries. During the Second World War the south wing of Pentillie Castle was requisitioned and used as maternity ward for the local population. By the 1960s the house was in a poor state of repair, and the decision was taken to demolish most of the 1810 construction. The subsequently remodelled Pentillie Castle was declared a listed building in 1968.

In 2007, Pentillie was inherited by Ted Spencer and his wife Sarah (they have subsequently changed their surname to Coryton). In 2009 and 2011, Pentillie was the subject of a Channel 4 television programme presented by hotelier Ruth Watson as part of her Country House Rescue series. Pentillie Castle has also featured as a film location on a number of occasions, notably as 'Pentillie House' in the German adaptation of Rosamunde Pilcher's Im Zweifel für die Liebe (2009) and as the Penrose Hotel in Sky 1's hotel drama Delicious.

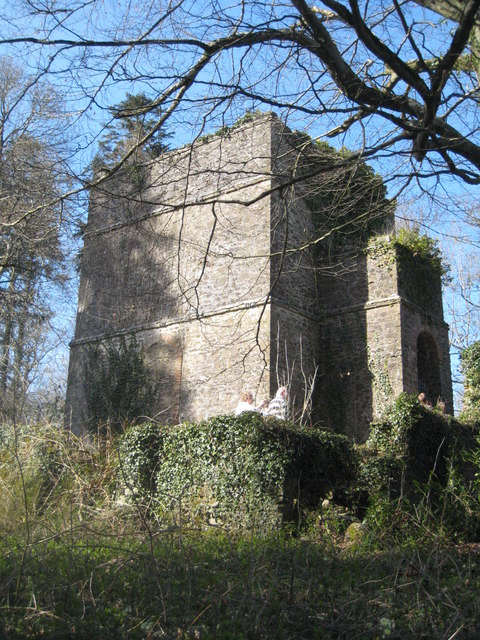
Pentillie Mausoleum

In 2013, archaeologists discovered human remains at the Grade II* listed mausoleum at Pentillie, despite suggestions in the 19th century that all bodies had been removed from the site. It is speculated that the remains are of the original owner of Pentillie, James Tillie. In his will, Tillie had instructed that he should not be buried, but dressed in his best clothes, bound to a stout chair and placed with his books, wine and pipe in the vault of the mausoleum. Investigations as to whether these are the remains of James Tillie continue.

== Pentillie today ==
Today, Pentillie Castle is available for hire for weddings, civil partnerships, corporate events and private parties. Accommodation at the castle is also available. In addition, the estate's gardens are being restored and are open to the public on specific open days, they regularly host Afternoon Teas and outdoor theatre productions in the summer.

== Notable people ==
Air Chief Marshal Sir William Alec Coryton KCB, KBE, MVO, DFC, RAF was born at Pentillie.
