= St Mellion =

Village in Cornwall, England

Coordinates: 50.467°N 4.272°W

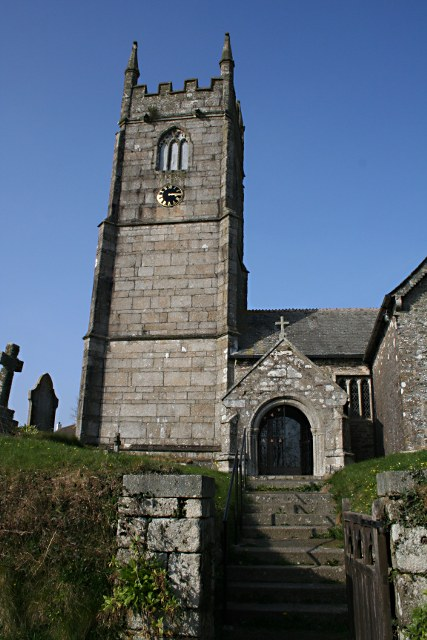
- St Melanus' church tower

- Location within Cornwall
- Population: 383 (2011 Census)
- OS grid reference: SX3865
- Civil parish: St Mellion
- Unitary authority: Cornwall
- Ceremonial county: Cornwall
- Region: South West
- Country: England
- Sovereign state: United Kingdom
- Post town: Saltash
- Postcode district: PL12
- Dialling code: 01579
- Police: Devon and Cornwall
- Fire: Cornwall
- Ambulance: South Western
- UK Parliament: South East Cornwall
- Website: St Mellion Parish Council

St Mellion (Cornish: Sen Melyan) is a village and rural civil parish in east Cornwall, England, United Kingdom. The parish is about 3 miles (5 km) south of Callington and is in the St Germans Registration District. To the north, the parish is bordered by Callington and St Dominick parishes, to the east and south by Pillaton parish, and to the west by St Ive parish.

The population in the 2001 Census was 377. The 2011 Census recorded that this had increased to 383.

The parish name is taken from St Melaine, a 6th-century bishop of Rennes, Brittany.

== Parish church ==
The Church of England parish church of St Melanus is in the village of St Mellion (the largest settlement in the parish) at OS Grid Ref SX388655. The older part of the church is the south side which was built in the 14th century whereas the north side is of the late 15th century and was built of granite. There is a series of monuments to the Corytons: these include a brass to Peter Coryton and his wife and 24 children, 1552, and two elaborate sculptural compositions to William Coryton (1580–1651), and Sir William, {1650–1711) both in a style characteristic of the early 17th century.

== Notable sites ==
St Mellion is also the location of Pentillie, a 17th-century castle and estate which has been a seat of the Coryton family since 1698. They additionally owned an estate at Newton Ferrers, also in St Mellion. The manor of Newton Ferrers (Niuuetona, Niweton, Niwetone) is recorded in the Domesday Book of 1086. It was held by Reginald from Robert, Count of Mortain. The house on the New Ferrers estate, Newton Ferrers House, was built about 1686–95 for Sir William Coryton. Gatepiers carry these dates. It is a plain granite mansion of two storeys: the centre is of seven bays and there are two projecting wings of two bays each. It is the earliest Cornish mansion in the classical style (i.e. with no Tudor survivals). Two thirds of the house were gutted by fire in 1940; of this some was subsequently rebuilt after the fire while the rest remained as ruin. In the 21st century the house was completely restored.

Crocadon Quarry, 200 metres east of St Mellion village, is a Site of Special Scientific Interest for its geology. The St Mellion golf course is also in the parish.

== Sources ==
- Dunkin, E (1882). Monumental Brasses. London: Spottiswoode.
- Pevsner, Nikolaus; Radcliffe, Enid (revision) (1970) [1951]. Cornwall. The Buildings of England. Harmondsworth: Penguin Books. pp. 127, 190. ISBN 0-14-071001-9.
- Beacham, Peter; Pevsner, Nikolaus (2014). Cornwall. The Buildings of England. New Haven, US and London: Yale University Press. ISBN 978-0-300-12668-6.
- Thorn, Caroline; Thorn, Frank, eds. (1979). Cornwall. Domesday Book. Vol. 10. Chichester: Phillimore. ISBN 0850331552.
