= Lanreath =

Civil parish in Cornwall, England

Coordinates: 50.384°N 4.560°W

Lanreath: Cornish: Lannreydhow
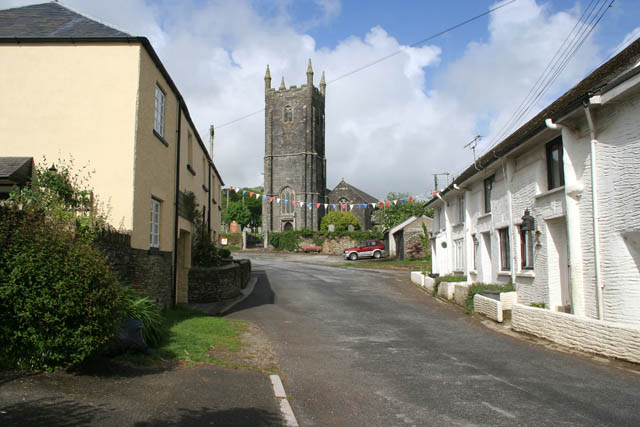
- Lanreath village and church

- Location within Cornwall
- Population: 610 (United Kingdom Census 2021)
- OS grid reference: SX181569
- Civil parish: Lanreath
- Unitary authority: Cornwall
- Ceremonial county: Cornwall
- Region: South West
- Country: England
- Sovereign state: United Kingdom
- Post town: LOOE
- Postcode district: PL13
- Dialling code: 01503
- Police: Devon and Cornwall
- Fire: Cornwall
- Ambulance: South Western
- UK Parliament: South East Cornwall

Lanreath (Cornish: Lannreydhow) is a civil parish and a village in southeast Cornwall, England, United Kingdom. The village is situated five miles (8 km) west-northwest of Looe. The name Lanreath (pronounced Lanreth) means 'church (Lann) of Raydhogh' and it has been known variously as Lanreythow, Lanrathew, or Lanrethou. The village is mentioned in the Domesday Book as Lanredoch.

Lanreath parish is entirely rural in character; apart from scattered farmsteads, the only settlement is Lanreath village. The parish is bordered to the west by Boconnoc and St Veep parishes, to the south by Pelynt parish, to the east by Duloe parish, and to the north by St Pinnock parish.

== History ==
At the time of the Domesday Book (1086) Lanreath was one of 28 manors held by Richard (son of Turolf) from Robert, Count of Mortain. There was one hide of land and land for 8 ploughs. There were 3 ploughs, 4 serfs, 4 villeins and 10 smallholders. There were 30 acres of pasture, 40 acres of woodland, 3 cattle and 60 sheep. The value of the manor was 25 shillings.

Ida Pollock, a romance novelist and centenarian, died at Lanreath.

== Parish church ==
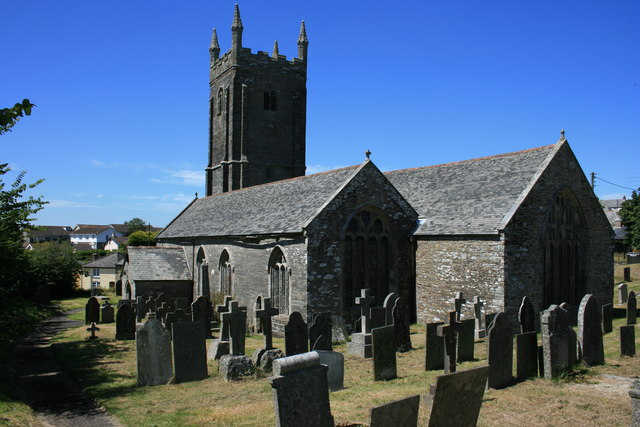
St Marnarck's church

The church is dedicated to St Marnarck (although it was originally dedicated to St Sancredus). Part of the walls are probably Norman but the church is otherwise of the 15th century; according to Pevsner "wholly Perp. and especially complete and satisfying". It was well restored in 1887 by G. F. Bodley. The font is Norman, of the Fowey type, ornate and of Catacleuze stone. The rood crosses both nave and aisle and is substantially original, though restored in 1905. There is more interesting woodwork dating from the 16th and 17th centuries. The monument to Charles Grylls and wife, of 1623, is ornate and unusual, being carved in wood.

== Other buildings and institutions ==
Near the church is the manor house of the Grylls family, ca. 1610, but much restored in 1899.

=== School ===
The former Lanreath primary school closed in 2007 with a roll of only 11 pupils. A BBC documentary, Power to the People, was broadcast about the plight of rural villages and the closure of Lanreath CE Primary School.
