= Landrake with St Erney =

Civil parish in Cornwall, England

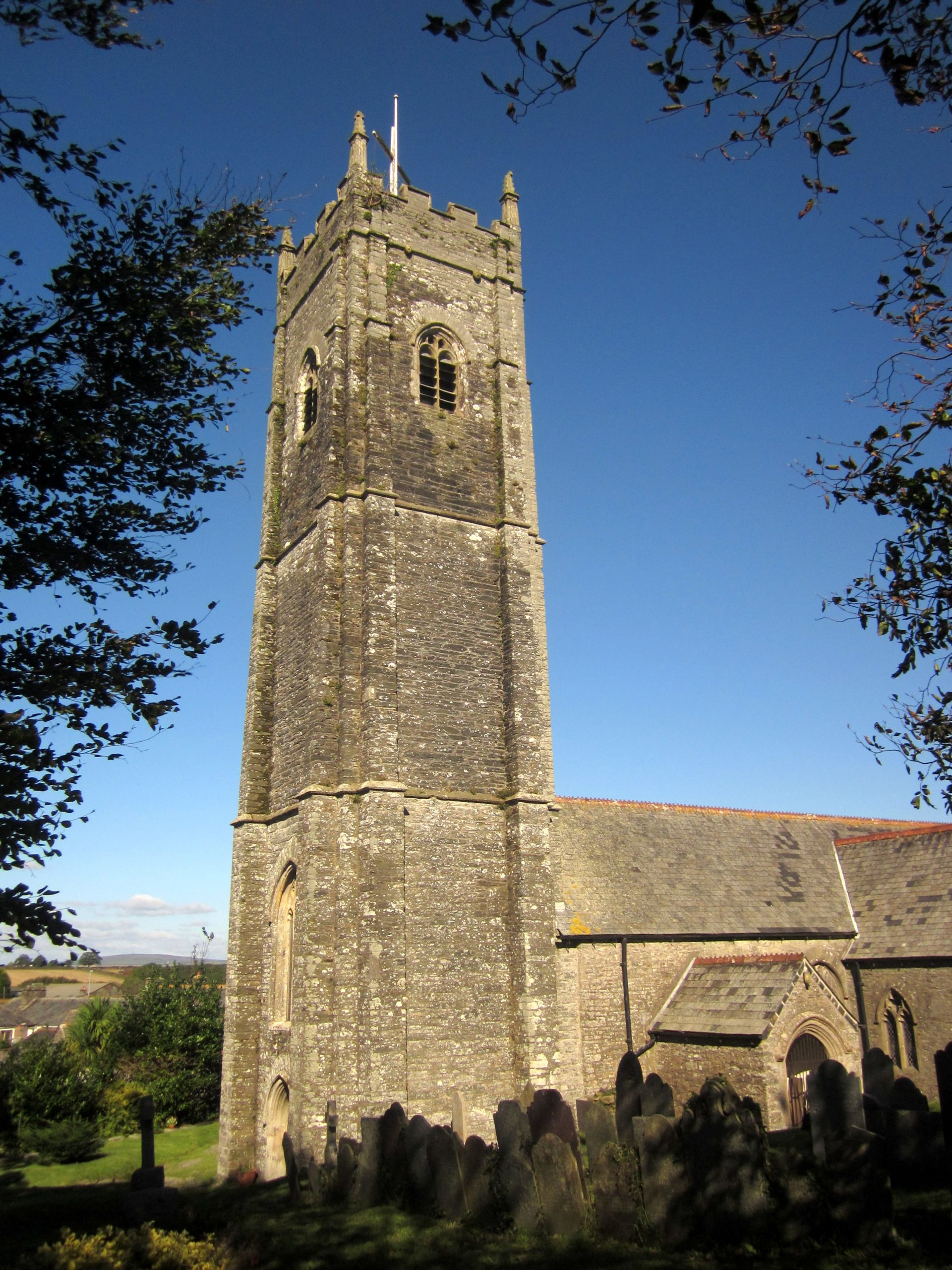
Landrake Church

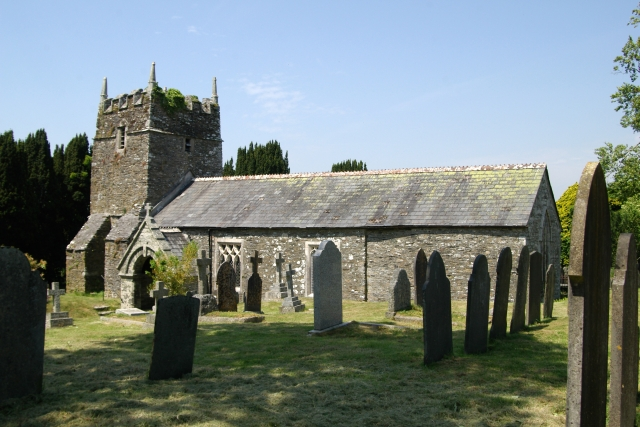
St Erney Church

Landrake with St Erney (Cornish: Lannergh a'byth Sen Erney) is a civil parish in Cornwall, England. The parish population at the 2011 census was 1,115.

St Erney parish church is dedicated to St Terninus. St Terninus, Terney, or Erney, is also the patron saint of the parish church of North Hill, but nothing is known of him. It has been suggested that he is the same person as St Ternan, who evangelised the Picts in the 5th century. The west tower is built of slate and of two stages. The north aisle was added to the existing church building in the 15th century. The font, which has a square bowl, has been variously dated to the 11th and 13th century.
