= St Clether =

Village in Cornwall, England

Coordinates: 50.630°N 4.535°W

St Clether is a civil parish and village in Cornwall, England, United Kingdom. The village is situated on the east flank of Bodmin Moor approximately eight miles (13 km) west of Launceston in the valley of the River Inny. The population of the civil parish at the 2011 census was 156.

The original Norman church of St Clederus was, apart from the tower, rebuilt in 1865. The tower is built of granite and is of late medieval date; the font is Norman and very plain. The benefice is united with those of Saint Sidwell and Saint Gulval, Laneast, and Saint Nonna, Altarnun.

West of St Clether parish church is a holy well and associated chapel, said to be one of Cornwall's best preserved. The church and holy well are dedicated to Saint Cleder (or Clederus), one of the twenty-four children of Saint Brychan, a Welsh saint and King of Brycheiniog in the 5th century.

Arthur Langdon (1896) records five stone crosses in the parish of which four are at the old manor house of Basill Barton.

== Gallery ==
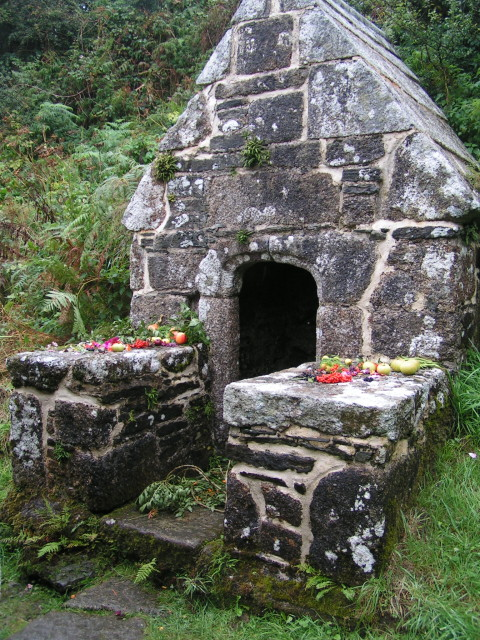
St Clether Holy Well

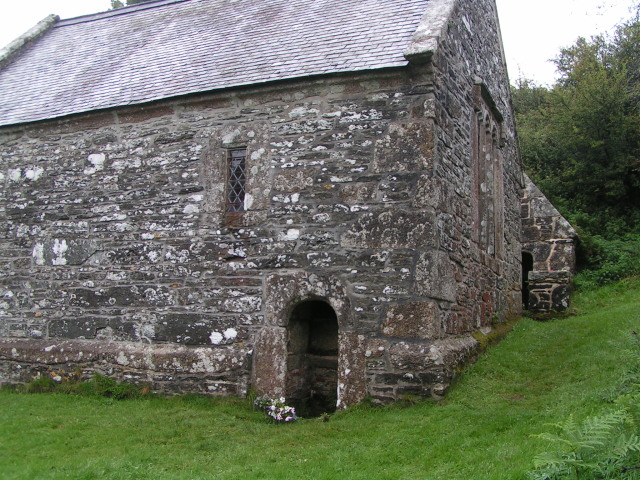
St Clether Chapel and Holy Well

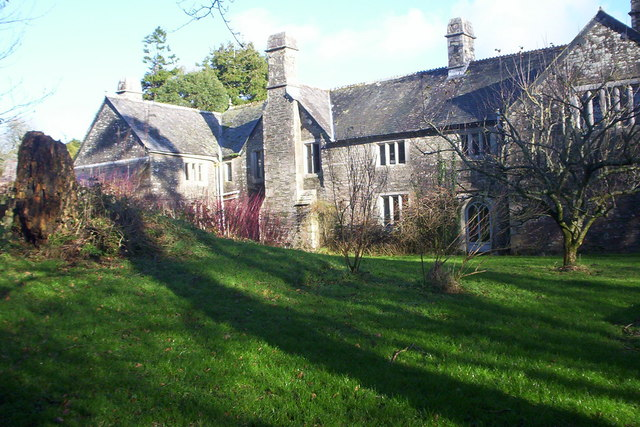
Basill Manor

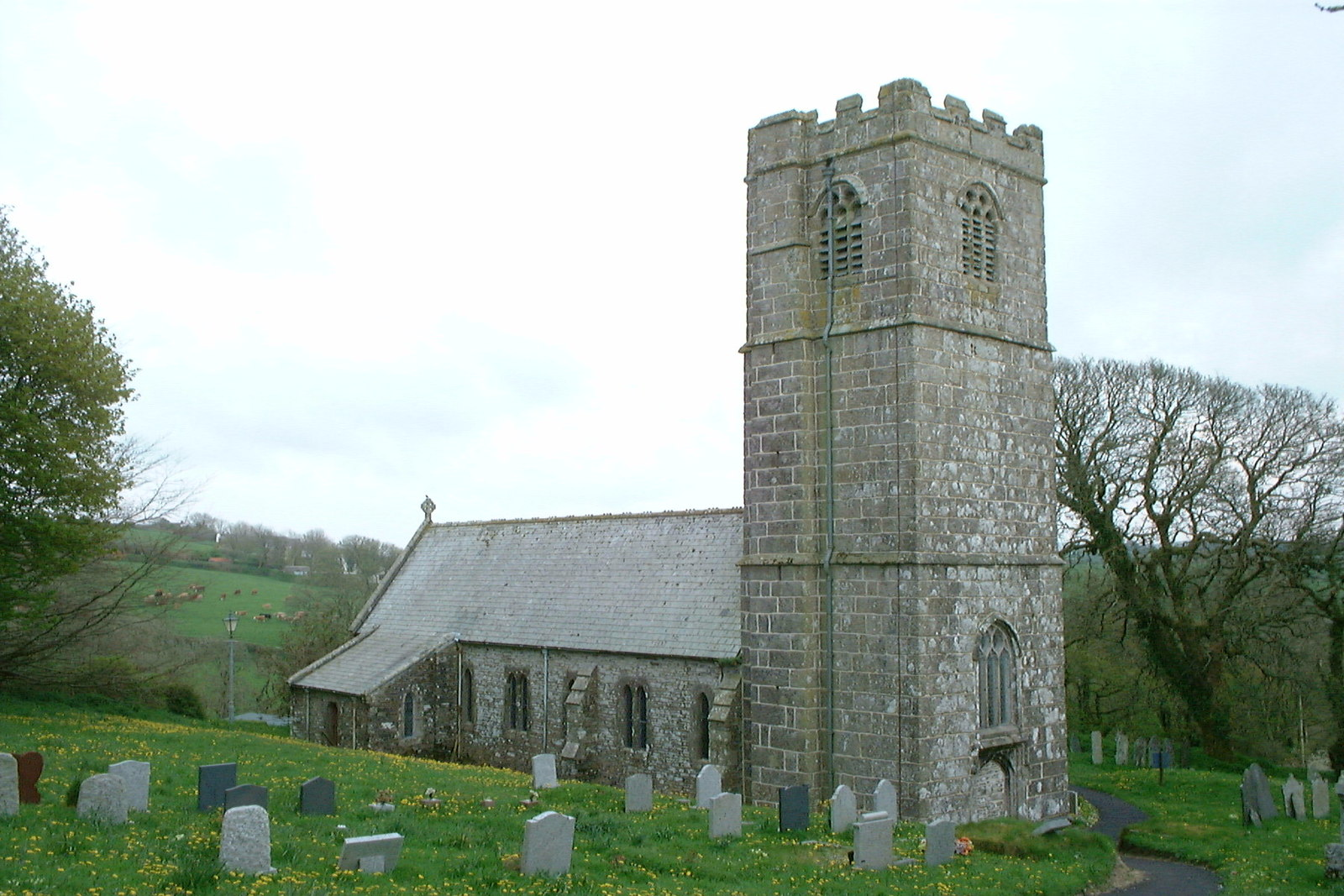
St Clederus church, St Clether
