= Braddock, Cornwall =

Village in Cornwall, England

Coordinates: 50.430°N 4.589°W

Braddock: Cornish: Brodhek
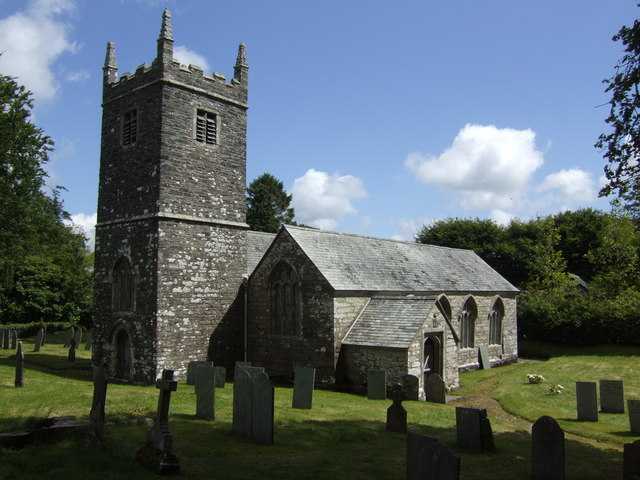
- St. Mary the Virgin

- Location within Cornwall
- Population: 211 (Civil Parish, 2011)
- OS grid reference: SX162620
- Civil parish: Braddock
- Unitary authority: Cornwall
- Ceremonial county: Cornwall
- Region: South West
- Country: England
- Sovereign state: United Kingdom
- Post town: LISKEARD
- Postcode district: PL14
- Dialling code: 01579
- Police: Devon and Cornwall
- Fire: Cornwall
- Ambulance: South Western
- UK Parliament: South East Cornwall

Braddock (Cornish: Brodhek) is a village and civil parish in Cornwall, England, United Kingdom. The village is about seven miles west of Liskeard, and five miles south-east of Bodmin. The parish was called Broadoak until 1 April 2021.

== Geography ==
The parish is rural in character and is well wooded, especially in the north, covering 3,389 acres (1,371 ha) of land and 15 acres (6.1 ha) of water. The hamlets of West Taphouse and Trewindle are in the parish. According to the 2001 census, the parish had a population of 124 increasing to 156 at the 2011 census.

== History ==
Killboy or Penventon Cross is a stone cross standing on the route of a disused path which runs from Penventon Farm to the church. An account of this cross was published in The Gentleman's Magazine in 1805. The original site of the cross is uncertain.

=== Parish church ===
The ecclesiastical parishes of Braddock and Boconnoc have been united since 1742. Braddock church is dedicated to St Mary the Virgin: the earliest parts of the building are Norman but an aisle and a tower were added in the 15th century. The font is Norman and there are many good examples of woodcarving in the church: these include the bench ends, part of the rood screen, wagon roofs, an Elizabethan pulpit and two carved panels perhaps of the 18th century.

Arthur Tatham (1808–1874) was for over forty years rector of Broadoak and Boconnoc, Cornwall, and prebendary of Exeter Cathedral.

=== Battle of Braddock Down ===
The Battle of Braddock Down was a battle of the English Civil War which occurred on 19 January 1643 and was a crushing defeat for the parliamentarian army. Sir Ralph Hopton, 1st Baron Hopton's royalist forces had been camped the night before the battle at nearby Boconnoc and were surprised when, in the morning on breaking camp, their vanguard of dragoons encountered enemy parliamentarian cavalry already deployed on the east side of Braddock Down. General Ruthvin, the parliamentarian commander, had been unwilling to wait for the Earl of Stamford's reinforcements to arrive at Liskeard and, perhaps wishing to claim the expected defeat of Hopton as his own, had marched out to challenge the royalist army.

Braddock Down was in terms of scale a battle, but in terms of action was in some senses little more than a skirmish. The defeat of the parliamentarians was achieved with apparently little effort to the Royalists but at great cost to the enemy. Cornwall was placed back under Royalist control and Hopton's reputation was secured.

There is some dispute over the exact location of the battlefield. The traditional site is partly within the parkland of Boconnoc, partly under pasture. Although the Down was open common grazing land at the time of the battle, the land to the west around Braddock church appears already to have been enclosed by 1643. There one can see examples of the typical Cornish hedges, stone faced banks surmounted by hedges, that bounded such enclosures in the 17th century. Today, access to the site is difficult because there are no public footpaths and the roads that traverse the battlefield are narrow with high hedges.
