= Botusfleming =

Village in Cornwall, England

Coordinates: 50.430°N 4.248°W

Botus Fleming: Cornish: Bosflumyes
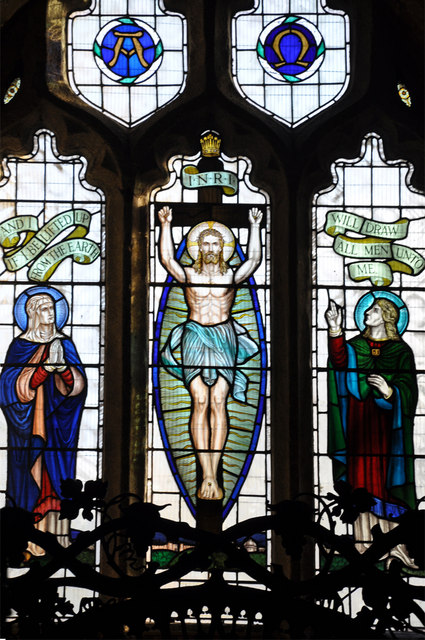
- Pictorial main three-panes of east window of St Mary's church in well-illuminated glass

- Location within Cornwall
- Population: 771 (2011)
- OS grid reference: SX 404 614
- Civil parish: Botus Fleming
- Unitary authority: Cornwall
- Ceremonial county: Cornwall
- Region: South West
- Country: England
- Sovereign state: United Kingdom
- Post town: SALTASH
- Postcode district: PL12
- Dialling code: 01752
- Police: Devon and Cornwall
- Fire: Cornwall
- Ambulance: South Western
- UK Parliament: South East Cornwall

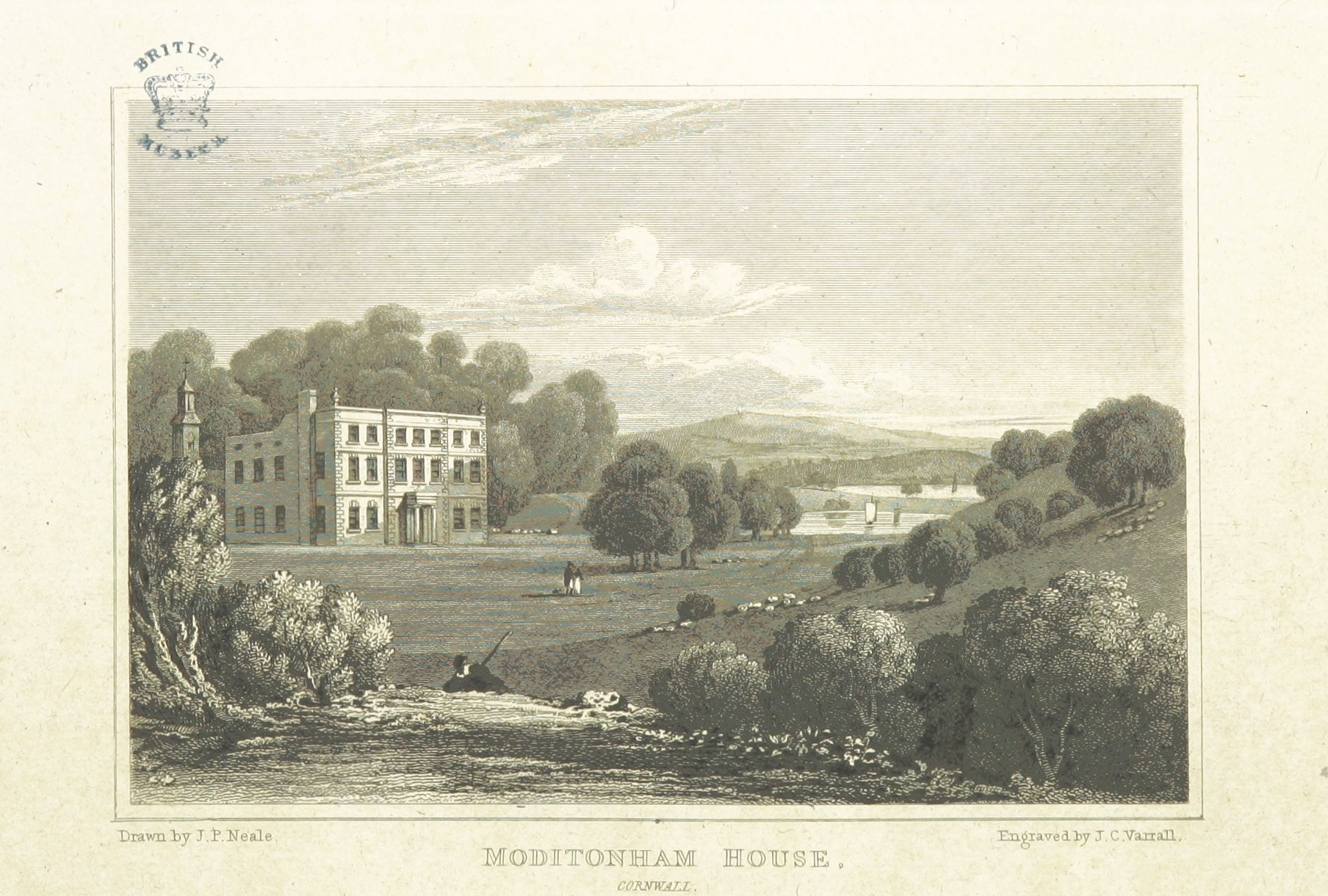
Moditonham House, c. 1818

Botus Fleming or Botusfleming (Cornish: Bosflumyes) is a village and civil parish in southeast Cornwall, England, United Kingdom. The parish population was 766 at the 2021 census. The village is about three miles north-west of Saltash at grid reference SX 403 612. There is a public house (the Rising Sun), a market garden and a small colony of artists, but the village is mostly a dormitory area for Plymouth.

== Parish church ==
The parish church is dedicated to St Mary and has a western tower and a fine arcade between the nave and the north aisle. The church was restored in 1872 by Henry Eliott; this restoration included new roofs, floors, pews and glazing. The font is of Polyphant stone, probably 14th century in date. In a field near the church is an obelisk in memory of William Martyn built in 1762.

In the church is a stone effigy of a knight in armour; he is thought to be Stephen le Fleming who was a medieval Crusader and perhaps left his name to the place.

== Other buildings ==
- Moditonham House is the site of the medieval castle of the Moditons and is now a large Georgian house which is a grade two* listed building incorporating fabric from the earlier building. Michael Loam, a Cornish engineer who introduced the first man engine (a device to carry men up and down the shaft of a mine) into the UK died here.
- The Bidwell is a 20th-century restored 14th century constructed well (with a roof) on a main street in the village, with a 19th-century statue of Saint Mary (mother of Jesus).
- The Rising Sun pub was voted number 5 in Britain's Good Pub Guide 2009.

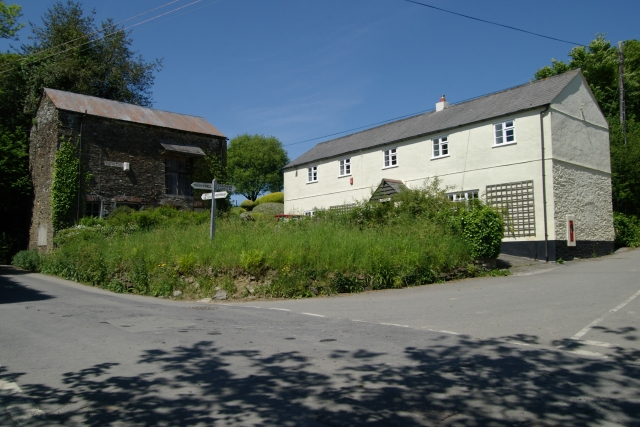
Crossroads at Botusfleming

== Demographics ==
Census population of Botusfleming parish
| Census | Population | Households |
|---|---|---|
| 2001 | 783 | |
| 2011 | 771 | 319 |
| 2021 | 766 | 330 |
