= Quethiock =

Village in Cornwall, England

Coordinates: 50.458°N 4.378°W

Quethiock: Cornish: Koosek
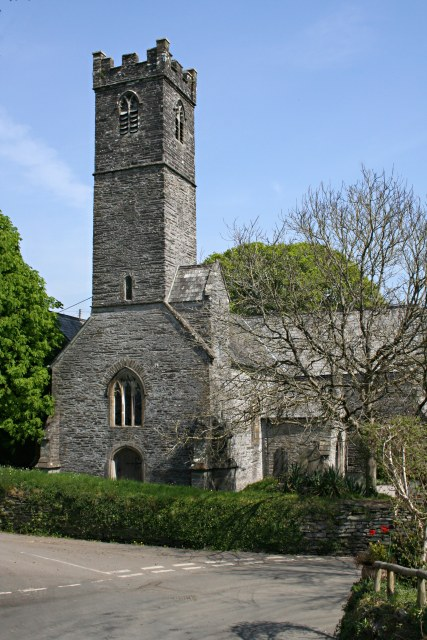
- Parish church of St. Hugh near the centre of the village

- Location within Cornwall
- Population: 493 (2011 census including Cutmere)
- Civil parish: Quethiock
- Unitary authority: Cornwall
- Ceremonial county: Cornwall
- Region: South West
- Country: England
- Sovereign state: United Kingdom
- Post town: Liskeard
- Postcode district: PL14
- Police: Devon and Cornwall
- Fire: Cornwall
- Ambulance: South Western

Quethiock (Cornish: Koosek, meaning "forested place") is a village and civil parish in Cornwall, England, United Kingdom, roughly five miles east of Liskeard. According to the 2001 census the parish had a population of 429, increasing to 443 at the 2011 census. The ancient parish church of St Hugh is one of the most notable in Cornwall. The placename derives from the Old Cornish cuidoc meaning wooded place. In 1871 the population was 661 and the area 4,351 acres (17.61 km^{2}).

Formerly part of the Pentillie Estate and owned by Squire Coryton most of the properties passed into owner occupation after a forced sale to meet Estate Duty in the early 1920s. The village has not had a public house since the closure of the Mason's Arms in the 1920s. There was a post office at Ivydene until the 1960s not long before the closure of the village General Supply Stores which not only sold everything from groceries to petrol and organs but also delivered weekly groceries to farms, mills and cottages throughout a radius of 15 miles (24 km). There was a village shop which closed in the 1980s. The distinctive building that was the Methodist chapel has retained its distinctive exterior but inside has been converted into a private dwelling.

Quethiock's economy is centred principally around nearby Liskeard and Plymouth. The vast majority of the village's population is either retired or in full-time work. There is a local Church of England primary school.

Besides the church and school, three other public services are available in Quethiock: the post box, the phone box and the bus shelter. Internal village matters are communicated by means of the parish noticeboard, located at the centre of the village.

== Parish Church of St Hugh (Church of England) ==
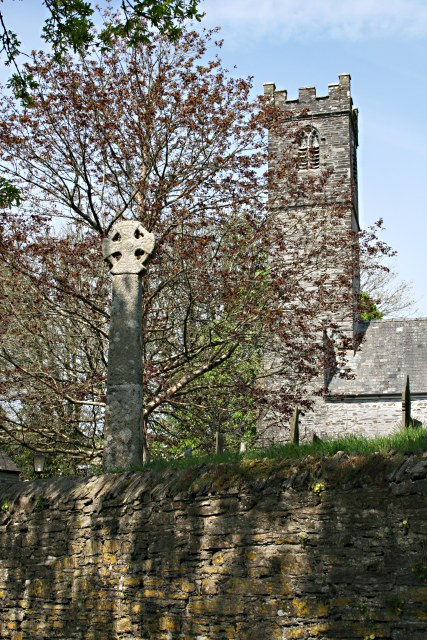
St Hugh's Church with the cross in the churchyard in the foreground

The original church was cruciform in plan but a tower was added (probably in the 13th century) and then the aisle. There are old wagon roofs and a funeral recess (14th century). The stained glass and some other ornamental work is the handiwork of the late 19th century vicar, William Willimott, and there are three brasses (1471 to Roger Kyngdon, and 1631 to Richard Chiverton, d. 1617, and his wife). The church was restored in the 1880s after becoming virtually ruinous in the 1870s. Willimott's predecessor as vicar was the Rev Dr John Rooke Fletcher (d. 1878) who was vicar for 61 years. There were Methodist chapels and almshouses (Directory for 1873).

There is a Cornish cross in the churchyard. An account of its discovery was published in the Journal of the Royal Institution of Cornwall; vol. 7, 1882. Arthur Langdon said of it: "Undoubtedly this is a magnificent monument, and in regard to height is, with the exception of the cross in Mylor churchyard, since discovered, the tallest in Cornwall".

The vicar of Quethiock is the Revd Margot Davies.
