= St Neot, Cornwall =

Village in Cornwall, England

Coordinates: 50.482°N 4.559°W

St Neot: Cornish: Logniet
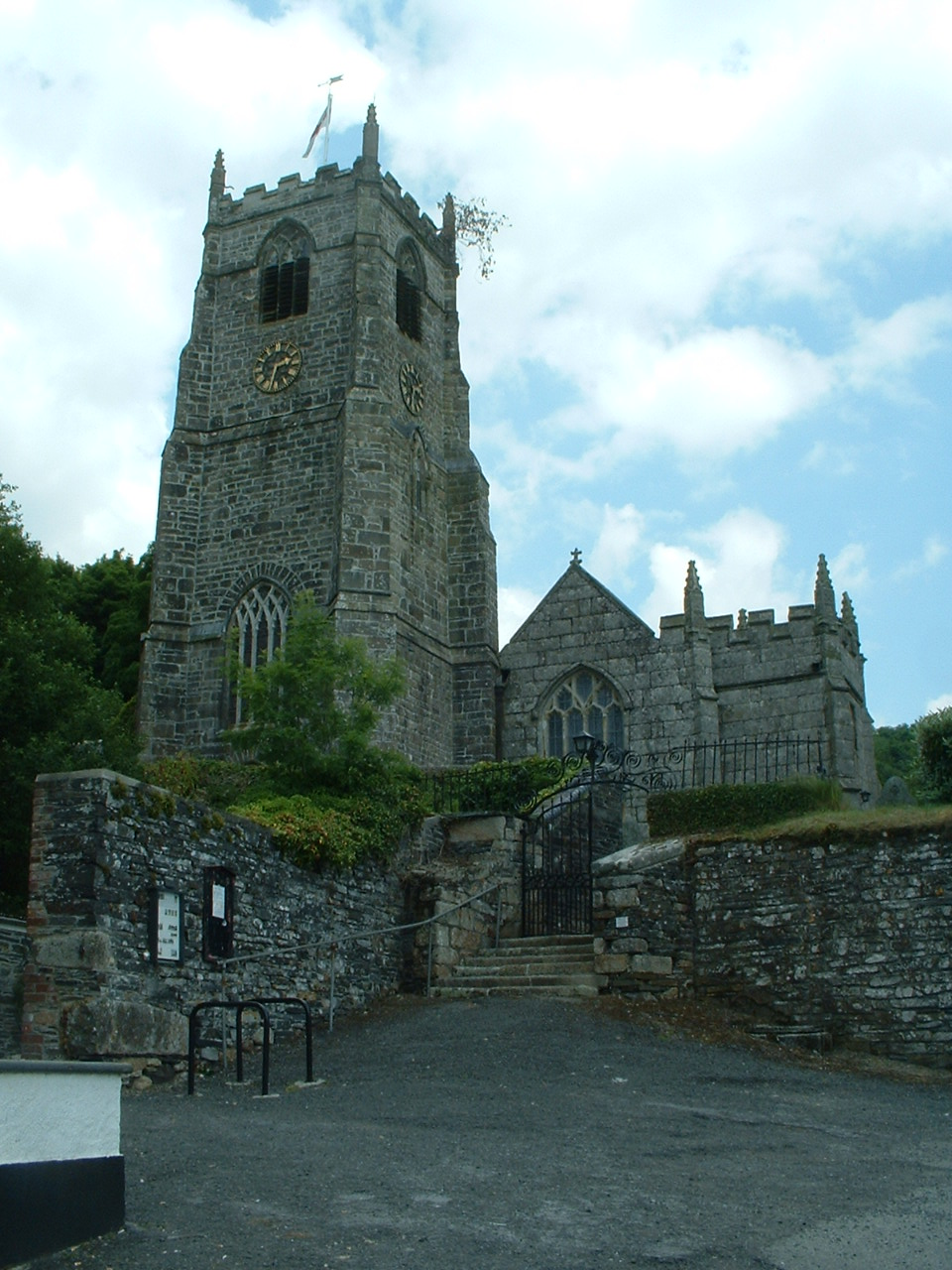
- The church of St Neot

- Location within Cornwall
- OS grid reference: SX185678
- Unitary authority: Cornwall
- Ceremonial county: Cornwall
- Region: South West
- Country: England
- Sovereign state: United Kingdom
- Post town: LISKEARD
- Postcode district: PL14
- Dialling code: 01579
- Police: Devon and Cornwall
- Fire: Cornwall
- Ambulance: South Western
- UK Parliament: South East Cornwall

St Neot (/ˈniːʊt/ NEE-uut) (Cornish: Logniet) is a village and civil parish in Cornwall, England, United Kingdom. The parish population at the 2011 census was 947. It is between the towns of Bodmin and Liskeard.

The parish is named after the Saxon monk, Saint Neot (who also gives his name to St Neots in Cambridgeshire, to where his alleged bones were taken in the early Middle Ages), and means "pleasant (or beautiful) pasture (or habitation)" in Hebrew. On the northern side the parish includes part of Bodmin Moor and hamlets in the parish include Draynes, Ley and Pantersbridge.

== History and antiquities ==
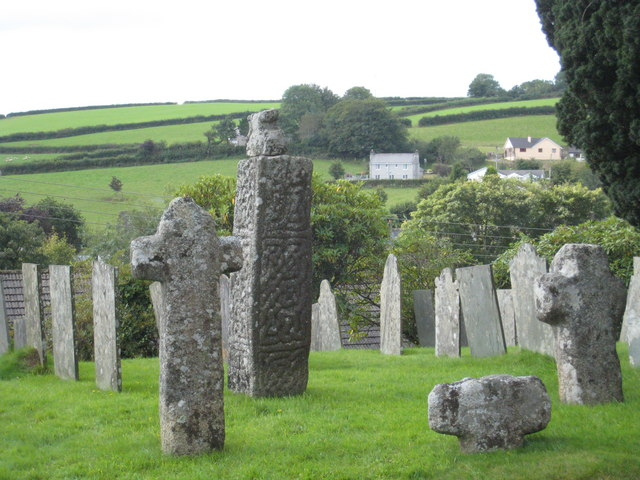
Ancient crosses in St Neot churchyard

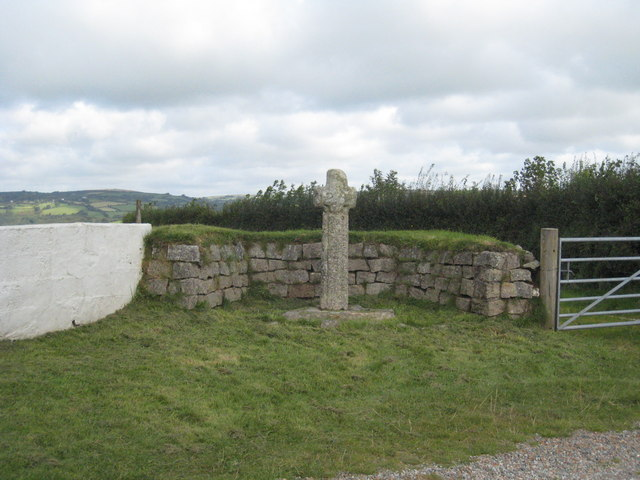
A cross at Tredinnick (found in 1958)

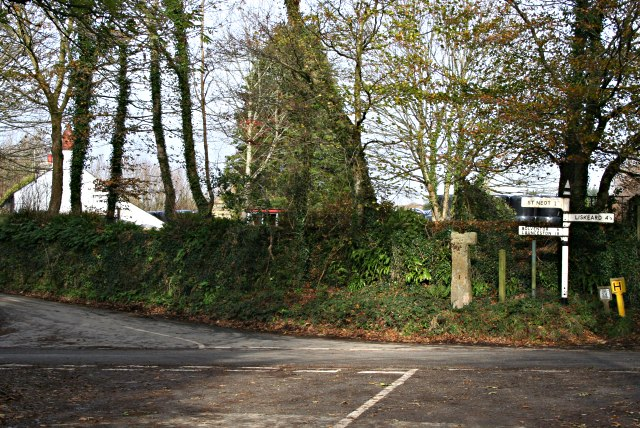
Wenmouth Cross

Arthur Langdon (1896) records eight Cornish crosses and two cross bases in the parish. Four-hole Cross is located by the main Launceston to Bodmin road close to the milestone showing eight miles to Bodmin. The shaft is ornamented on all four sides. The other crosses are three in the vicarage garden, another in the village, another in the churchyard (its shaft is ornamented on all four sides with interlaced carving), and others at Hilltown and Newtown.

The manor of St Neot was recorded in the Domesday Book (1086) when it was held by Odo from Robert, Count of Mortain; it had been held by Godric the priest before 1066. The Count had taken this land away from the clergy of St Neot. There was one hide of land which never paid tax and land for 5 ploughs. There were 1 plough, 3 serfs, 3 villeins, 6 smallholders, 2 cattle, 2 pigs and 30 sheep. The value of the manor was 5 shillings though it had formerly been worth £1 sterling. The priests of St Neot had only one acre of their former land. There were 4 smallholders, 1 ox, 10 goats and 20 sheep.

During the English Civil War St Neot was staunchly Royalist. To commemorate this, each year on Oak Apple Day (29 May), an oak branch is mounted on the top of the church tower to symbolise the historical allegiance.

John Anstis, born and buried at St Neot, was an English officer of arms and antiquarian who rose to the highest heraldic office in England and became Garter King of Arms in 1718. Henry Dangar (1796–1861) was a native of St Neot who became a surveyor and explorer of Australia.

No railway was ever built to the village, despite pressure from local people and mine owners in the 1860s and 1870s. Instead, Doublebois railway station was opened on 1 June 1860 about two miles south of St Neot on the Cornwall Railway main line.

== Parish Church of St Neot ==
The original dedication may have been to 'St Anietus', with whom the Saxon Neot has been confused. In the 11th century a small monastery stood here; the early medieval church building (of which the tower remains) must have been smaller than the current church. Rebuilding in granite was undertaken in the 15th century, and the stained-glass windows – described as "high quality" by Historic England – are from about 1500. The church was designated as Grade I listed in 1987.

The stained glass is partly original and partly from restoration in the 1820s, which was designed by John Hedgeland and painted by James Nixon, both of London. The 16 windows are as follows; they are of 15th- or 16th-century workmanship unless indicated. 1: the Creation window; 2: the Noah window; 3: the Borlase window; 4: the Martyn window; 5: the Motton window; 6: the Callawy window; 7: the Tubbe and Callawy window; 8: an armorial window (Hedgeland); 9: the St George window (15th century); 10: the St Neot window (12 episodes from the legend); 11: the Young Women's window (four saints with the 20 donors below); 12: the Wives' window (Christ and three saints with the 20 donors below); 13: the Harris window; 14: the Redemption window (Hedgeland); 15: the Acts window (Hedgeland); 16: the chancel window, which depicts the Last Supper (Hedgeland; copied from the earliest representation in the British Museum).

Nearby is the holy well of St Neot. Legend tells that the well contained three fish, and an angel told St Neot that as long as he ate no more than one fish a day, their number would never decrease. At a time St Neot fell ill, and his servant went and cooked two of the fish; upon finding this, St Neot prayed for forgiveness and ordered that the fish be returned to the well. As they entered the water, both were miraculously returned to life.

Gallery

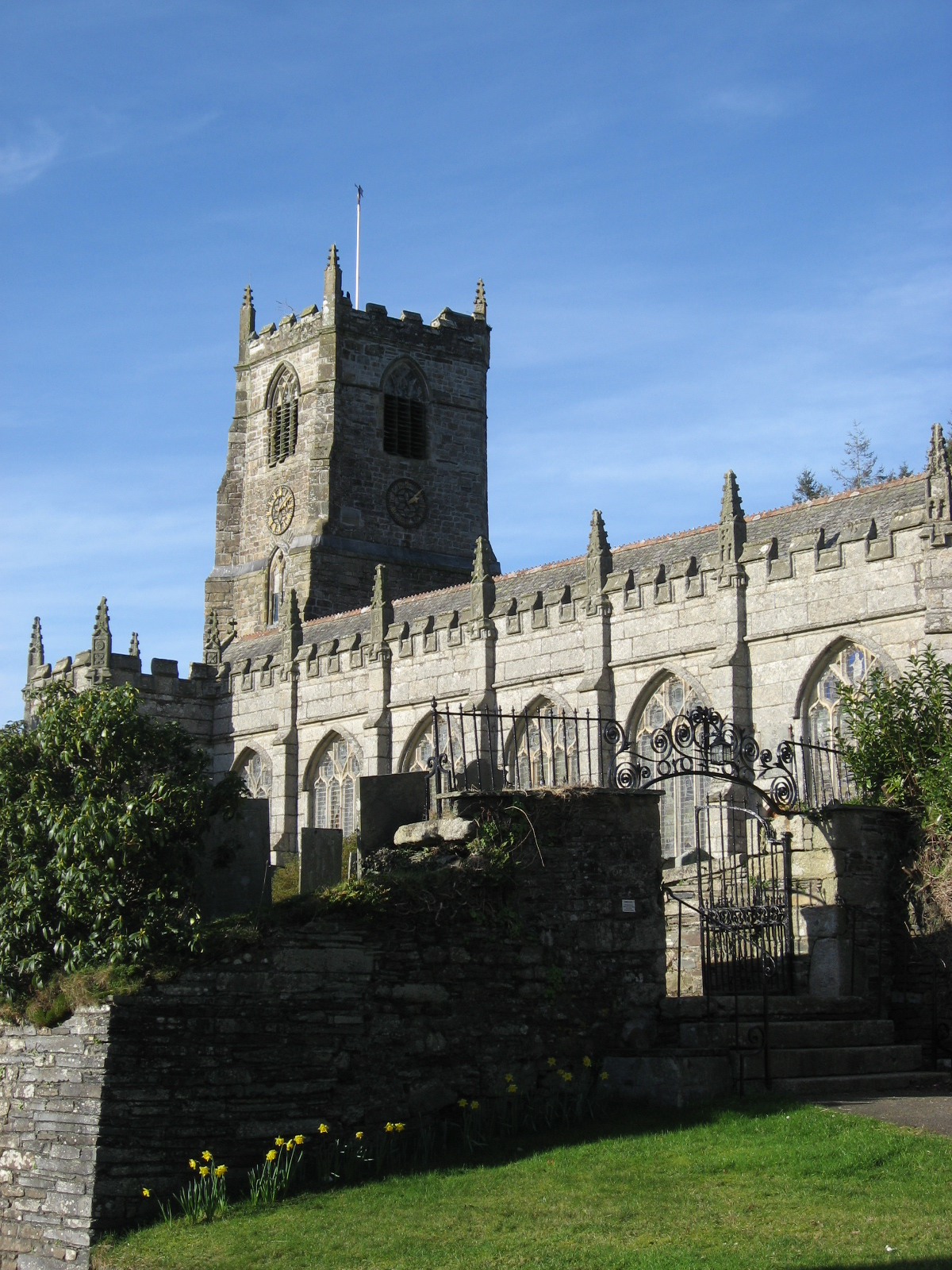
The Church of St Neot, famous for its late medieval stained glass

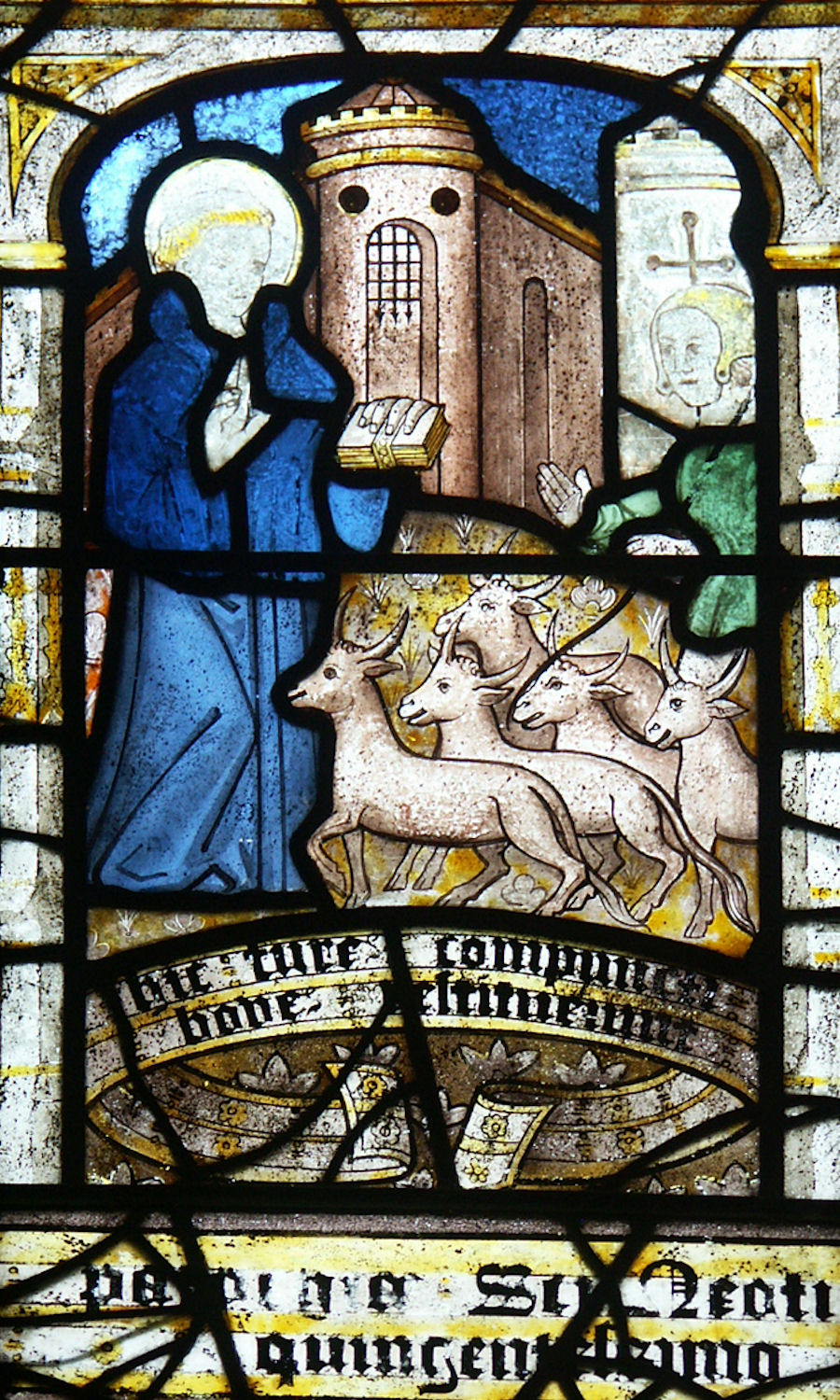
A stained glass window depicting St Neot (detail)

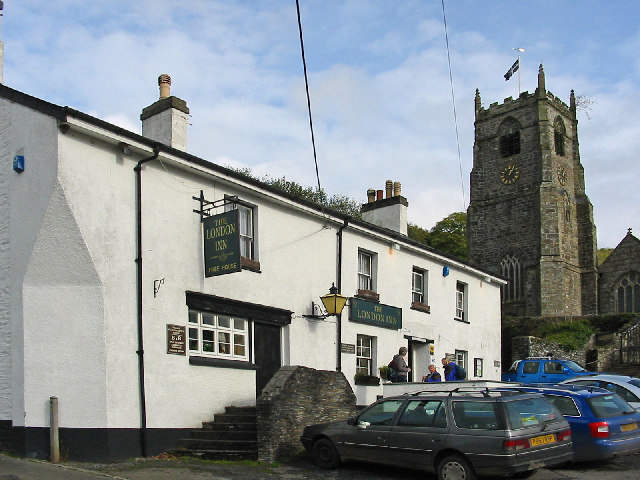
The London Inn

== Other notable buildings ==
Two 15th-century bridges are at Pantersbridge and Treverbyn (crossing the Warleggan and Fowey rivers). Lewarne is a neo-Tudor country house built for the Grylls family in 1869. Treverbyn Vean is a Victorian mansion designed for Colonel Charles Sommers Cocks by two of the greatest Victorian architects, George Gilbert Scott and William Burges. A. G. Langdon (1896) records six stone crosses in the parish, of which three are at the vicarage.

The nearby Carnglaze Caverns, a former slate quarry, forms an unusual music venue.

== Village Award ==
In 2004 and 2006, the village of St Neot won the National Calor Village of the Year award. St Neot also won the Calor Gas Village of the Decade award, which celebrated 10 years of the competition.

== Cornish wrestling ==
St Neot has hosted Cornish wrestling tournaments for prizes in at least the 1800s.

John Charles Corse (1825–1872), originally from St Neot was a champion Cornish wrestler who emigrated to Australia and was known as the "Sydney Champion". He was a blacksmith and claimed to have thrown Gundry, the famous wrestler, before emigrating. In 1852 he was champion of New South Wales and beat Hodge in a high-profile challenge match taking the Australian title. He successfully defended the title in 1856 against Burns. He became champion of Victoria and was Cornish wrestling champion of Australia in 1857. He was murdered by being shot in the back of the head.

== Twinning ==
- Malgeneg, Brittany, France
