= List of alumni of Emmanuel College, Cambridge =

This is a list of alumni of Emmanuel College, Cambridge.

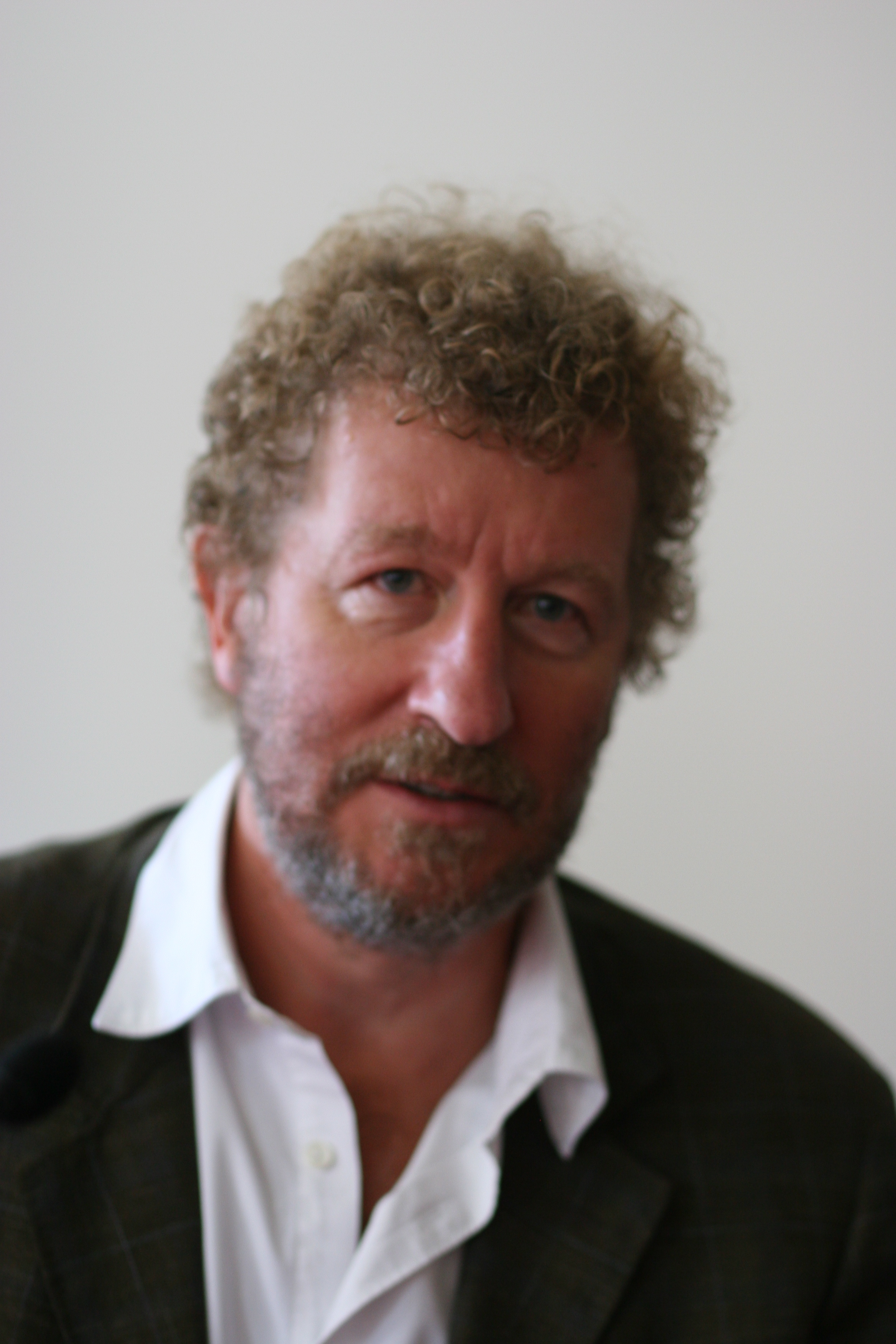
Sebastian Faulks, novelist

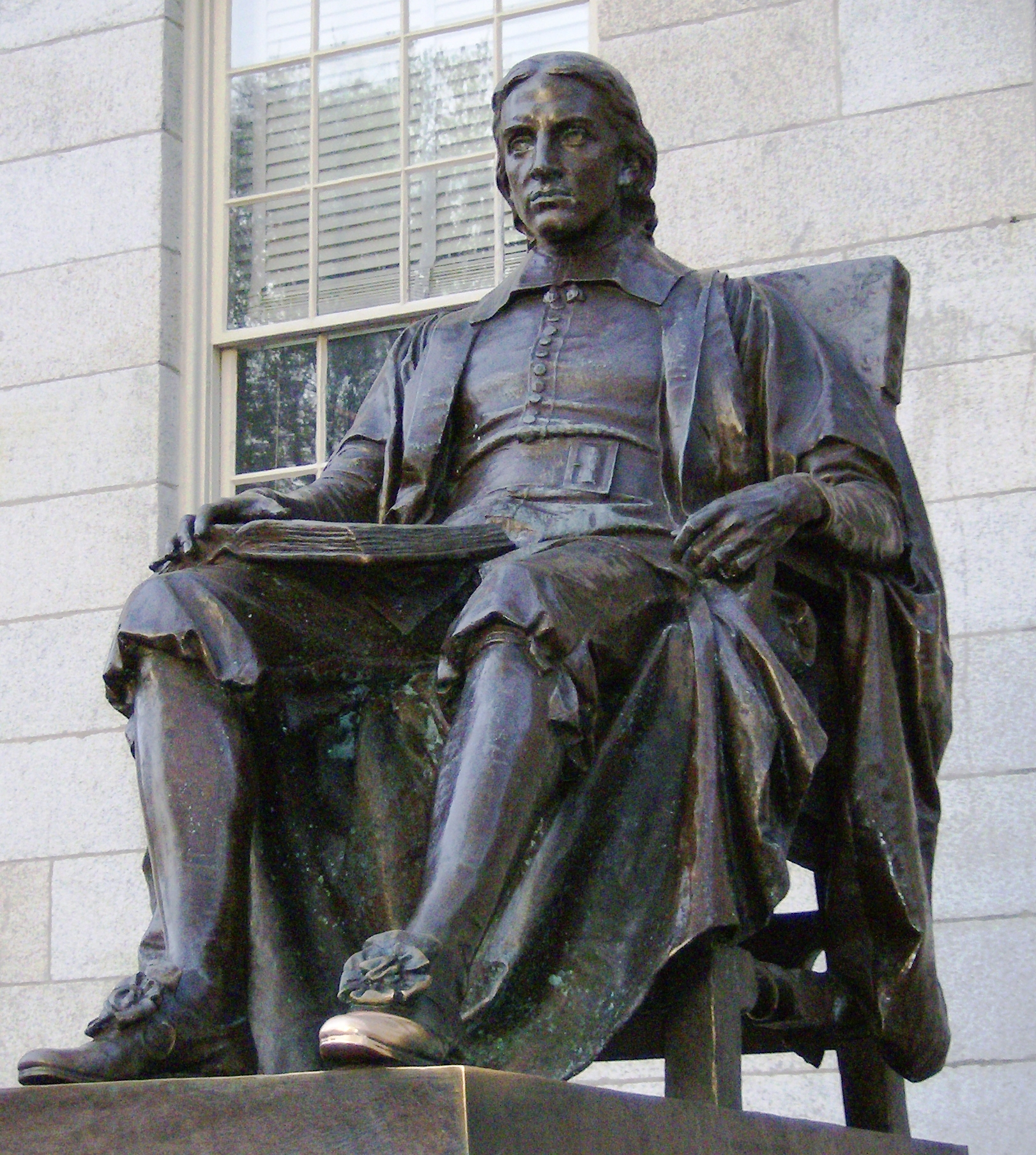
John Harvard, one of the founders of Harvard College

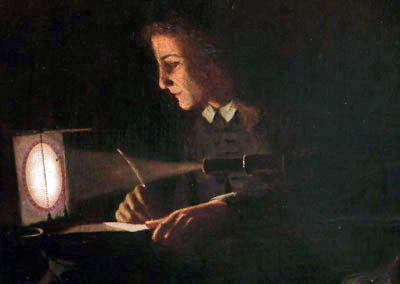
Jeremiah Horrocks, astronomer

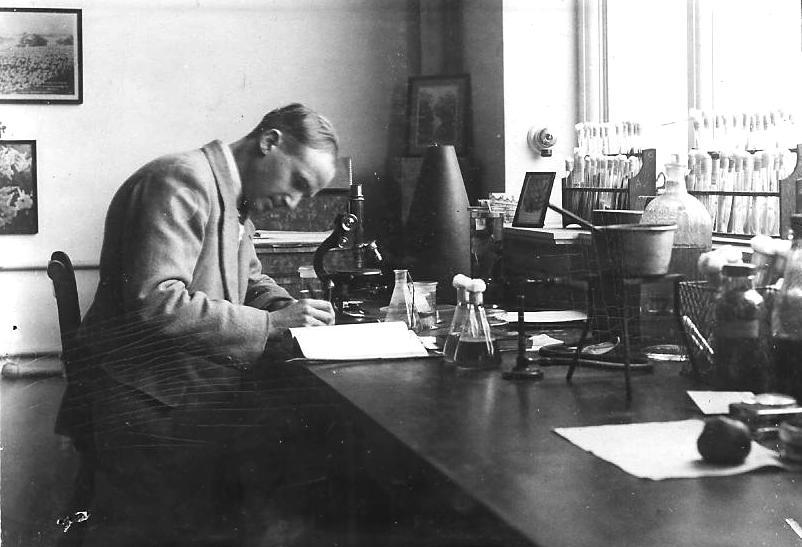
Lawrence Ogilvie, plant pathologist

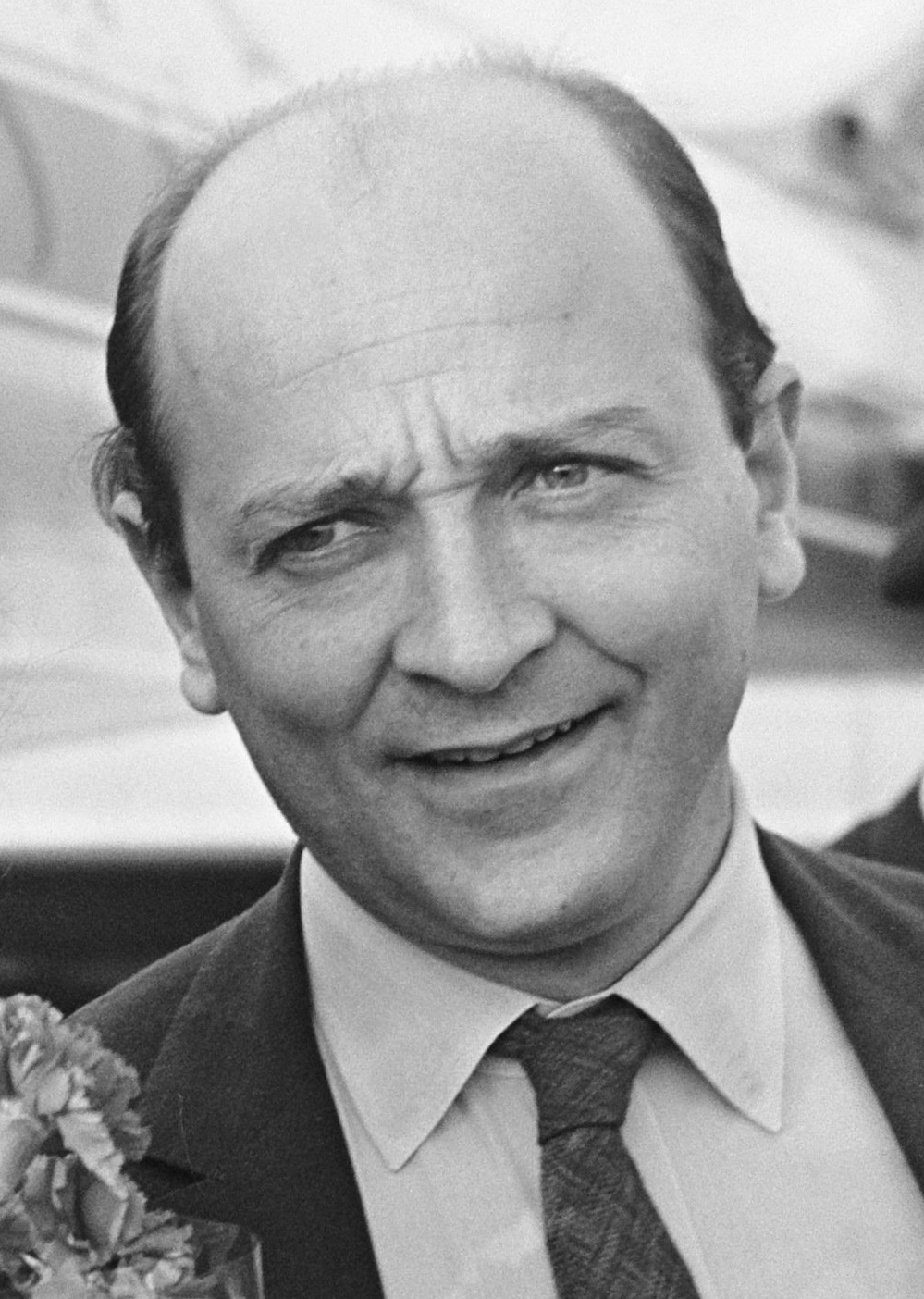
Karel Reisz, filmmaker

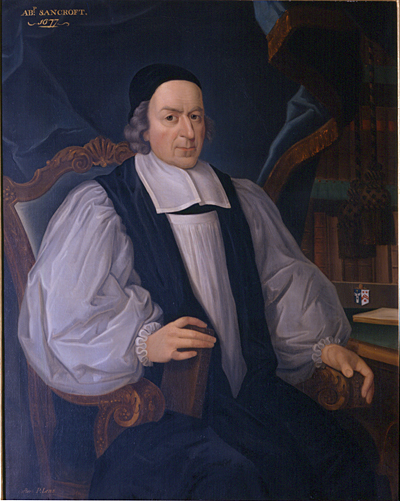
William Sancroft, 79th Archbishop of Canterbury

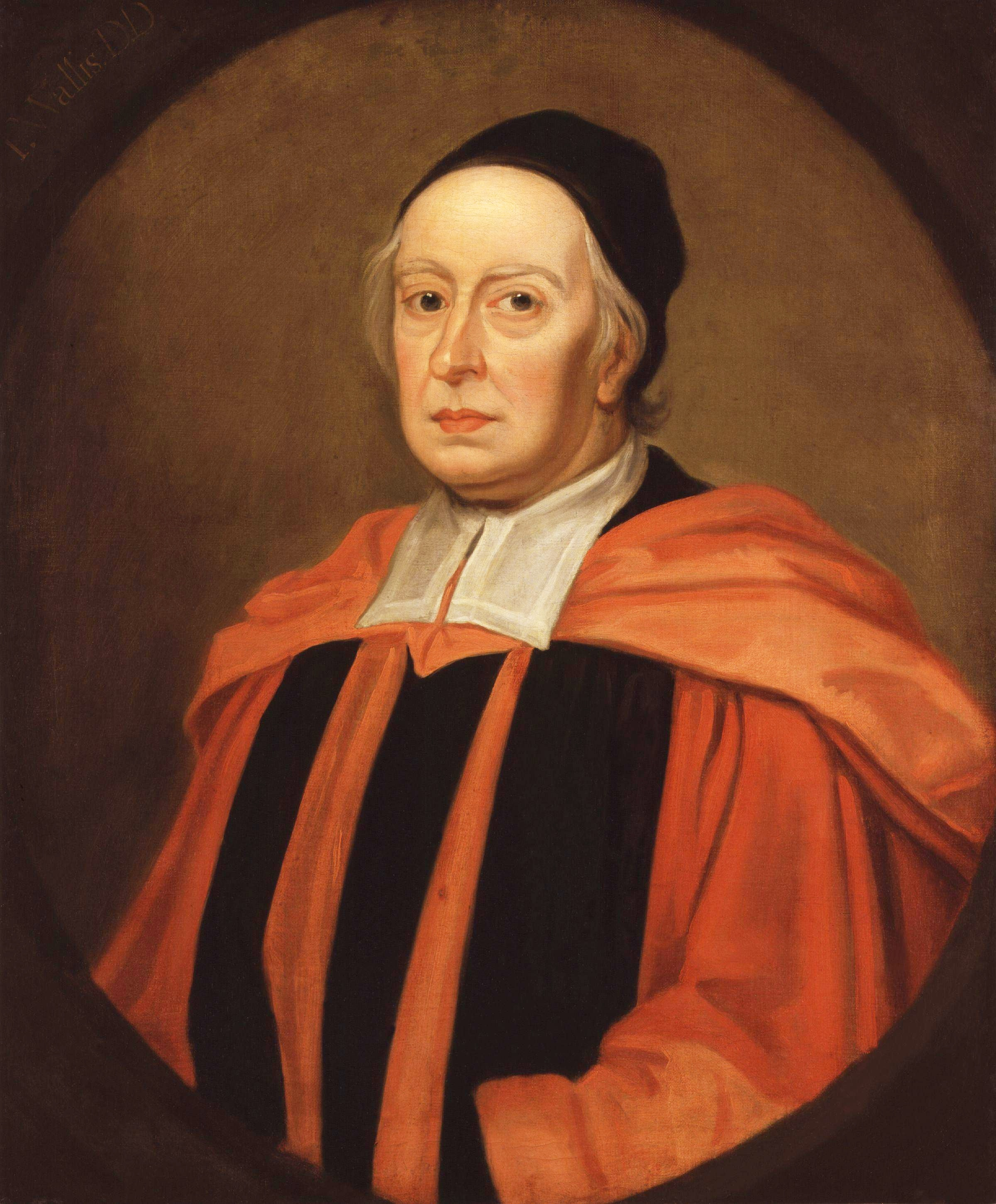
John Wallis, mathematician

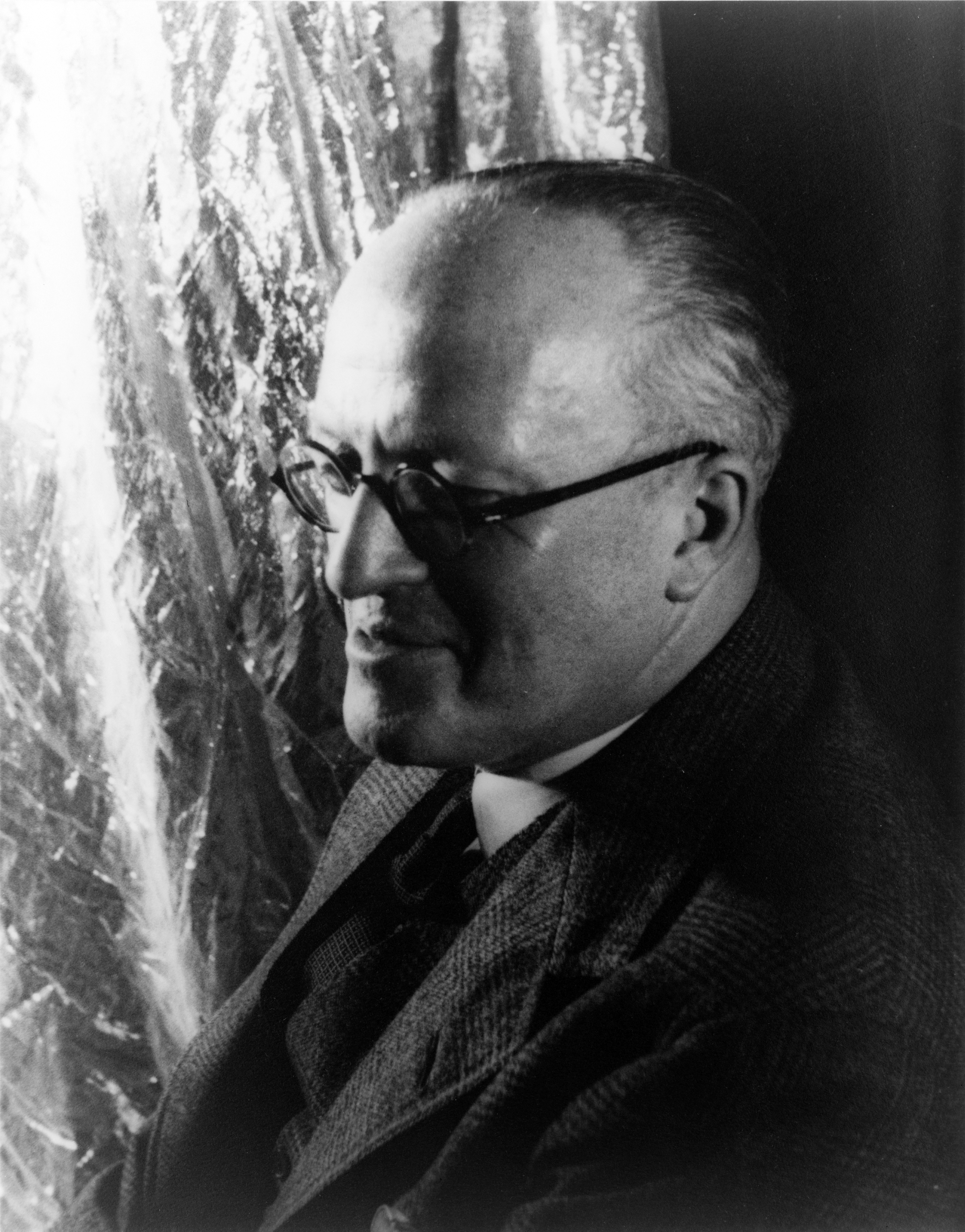
Hugh Walpole, English novelist

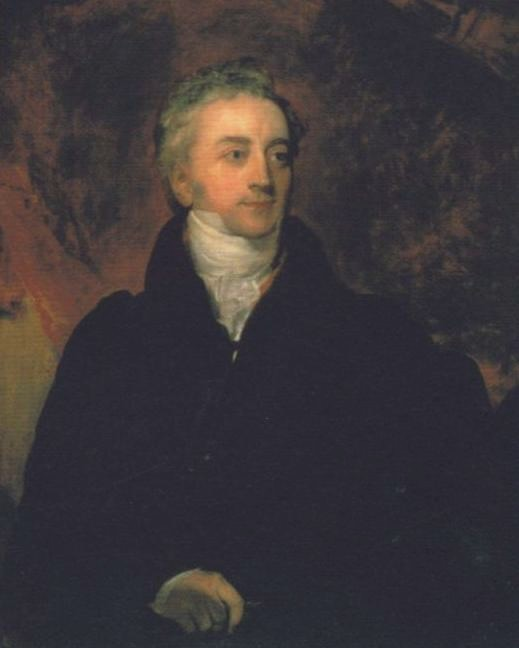
Thomas Young, polymath and physician
- Stig Abell
- Arthur Robin Adair, diplomat
- Choudhary Rahmat Ali
- Peter Bayley
- Charlie Bean
- John Desmond Bernal
- Ian Black, journalist and author
- Archie Bland
- Peregrine Bland
- Andrew Bowie, philosopher
- Angus Bowie
- Ajahn Brahm
- Malcolm Brenner
- Stephen Burgess
- John Burnett, historian
- Samantha Butler, neurobiologist
- Fergus Butler-Gallie, priest and writer
- Henry Cantrell
- Don Carson, theologian
- Graham Chapman
- Alan J. Charig
- Morville Chote
- Joe Craig
- Francis Darwin
- Umar Bin Muhammad Daudpota
- Gerald Davies
- Simon Davies, lawyer
- Leonard Dawe
- Walter Duranty
- Gurusaday Dutt
- John Evelyn (1591–1664)
- Sebastian Faulks
- Reo Fortune
- James Fox, art historian
- Michael Frayn
- Graeme Garden
- Edward Pritchard Gee
- Edward George, Baron George
- John Gosden
- Dick Greenwood
- Joseph Hall, Bishop
- Clare Hammond
- John Harvard, one of the founders of Harvard College
- Edith Heard, epigenetics researcher
- Freddie Highmore
- Richard Holmes, military historian
- Thomas Hooker
- Jeremiah Horrocks
- Sir Fred Hoyle, astronomer
- Jonathan James-Moore
- Griff Rhys Jones
- Majid Khan (born 1946), cricketer
- Tom King, Baron King of Bridgwater
- Edgar Ord Laird, diplomat
- F. R. Leavis
- John Lennox
- Gordon Luce
- Garry John Martin, novelist
- Rory McGrath, writer and comedian
- Scott Mead, photographer
- Alexander Morrison, judge
- Richard W. Murphy
- Ronald Norrish
- Mary-Ann Ochota
- Maggie O'Farrell
- Lawrence Ogilvie
- C. Northcote Parkinson
- Cecil Parkinson
- Steven Poole
- George Porter
- Karel Reisz
- Andrew Graham Rice, executive
- Hugo Rifkind

A flag bearing the college's arms, which was flown by Brian Birley Roberts on his sledge during the British Graham Land Expedition in Antarctica.

- Brian Birley Roberts
- Alan Rouse
- Peter Rubin
- Stephen Sackur
- Birbal Sahni
- William Sancroft
- Bobby Seagull
- Emma Sidi
- Herchel Smith
- Dan Stevens
- Anthony Stone
- Stephen Timms
- William Tobin, astronomer
- Justine Waddell
- John Wallis, mathematician
- Hugh Walpole, novelist
- Thomas Watson
- Eugen Weber
- Bob Wilkinson
- Charles Williams, Olympian
- Steve Woolgar
- Wu Lien-teh
- Tim Yeo
- Benjamin Yeoh
- Thomas Young, polymath
