= Andrew Rice (disambiguation) =

Andrew Rice (born 1973) is an American politician from Oklahoma.

Andrew Rice may also refer to:

- Andrew Rice (Virginia politician), American prosecutor and politician from Virginia
- Andrew Rice (American football) (born c. 1989), American college football coach
- Andrew E. Rice (1922–2010), American academic and expert on international development
- Andrew Graham Rice (1950–2024), British executive
- Andy Rice (1940–2018), American football player
