= Redruth Grammar School =

Coordinates: 50.231°N 5.239°W

Redruth Grammar School in Redruth, Cornwall, was a boys school between 1907 and 1976.

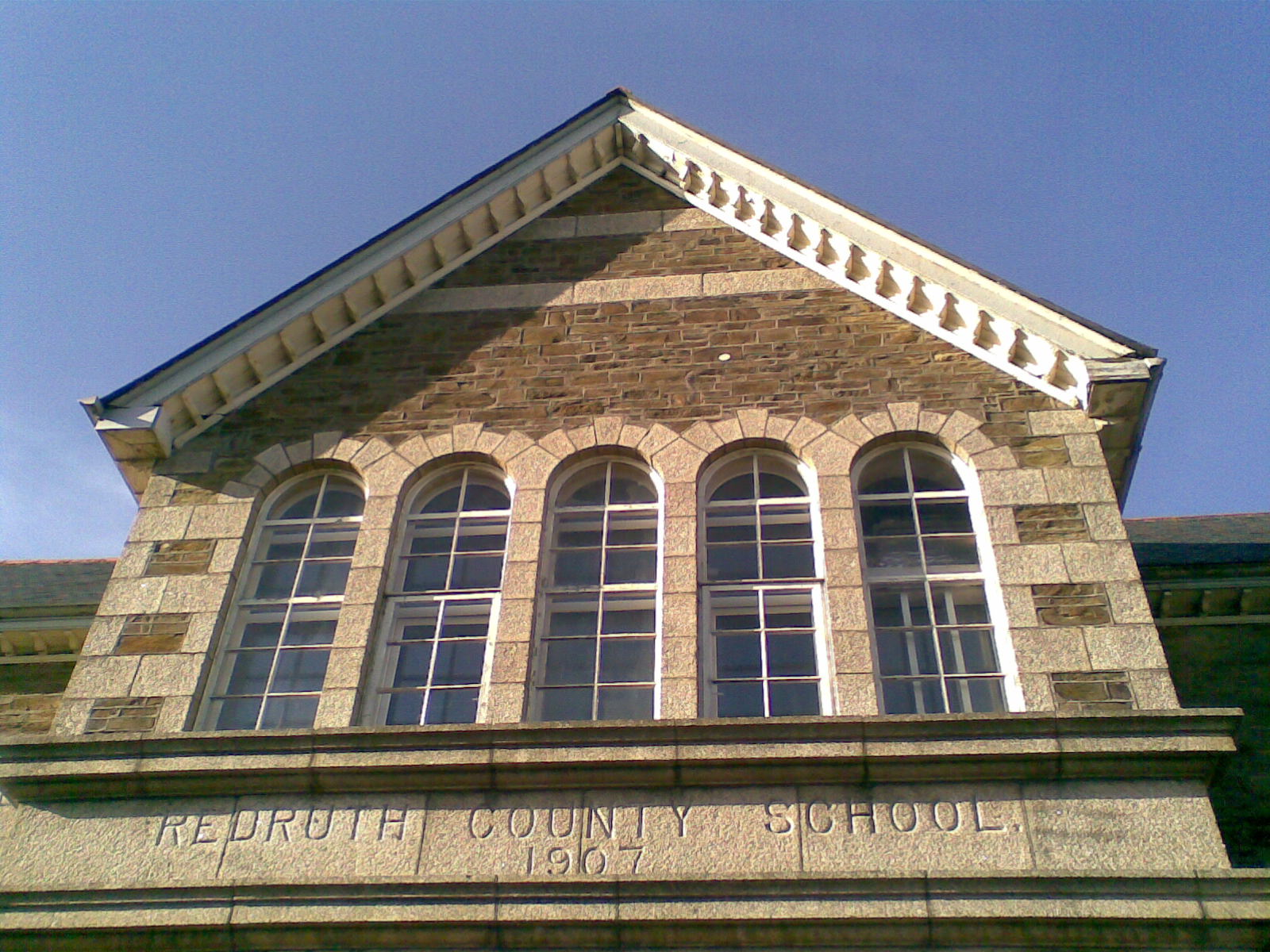
Former Grammar School in Redruth

== History ==
The school was opened on 5 October 1907 by General Sir Redvers Buller. It was originally built to accommodate 150 pupils and to serve the Camborne-Redruth area, extending from Gwithian in the west to St. Agnes in the east and south to villages such as St Day and Troon. (Girls from this same area attended Camborne Grammar School).

On 23 May 1921, the Prince of Wales (later king Edward VIII) visited the school, and was presented to all the children and ex-servicemen of the neighbourhood. The school had a tuck shop run by "old Buck". In 1973 the new art block was opened by the Secretary of State for Education and Science, Margaret Thatcher.

== Merger ==
In 1976, the school merged with the nearby Tolgus Secondary School to create Redruth School, and served as the "West Park" section of the school until 2002, when a new building was constructed nearer the Tolgus site.

== Subsequent use of site ==
The buildings remained disused until 2006 when the site of the old Redruth Grammar School was handed over to the Cornwall Arts Centre Trust. The buildings have now been completely renovated and extended, and are now used as an arts hub for creative businesses.

== Notable former pupils ==
- Peter Bayley (1944-2018), scholar of French literature.
- Ronald Bottrall, poet
- Rory McGrath, comedian
- Peter Rickard, Fellow, Emmanuel College, Cambridge
- D. M. Thomas, Cornish poet, translator, novelist, editor, biographer and playwright

== Headmasters ==
- T. Shopland (1907-1931)
- F. W. Weatherill (1931-1964)
- A. S. Worrall (1964-1967)
- Arthur Parkes (1967-1976)
