= Northampton Chronicle & Echo =

Newspaper in Northampton, England

- Type: Local newspaper
- Format: Tabloid
- Owner: National World
- Editor: David Summers
- Language: English
- Headquarters: Albert House; Victoria Street; Northampton; NN1 3NR
- Circulation: 4,380 (as of 2023)
- Website: northamptonchron.co.uk

The Northampton Chronicle & Echo (known locally as "The Chron") is a local newspaper serving Northampton, England, and the surrounding towns and villages. It was published daily from Monday-Saturday until 26 May 2012 at a price. It then began to publish one edition per week each Thursday. The paper is owned by National World.

== Origin ==
The title was the result of a 1931 merger of two dailies: the Northampton Daily Chronicle and Evening Herald (founded 1880) and the Daily Echo (founded in 1885 and retitled as the Northampton Daily Echo in 1908), which occupied a striking art deco office building overlooking Northampton's famous market square. This was demolished in the late 1970s to make way for a shopping development. A blue plaque marks the spot where the Daily Echo was published for almost a century. The Chronicle & Echo and its associated titles moved to new quarters at Upper Mounts. Printing in Northampton ceased at the time of the weekly change in 2012 and is now done at the Johnson Press location in Peterborough.

== Related media ==
A glossy monthly, the Northampton Town and County Independent, edited by Bernard Holloway and the local author-editor Lou Warwick, was also published by the same company, which was once part of the United Newspapers group headed by Lord Barnetson. One of the Chronicle's sister papers in those days was the Yorkshire Post.

The Chron's main competitor was the weekly Northampton Herald & Post (circulation 45,582), which was free and delivered throughout the town and surrounding areas but was in comparison lighter on news and heavy on advertising, until it ceased publishing in 2016. Until 2015, the Chron issued a free version of the weekly Northampton Mercury with a circulation of 44,000 to compete with its rival.

== Staff ==
Among the Chronicle & Echo's most notable journalists were author Michael Green, who wrote The Art of Coarse Rugby, scriptwriter Alistair Foot, the Guardian's readers' editor Ian Mayes, chairman of the Sportswriters Association Barry Newcombe, former Boxing Board of Control general secretary John Morris, theatre historian Lou Warwick, and author and editor John Marquis (formerly of Reuters and Thomson Newspapers), whose books about the Sir Harry Oakes murder case and the Haitian tyrant Papa Doc have found an international audience. Valentine Low, a journalist on the Times, columnists Yvonne Roberts and Matthew Engel also worked on what is known locally as "The Chron". Helen Blaby writes a general interest column.

Michael Green's novel Don't Print My Name Upside Down was based largely on his experiences at the Chronicle & Echo. The paper's chief sub-editor Stanley Worker kept a copy in his desk and, during rare dull moments, would proudly peek at references to himself. Green's book The Art of Coarse Acting was based on his experiences as an amateur actor at Northampton's amateur drama group the Masque Theatre.

Green, Foot, Marquis and Warwick were all at different times editor of the Chronicle's long-running daily 'chat' page, called Town Talk and County Gossip by Hamtune. Three went on to become authors and the fourth (Foot) a playwright. Mayes has also published compilations of his 'corrections and clarifications' columns in The Guardian. Two went on to become editors: Lou Warwick of the Northampton Town and County Independent, John Marquis of the Packet Newspapers group in Cornwall and The Tribune (a morning newspaper) in the Bahamas.

Both John Morris and John Marquis were also London Sports Editors and Chief Boxing Correspondents of major newspaper groups—Morris of United Newspapers (Yorkshire Post, Lancashire Evening Post and Chronicle & Echo) and Marquis of Thomson Regional Newspapers (The Scotsman, the Western Mail, the Press and Journal and The Journal).

Among the Chronicle & Echo's editors were W Cowper Barrons, John Barrons, Vincent Halton, Gerald Freeman, Philip Green and Mark Edwards. One of the company's most notable figures was L W Dickens, long-serving editor of The Mercury and Herald, in its heyday the 'bible' of Northamptonshire farmers. Another of the company's characters was the photographer Roland Holloway, who worked on the Chronicle, Mercury and Independent for half a century. He was born in 1905, the same year his father William Henry Holloway launched the Independent. During a career running from the 1920s to the 1970s, Roland took more than 80,000 photographs and attended 28,000 assignments. A collection of his work was published in book form in 1985. It was called Roland Holloway's Northamptonshire, Fifty Years of Photographs 1924–1974, published by Northamptonshire Libraries.

== Sponsorship ==
In the 1994–95 English football season the company sponsored local team Northampton Town F.C.

== See also ==
- List of newspapers in the United Kingdom
- Northamptonshire Evening Telegraph
