= Redruth School =

Location
- Tolgus Vean; Redruth, Cornwall, TR15 1TA; England
- Coordinates: 50°14′04″N 5°14′18″W

Information
- Type: Foundation school
- Motto: Expect the Best
- Established: c. 1976
- Local authority: Cornwall Council
- Department for Education URN: 112054 Tables
- Ofsted: Reports
- Headteacher: Craig Bonds
- Deputy Headteachers: Beth Haslam
- Gender: Coeducational
- Age: 11 to 16
- Enrolment: 1,399 students (2022-2023)
- Houses: Marconi, Holman, Murdoch, Brunel
- Colours: Red, Black and
- Publication: The Carn
- Website: www.redruth.cornwall.sch.uk

Redruth School is a secondary school in Redruth, Cornwall, England, for pupils aged 11 to 16. It was formed in 1976 by the merger of Redruth Grammar School and Tolgus Secondary School.

The sports fields of the school are also used as a venue for the Westward League Cross Country running competitions once a year. The school has extensive sports facilities, such as a swimming pool, a fitness suite and a gymnasium.

Craig Martin, the former headteacher of the school, left the position in 2022. He was headteacher for twelve years. The school's fitness suite has been renamed in his honour.

== Notable former pupils ==
- Richard James AKA Aphex Twin, musician, attended the school, and named a song on the re-release of his Surfing on Sine Waves album after it.
- Helen Blaby, BBC reporter and newspaper columnist
- Rory McGrath, British comedian, television personality, and writer
- Molly Caudery, Glasgow 2024 indoor championship gold medal pole vaulter, commonwealth silver medal pole vaulter
