= Angus M. Bowie =

British academic

- Born: Angus Morton Bowie; 1949 (age 76–77)

Academic background
- Education: St Peter's School, York
- Alma mater: Emmanuel College, Cambridge
- Doctoral advisor: P. E. Easterling

Academic work
- Discipline: Classics
- Institutions: University of Liverpool (1976–1981); The Queen's College, Oxford

Angus Morton Bowie (born 1949) is a British academic, Emeritus Lobel fellow in Classics at The Queen's College, Oxford. His research interests include Homer, Herodotus, Greek lyric, tragedy and comedy, Virgil, Greek mythology, structuralism, narratology, and other theories of literature.

== Biography ==
After attending St Peter's School, York, Bowie studied for his undergraduate and graduate degrees at Emmanuel College, Cambridge, under the academic supervision of P. E. Easterling. He was employed as a Lecturer from 1976 at the Greek Department of the University of Liverpool for five years. He received his PhD in 1979 and moved to Queen's College, Oxford, in 1981. In 1987 he taught a semester at Berkeley. Apart from Lobel Fellow and Tutor in Classics (from Praelector to Associate Professor), he also served as Senior Tutor (1981–1987) and Fellow Librarian at The Queen's College, as Chair of the Faculty of Classics (2011–2014), and as Assessor of the University of Oxford for a year.

An international conference on Greek comedy in honour of Bowie took place in May 2017.

His younger brother, Andrew, is an academic philosopher.

On 4 May 2018, he delivered a eulogy at the funeral of his long-time partner, Peter Bayley, onetime Drapers Professor of French at the University of Cambridge.

== Contributions ==
Bowie's first book (based on his doctoral thesis) addressed the relationship between the language of the Lesbian poets, Homer, and spoken Aeolic. He showed that the language of Sappho and Alcaeus was a true poetic diction, the traditions of which stem form a poetic Koine, and that the origins of this Koine are presumably to be sought back in the Mycenaean period at least.

His most influential book has been Aristophanes: Myth, Ritual and Comedy (1993; reprinted in 1994, 1995, 1996, 2005; and translated into Modern Greek in 1999), in which he traces patterns from mythology, rituals, and rites of passage in the extant Aristophanic comedies (usually found in a reversed form than expected). In a decade when structuralism was seen as outdated and restrictive by classicists, and deconstruction was becoming more and more popular, this book contributed to a positive re-evaluation of structuralist approaches to literature. Later (and contemporary) scholarship in the field has confirmed that "Future studies of myth and ritual in Aristophanes and other poets of Old Comedy, will surely be indebted to Bowie's important first steps".

Bowie's Cambridge commentary on Herodotus is "particularly strong and up to date in its synthesis of historical and literary observations. In this sense his work outshines earlier, unsatisfactory English commentaries on Book 8". As for Odyssey XIII-XIV, also in the Cambridge 'green and yellow' series, "the text is Bowie's own, though he has not consulted the MSS. It is provided with a spare apparatus criticus. The bibliography is abundant and modern. The notes that accompany the commentary are exemplary. Bowie gives just the right amount of information, whether it is on the history of the word, or its usage, or background of a custom. Every so often he intersperses a prose summary of the text coming up, marvels of compression and lucidity."

== Monographs and edited volumes ==
- (1981) The Poetic Dialect of Sappho and Alcaeus (New York).
- (1993) Aristophanes: Myth, Ritual, and Comedy (Cambridge; New York).
- (2004) with I. De Jong and R. Nünlist (eds.), Narrators, Narratees, and Narratives in Ancient Greek Literature (Leiden).
- (2007) Herodotus: Histories, Book VIII (Cambridge).
- (2013) Homer: Odyssey, Books XIII and XIV (Cambridge).
- (2019) Homer: Iliad, Book III (Cambridge).

Forthcoming:

- Homer: Iliad 21–24 (Greek and Latin Writers Series: Fondazione Lorenzo Valla and Arnoldo Mondadori Editore)
