= Peter Bayley (scholar of French literature) =

British scholar of French literature (1944-2018)

- Born: 20 November 1944; Redruth, Cornwall
- Died: 10 April 2018 (aged 73)
- Partner: Angus Bowie
- Awards: Commandeur de l'Ordre des Palmes Académiques

Academic background
- Education: Redruth Grammar School
- Alma mater: Emmanuel College, Cambridge

Academic work
- Discipline: French literature
- Sub-discipline: 17th-century French literature, sermons and essays
- Institutions: Fellow of Gonville and Caius College, Cambridge (1971–2018); Drapers Professor of French, University of Cambridge (1985–2011)

Peter James Bayley (20 November 1944 – 10 April 2018) was a British scholar of French literature, specialising in 17th-century French literature, sermons and essays. He was Drapers Professor of French at the University of Cambridge from 1985 to 2011, and a Fellow of Gonville and Caius College, Cambridge from 1971 until his death.

== Biography ==
Peter Bayley was born in Portreath, Cornwall, and was educated at Redruth Grammar School. In 1963, he went up to Emmanuel College, Cambridge to read modern and mediaeval languages (French and Spanish); in 1966, he graduated with a First. He continued at Emmanuel as a postgraduate student, and in 1969 was elected to a Research Fellowship. In 1971, he was awarded his PhD for a thesis on 17th-century French sermons. That same year, he was appointed to a college lectureship at, and was elected Fellow of, Gonville and Caius College. In 1974, he was appointed university assistant lecturer in the Department of French; and in 1978, university lecturer.

In 1982, Peter Rickard retired as Drapers Professor of French. Bayley was appointed acting head of department. The process of electing a new Drapers Professor was a protracted one, and he was installed in the chair only in 1985. At that time, it was unusual for Cambridge professors to supervise undergraduates; but Bayley did. Other offices he took on were: various college posts; 1989–1997, vice-president of the Association of University Professors and Heads of French; 1990–1992, president of the Society for French Studies; 1994–1996, member of the executive of the University Council for Modern Languages; and 2000–2002, chairman of the (newly formed) School of Arts and Humanities at Cambridge.

In 2006, he suffered a stroke, and a bad fall. He never fully recovered his faculties, and was unable to complete his monograph on the oratory of Jacques-Bénigne Bossuet (1627–1704). His friends had the novel and distressing experience of finding themselves the dominant partners in conversations. In 2011, he retired, and was presented by his colleagues with a volume in his honour containing contributions by leading scholars from the United Kingdom, France and North America. He increasingly spent his days at the house in Hackleton, Northamptonshire he shared with his partner Angus Bowie, classicist, of The Queen's College, Oxford; who delivered the eulogy at his funeral in Caius Chapel on 4 May 2018.

== Honours ==
In 1988, Bayley was made an Officier (Officer) of the Ordre des Palmes Académiques by France. In 2006, he was promoted to Commandeur (Commander): this is the highest rank of the order and he was the first British academic under retirement age to achieve it.

== Selected works ==
- Bayley, Peter (1980). French pulpit oratory, 1598–1650: a study in themes and styles, with a descriptive catalogue of printed texts. Cambridge: Cambridge University Press. ISBN 9780521168359.
- Bayley, Peter; Coleman, Dorothy Gabe, eds. (1982). The Equilibrium of wit: essays for Odette de Mourgues. French Forum. ISBN 978-0917058356.
- Bayley, Peter; Canovas, Frédéric, eds. (2003). Présences du Moyen Âge et de la Renaissance en France au XVIIe siècle (in French). Weidler. ISBN 9783896937155.
