= Ronald Bottrall =

Cornish poet (1906–1989)

(Francis James) Ronald Bottrall OBE, (2 September 1906, Camborne, Cornwall – 25 June 1989) was a Cornish poet. He was praised highly by Anthony Burgess and Martin Seymour-Smith, and deprecated by Ian Hamilton and Martin Amis.

== Life ==
Bottrall was educated at Redruth Grammar School and at Pembroke College, Cambridge. He held notable international academic posts before and during World War II. From 1929 to 1931, he taught in Helsinki. In 1931, he published his first collection of poetry,The Loosening and other Poems, a book heavily influenced by the work of Ezra Pound. Bottrall then spent two years working in the United States. At this time, Bottrall's poetry began to attract critical interest. The Loosening and other Poems and Festival of Fire (1934) were praised by F.R. Leavis. During the mid-1930s he was based at Raffles College in Singapore, before moving to the British Institute of Florence in 1937 as political tensions were rising in Europe. Bottrall was appointed as Secretary of SOAS in 1939 for the duration of the War, while serving on reserve during the War's early years and during a brief posting in neutral Sweden. Starting in 1945 much of the rest of his professional and literary career was spent in Rome, first with the British Council and later at the food agency of the United Nations, the Food and Agriculture Organization. During the post-War period, he also held several British Council or diplomatic posts in Brazil, Greece, and Japan.

Bottrall's 1946 book Selected Poems carried an introduction by Edith Sitwell, where she lauded Bottrall's poems, saying they "draw wealth from depth."

== Career ==
- Lector in English, University of Helsinki, Finland, 1929–31
- "Harkness Fellowship|Commonwealth fund fellowship, Princeton University, USA, 1931–33". The Independent. 26 March 1996.
- Johore Professor of English Language and Literature, Raffles College, Singapore, 1933–37
- Assistant Director, British Institute, Florence, Italy, 1937–38
- Secretary, SOAS, 1939–45
- Air Ministry: Temporary Administrative Officer, 1940; Priority Officer, 1941
- British Council Representative: in Sweden, 1941; in Italy, 1945; in Brazil, 1954; in Greece, 1957; in Japan (and Cultural Counsellor, HM Embassy, Tokyo), 1959
- Controller of Education, British Council, 1950–54
- Chief, Fellowships and Training Branch, Food and Agriculture Organization, 1963–65.

== Honours and awards ==
- OBE, 1949.
- Coronation Medal, 1953
- Syracuse International Poetry Prize, 1954
- Fellow of the Royal Society of Literature, 1955
- Knight of St. John, 1972
- Grande Ufficiale dell'Ordine al Merito della Repubblica Italiana, 1973
- Knight Commander, Order of St. John of Jerusalem, Malta, 1977

== Personal life ==
He was the father of Anthony Bottrall, the diplomat, expert in developmental agriculture and politician.

== Publications ==
=== Poetry ===
- The Loosening and other Poems, 1931
- Festivals of Fire, 1934
- The Turning Path, 1939
- Farewell and Welcome, 1945
- Selected Poems, 1946
- The Palisades of Fear, 1949
- Adam Unparadised, 1954
- Collected Poems, 1961
- Day and Night, 1974
- Poems 1955–73, 1974
- Reflections on the Nile, 1980
- Against a Setting Sun, 1983

=== Other ===
- (with Gunnar Ekelöf) T.S. Eliot: Dikter i Urval, 1942
- (with Margaret Bottrall) The Zephyr Book of English Verse, 1945
- (with Margaret Bottrall) Collected English Verse, 1946
- Rome (Art Centres of the World), 1968.
