= Drapers Professor of French =

The Drapers Professorship of French is a professorship in the study of the French language at the University of Cambridge. It was founded in 1919 by a donation from the Worshipful Company of Drapers, and was the first chair in French established at Cambridge. Its establishment was part of the growth of the study of modern European languages such as French, German, and Italian in the early 19th century. The Drapers Company initially guaranteed to fund the chair at £800 per year for ten years; the grant was renewed in 1939.

== Drapers Professors ==
- Oliver Herbert Phelps Prior (1919)
- Frederick Charles Green (1934)
- Lewis Charles Harmer (1951)
- Lloyd James Austin (1967–1980)
- Peter Rickard (1980–1982)
- Terence Cave (elected but did not take the chair, 1985)
- Peter James Bayley (1985)
- Michael Moriarty (2011)
