= Terence Cave =

British literary scholar

Terence Christopher Cave CBE FBA (born 1 December 1938) is a British literary scholar.

== Life ==
Terence Cave studied for his Bachelor of Arts and Doctor of Philosophy degrees at Gonville and Caius College, Cambridge. Cave began his academic career in 1962 as an assistant lecturer at the University of St Andrews and went from there 1965 to the University of Warwick. Cave became Fellow and a Tutor in French at St John's College, Oxford, in 1972, and between 1989 and 2001 was also professor of French literature at the University of Oxford. In 1985 he was elected to become Drapers Professor of French at Cambridge, but remained at Oxford instead of taking the chair.

Among Cave's principal works are The Cornucopian Text (1979), Recognitions: A Study in Poetics (1988), and (edited with Sarah Kay and Malcolm Bowie) A Short History of French Literature (2003).

Cave is a member of the Academia Europaea (1990), fellow of the British Academy (1991), member of the Royal Norwegian Society of Sciences and Letters (1993), chevalier of the Ordre national du Mérite (2001), was made honorary doctor of the University of London in 2007, and is a member of the Norwegian Academy of Sciences. He gave the 2004 Master-Mind Lecture. In 2009 he received the Balzan Prize and in the 2013 Birthday Honours was appointed CBE. Cave has held positions as a guest professor at national and international universities.

== Works (selection) ==
- Devotional Poetry in France 1570-1613. Cambridge: University Press, 1969. ISBN 978-0-521-07145-1
- The Cornucopian Text: Problems of Writing in the French Renaissance. Oxford: Clarendon Press, 1979. ISBN 978-0-19-815835-6
- Cornucopia. Figures de l'abondance au XVIe siècle. Érasme, Rabelais, Ronsard, Montaigne. Ginette Morel in Romanian. Paris: Macula, 1997
- Recognitions: A Study in Poetics. Oxford: Clarendon Press, 1988
- Pré-histoires: textes troublés au seuil de la modernité. Geneva: Droz, 1999
- Pré-histoires II: langues étrangères et troubles économiques au XVIe siècle. Geneva: Droz, 2001
- How to Read Montaigne. London: Granta, 2007.
- With Sarah Kay and Malcolm Bowie: A Short History of French Literature, Oxford 2003
- Edited by Neil Kenny and Wes Williams: Retrospectives: Essays in Literature, Poetics and Cultural History. Oxford: Legenda, 2009.
- Mignon's Afterlives. Oxford University Press, Oxford 2011. ISBN 978-0-19-960480-7
- Thinking with Literature: Towards a Cognitive Criticism 2017
