= Mining Exchange =

Historical building in the UK

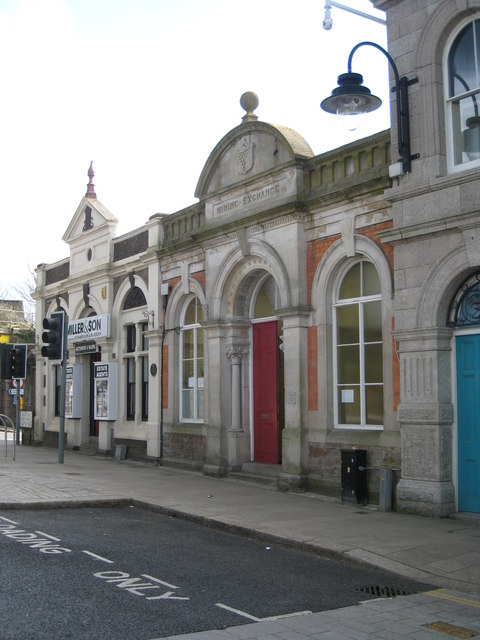

- Location within Cornwall
- 50.232833°N 5.227333°W
- Location: Alma Place, Redruth, Cornwall, England

Listed Building – Grade II
- Official name: Former mining exchange
- Designated: 12 September 1989
- Reference no.: 1161540

The Mining Exchange is a Grade II listed building in Redruth, Cornwall, UK. It was constructed in 1880 at a cost of £500 to build. It is thought to have been designed by local architect Sampson Hill. The Mining Exchange was where local producers sold mineral stock.
