= Northamptonshire Evening Telegraph =

- Type: Local newspaper
- Format: Tabloid
- Owner: National World
- Founded: 1897
- Language: English
- Headquarters: Newspaper House, Ise Park, Rothwell Road, Kettering, Northamptonshire NN16 8GA
- Circulation: 4,383 (as of 2023)
- Website: northantstelegraph.co.uk

The Northamptonshire Evening Telegraph is the local newspaper for north and east Northamptonshire and is the sister paper of Northampton's Chronicle & Echo. It is based at Newspaper House in Rothwell Road, Kettering, and has since 1996 been part of the Johnston Press newspaper group. The paper also has district offices in Wellingborough, Rushden and Corby.

The Northamptonshire Evening Telegraph is published in full colour every Thursday. Two editions of the paper are printed—one distributed in Corby and the other in Kettering, Wellingborough, Rushden and the surrounding areas. In spring 2012 a decision was made by the newspaper's owners that the newspaper would become a weekly publication, along with several other local newspapers.

The paper has been published continuously since 4 October 1897. A sports edition, the Football Telegraph, was also published until 1914 and again from 1921 to 1939.

== History and ownership ==
The East Midland Allied Press was formed in 1947 by merger of the Northamptonshire Printing and Publishing Company with the Peterborough Advertiser Company, the West Norfolk and King's Lynn Newspaper Company and commercial printing sections at Rushden, King's Lynn and Bury St. Edmunds. It was overseen by Pat Winfrey, the son of Sir Richard Winfrey, who had bought the Spalding Guardian in 1887. After 49 years, EMAP divested 69 newspapers including Northamptonshire Newspapers to Johnston Press in 1996. JPIMedia (formerly Johnston Press) and its subsidiaries were acquired by National World in 2021.

The Peterborough Evening Telegraph began as localised edition with four change pages in 1948. Between 1946 and 1976, four geographically distinct editions were published with up to three change pages. From 1988, the Kettering, Corby and Wellingborough editions were recommenced with minor page changes.

== Campaigns and major stories ==
- The Evening Telegraph's fundraising campaign for 2008 is to raise £20,000 for the Warwickshire and Northamptonshire Air Ambulance.
- Schoolgirl singer Faryl Smith's career has been followed closely since she was seven years old. The ET even launched a campaign for Faryl to win Britain's Got Talent in May 2008.
- On 18 November 2008 the paper covered a story of more than 60 people from Eastern Europe who had been trafficked illegally into the country and had been rescued by Northamptonshire Police.
- First World War roll of honour - a list of all the people from the region who died during the Great War.
- Get Active campaign - a campaign to get 20,000 people in Northamptonshire exercising to win the region £1m for sporting facilities.
- Campaigns for Jenna Mae Tokens, 7, and Chelsea Knighton, 3, both battling childhood cancer.
- Have a Heart appeal - an appeal to raise £100,000 for a new Heart Unit at Kettering General Hospital.
- University Campaign to get a campus in the north of the county. This has not been supported in Corby as the article clearly indicates. The Corby residents wish to have their own bid considered.
