= Andrew Bowie (philosopher) =

British philosopher and professor

- Born: Andrew S. Bowie; 1952 (age 73–74)

Academic background
- Education: University of East Anglia (PhD)
- Thesis: Problems of Historical Understanding in the Modern Novel (1979)

Academic work
- Discipline: Philosophy
- Institutions: Royal Holloway, University of London

Andrew S. Bowie (born 1952) is a British philosopher who is Professor of Philosophy and German at Royal Holloway, University of London and Founding Director of the Humanities and Arts Research Centre (HARC). His elder brother, Angus, is a classicist.

== Life and works ==
He did his doctoral research on "Problems of Historical Understanding in the Modern Novel" (1979) at the University of East Anglia, where he was taught by the renowned German writer and scholar W. G. Sebald (who later cited Bowie's work on Alexander Kluge in his Campo Santo). He studied German philosophy at the Free University of Berlin. He was Professor of Philosophy at Anglia Ruskin University until 1999. He was also Alexander von Humboldt Research Fellow at the Philosophy department of University of Tübingen. He is on the Advisory Council for the Institute of Philosophy, University of London.

He has worked to promote a better understanding of German philosophy in the Anglophone analytical tradition - including the works of Johann Georg Hamann, Johann Gottfried von Herder, Immanuel Kant, Johann Gottlieb Fichte, Georg Wilhelm Friedrich Hegel, Novalis (Friedrich von Hardenberg), Friedrich Wilhelm Joseph Schelling, Karl Wilhelm Friedrich Schlegel, Karl Marx, Friedrich Nietzsche, Walter Benjamin, Martin Heidegger, Hans-Georg Gadamer, Theodor W. Adorno, Jürgen Habermas, Albrecht Wellmer and Manfred Frank.

Frank and Habermas have spoken highly of his work in this area - with Habermas calling his work "masterly" and Frank calling him an "exceptional scholar", whose work represents "the most knowledgeable presentation in English of the history of the German contribution to so-called continental philosophy". The philosopher Charles Taylor has described his work on music as "excellent and densely argued".

He has translated the works of Friedrich Wilhelm Joseph Schelling and Friedrich Schleiermacher. His recent work has focused on music and philosophy, and Adorno on the nature of philosophy. In addition to his philosophical work on music, he is a keen jazz saxophonist and has played with leading contemporary jazz musicians such as Al Casey and Humphrey Lyttelton.

== Bibliography ==
- Schelling and Modern European Philosophy: An Introduction (1993)
- From Romanticism to Critical Theory (1997)
- Schleiermacher: 'Hermeneutics and Criticism' and Other Writings (ed) (1998)
- Aesthetics and Subjectivity: From Kant to Nietzsche (2nd edition, 2003)
- Introduction to German Philosophy: From Kant to Habermas (2003)
- Music, Philosophy, and Modernity (2009)
- Philosophical Variations: Music as 'philosophical Language' (2010)
- German Philosophy: A Very Short Introduction (2010)
- Adorno and the Ends of Philosophy (2013)
- Aesthetic Dimensions of Modern Philosophy (2022)
- Theodor W. Adorno: A Very Short Introduction (2022)
