= Michael Moriarty (historian) =

British historian

Michael Moriarty FBA is a British historian of French and French literature, currently the Drapers Professor at University of Cambridge and also fellow of the British Academy.
