= Odette de Mourgues =

Odette de Mourgues (1914–1988) was a noted Cambridge based literary scholar. The early inspiration for her work was Henri Fluchere but at the University of Cambridge it was F. R. Leavis.

== Selected publications ==
- de Mourgues, O. (1953). Metaphysical Baroque and Précieux Poetry, by Odette de Mourgues,... Clarendon Press.
- de Mourgues, O. (1967). Autonomie de Racine. FeniXX.
