= Redruth =

Town and civil parish in Cornwall, England

Coordinates: 50°13′58″N 05°13′35″W

Redruth: Cornish: Resrudh
- Town and civil parish
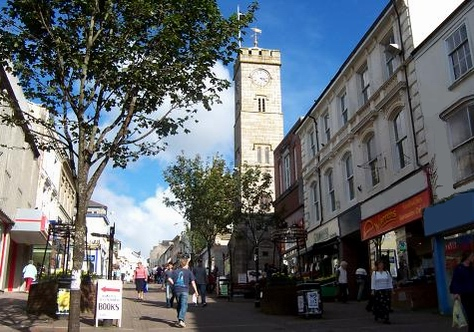
- Fore Street, Redruth town centre

- Location within Cornwall
- Interactive map of Redruth
- Population: 15,626 (Parish, 2021) (Note: To get individual parish data, use the query function on table PP002.); 15,455 (Built up area, 2021)
- OS grid reference: SW699420
- Civil parish: Redruth
- Unitary authority: Cornwall
- Ceremonial county: Cornwall
- Region: South West
- Country: England
- Sovereign state: United Kingdom
- Post town: REDRUTH
- Postcode district: TR15
- Dialling code: 01209
- Police: Devon and Cornwall
- Fire: Cornwall
- Ambulance: South Western
- UK Parliament: Camborne and Redruth
- Website: www.discoverredruth.co.uk

Redruth (/rəˈdruːθ/ rə-DROOTH, Cornish: Resrudh [ˈrɛzryːð], meaning red ford) is a town and civil parish in Cornwall, England. It lies approximately 9 miles (14 km) west of Truro, 12 miles (19 km) east of St Ives, 18 miles (29 km) north-east of Penzance and 11 miles (18 km) north-west of Falmouth. At the 2021 census, the population of the parish was 15,626 and the population of the built-up area was 15,455.

== Toponymy ==
The form Unyredruth (Euny being the patron saint) is recorded in 1563. Earlier forms are Ridruthe (1259), Rudruth (1283) and Riddruth (1291).

The name Redruth derives from its older Cornish name, Rhyd-ruth, meaning 'red ford' — literally 'ford-red': the first syllable rhyd means 'ford'; the second ruth means 'red'. It is therefore the -ruth and not the red- part of the name which means the colour red.

Rhyd is the older form of res, which is a Cornish equivalent to a ford (across a river), a common Celtic word: Old Cornish rid, Welsh rhyd (Old Welsh rit), Old Breton rit or ret, Gaulish ritu-, all from Indo-European *prtus derived word in *-tu from the root *per, 'to cross, to go through', Proto-Germanic *furdúz (English ford, German Furt), Latin portus, all cognate to the Celtic word.

Béroul's Roman de Tristan features a location in Cornwall called Crois Rouge in Norman French, 'red cross' in English.

== History ==
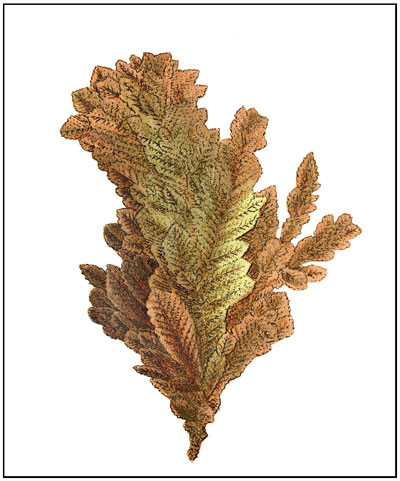
Native Copper mineral specimen from Huelvor, near Redruth; hand-coloured copper plate engraving by James Sowerby, 1807

Traditionally in the Penwith Hundred, the town has developed away from the original settlement, which was near where the present Churchtown (around St. Euny's Church) district of Redruth stands today. This location is a steeply wooded valley, with Carn Brea on one side and the now-called Bullers Hill on the other. The presence of shallow lodes of tin and copper, lying east to west, made it an advantageous site for extracting metals, including tin, lead and copper. The first settlers stayed by a crossing in the river and started extracting metal ores; this process turned the colour of the river red.

Redruth was connected to the electric telegraph network in 1863, when the Electric and International Telegraph Company opened stations at Truro, Redruth, Penzance, Camborne, Liskard and St Austell.

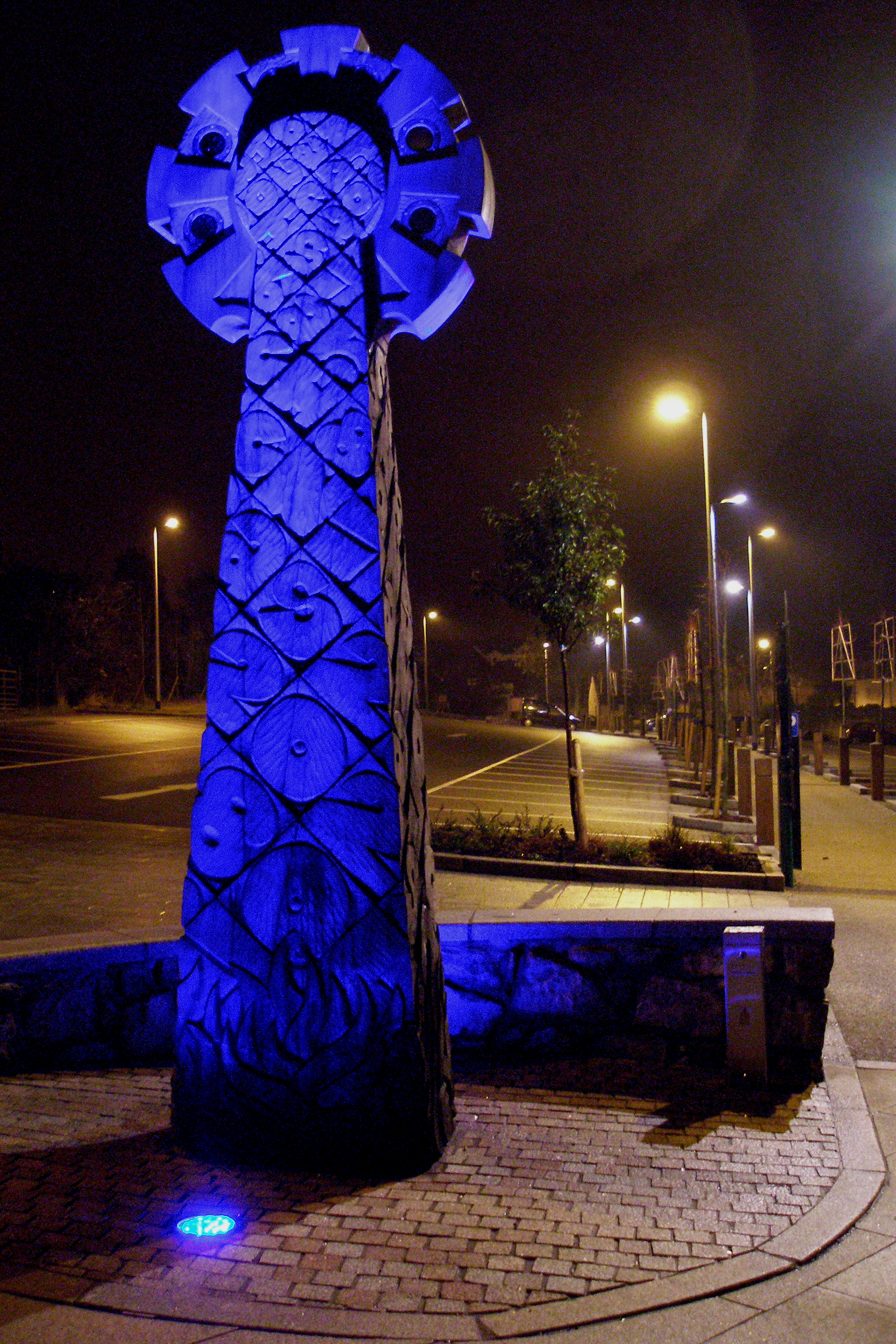
Celtic wooden cross in New Cut car park

In the 1880s and 1890s, the town end of Clinton Road gained a number of institutions, notably a School of Mines and Art School in 1882–83, St. Andrew's Church (replacing the chapel in Chapel Street) in 1883 and, opposite, the Free Library, built in 1895. The Mining Exchange was built in 1880 as a place for the trading of mineral stock.

By the end of the 19th century, the Cornish mining industry was in decline and Britain was importing most of its copper ore. To find employment, many miners emigrated to the newer mining industries in the Americas, Pachuca, Mexico, Australasia and South Africa. By the turn of the 20th century, Victoria Park had been laid out to commemorate the Golden Jubilee and this part of town had taken on its present appearance; this was a far cry from the jumble of mining activity that had taken place there in the early 19th century. Redruth was making its transition from a market town dominated by mines and industry to a residential centre. Cornwall's last fully operational mine, South Crofty at Pool between Redruth and Camborne, closed in March 1998.

== Geography ==
Redruth forms the eastern part of a loose conurbation which stretches to Camborne, 3 miles (4.8 km) to the west. At the 2011 census, the Office for National Statistics (ONS) defined what it called the Redruth built-up area, which extended to Camborne and had a population of 42,690, making it the largest built-up area in Cornwall. Cornwall Council similarly defined what it called Camborne/Pool/Redruth, which had a population of 55,400 in 2011. Following a change in methodology for the 2021 census, Redruth is now considered a separate built-up area by the ONS, with a population of 15,455.

On 7 November 2007, Redruth won an annual UK town centre environment award jointly with Luton, which is run by the BCSC. (Note: BCSC is a retail property consortium.) The judges praised the cast bronze dogs and also liked the large amount of work that had been done to the town in terms of landscaping the central area. (Note: Mainly Fore Street and the opes (alleys).)

== Governance ==
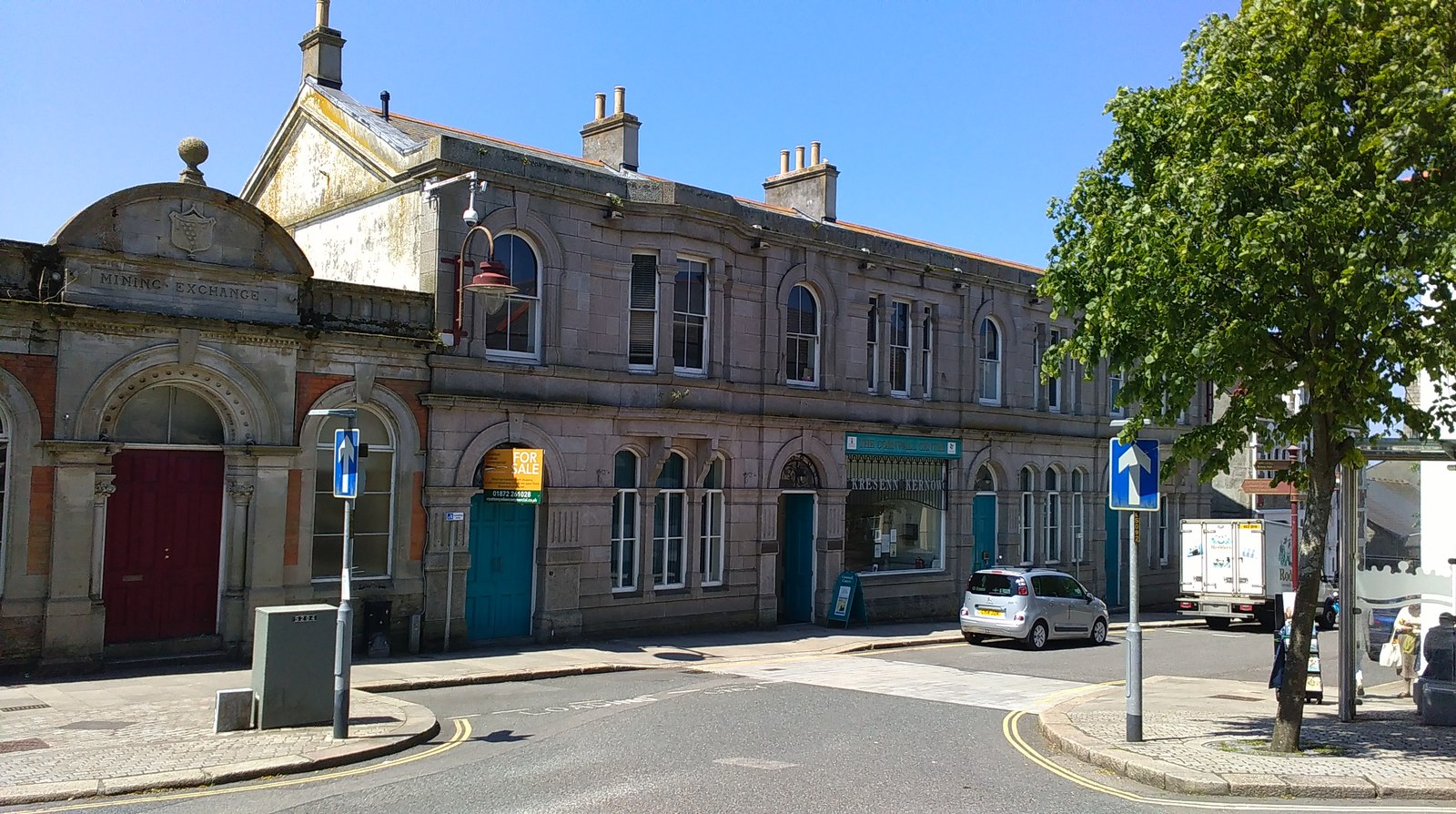
The Civic Centre, on Alma Place, houses the library and the town council's headquarters

There are two tiers of local government covering Redruth, at parish (town) and unitary authority level: Redruth Town Council and Cornwall Council. The former is based at the Civic Centre, which was completed in 1880; it was originally the Redruth District Bank and the town's main post office.

Since the 2010 general election, the town has formed part of the Camborne and Redruth parliamentary constituency. The seat was won at the 2024 general election by Perran Moon of the Labour Party.

=== Administrative history ===
Redruth was an ancient parish in the Penwith Hundred of Cornwall. In 1837, the Redruth poor law union was created, grouping several parishes around Redruth together for the purposes of administering their responsibilities under the poor laws. They built a workhouse just west of Redruth in 1838, which eventually became the Camborne Redruth Community Hospital.

In 1853, the parish of Redruth was made a local board district, administered by an elected local board. Such local board districts were reconstituted as urban districts under the Local Government Act 1894. The 1894 Act also established rural districts based on the poor law unions; the parts of the Redruth poor law union that were not included in urban districts became the Redruth Rural District.

Redruth Urban District Council established its headquarters in a former bank at 2 Station Hill, remaining there until the council's abolition. Redruth Urban District was abolished in 1934. The area was then merged with the abolished urban district of Camborne, the parish of Illogan, and parts of the parishes of Gwennap and Wendron to become the new Camborne–Redruth Urban District. Camborne-Redruth Urban District Council based itself in Camborne.

Camborne–Redruth Urban District was abolished in 1974 under the Local Government Act 1972, when the area became part of the Kerrier district.

The area of the pre-1974 Camborne-Redruth Urban District became an unparished area at the time of the 1974 reforms. Eight new civil parishes were subsequently created in 1985, covering the area of the former urban district, including one called Redruth. The new parish council adopted the name Redruth Town Council.

Kerrier district was in turn abolished in 2009; Cornwall County Council then took on district-level functions, making it a unitary authority and was renamed Cornwall Council.

== Education ==
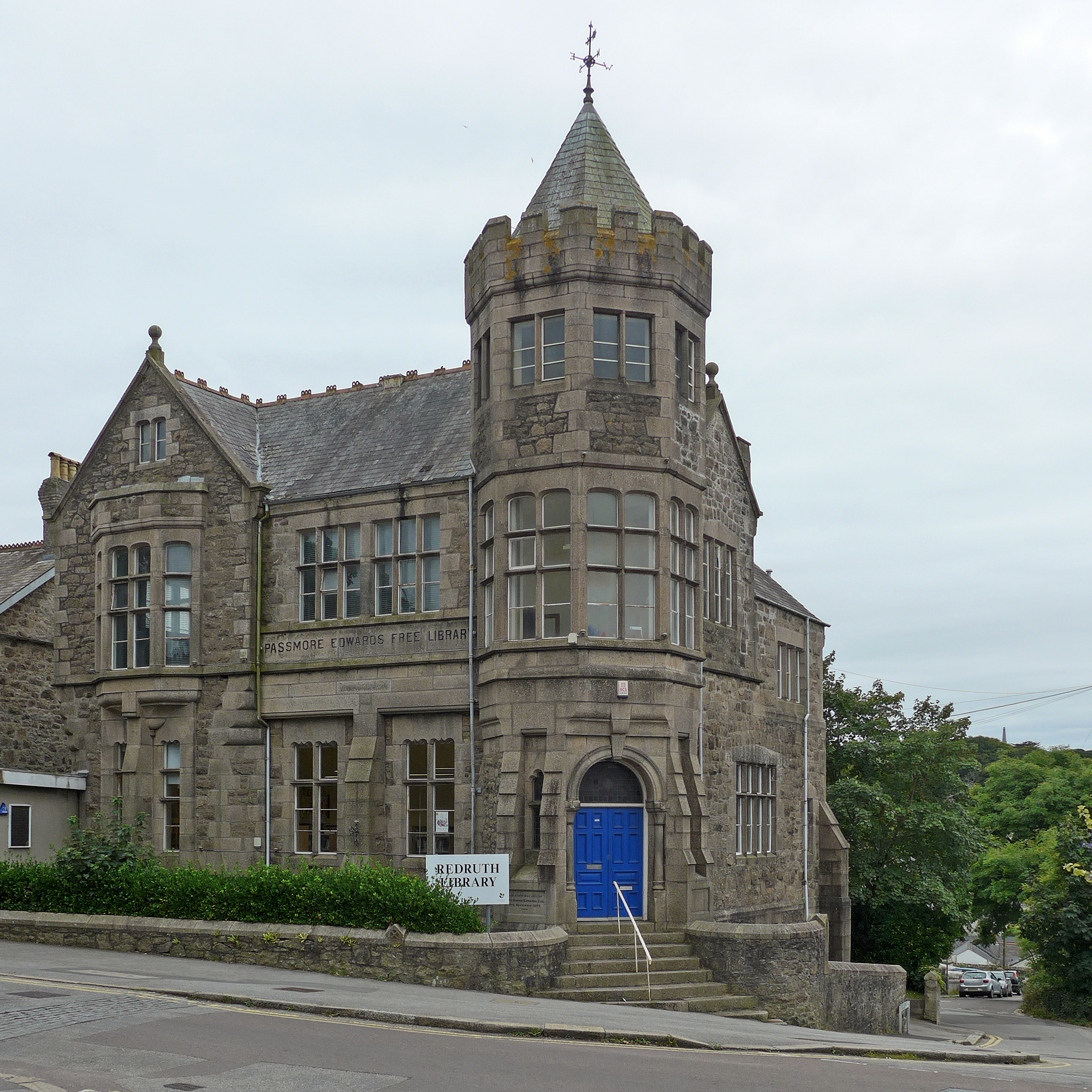
The Passmore Edwards Building, Clinton Road; formerly the town's library

Redruth School, a Technology College, is a secondary school for ages 11–16. It used to have a sixth form, for students aged 16 to 18; however, it stopped applications for new students in 2016 and closed in 2020, due to funding cuts. The town used to have a co-educational independent school, Highfields Private School, but it closed in 2012.

Primary schools within the town include Pennoweth School, Treleigh School, Treloweth Community Primary School, Trewirgie Infant School and Trewirgie Junior School. The Curnow Community Special School caters for students with special needs.

The Passmore Edwards Free Library was built in 1894. Its architect was James Hicks, who used a castellated baronial style; there is a prominent octagonal tower. The reading room was once the school of Thomas Collins, where Collins, who had been headmaster of Trewirgie School, taught local children and the children left behind by parents who had emigrated overseas. The former School of Science and Art is also the work of James Hicks; the later additions were built for the School of Mines.

== Notable buildings ==
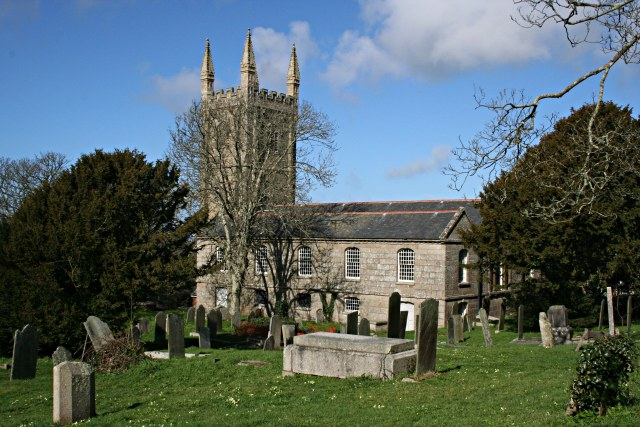
St Uny's Church

The Parish Church of St Uny, which is some distance from the town centre, is of Norman foundation but was rebuilt in 1756; it is grade II* listed. The patron saint is also honoured at Lelant. The tower is two centuries earlier and the whole church is built of granite. A chapel of ease was built in the town in 1828, but it is no longer in use. The parish of St Euny is part of a group ministry with the parishes of Pencoys, Lanner and Treleigh. Other places of worship include the Wesleyan Church of 1826, the Free Methodist Church of 1864 (in grand Italianate style) and the Quaker Meeting House of 1833 (no longer in use).

The Mining Exchange building was used as a housing advice centre; it was built in 1880 as accommodation for share brokers.

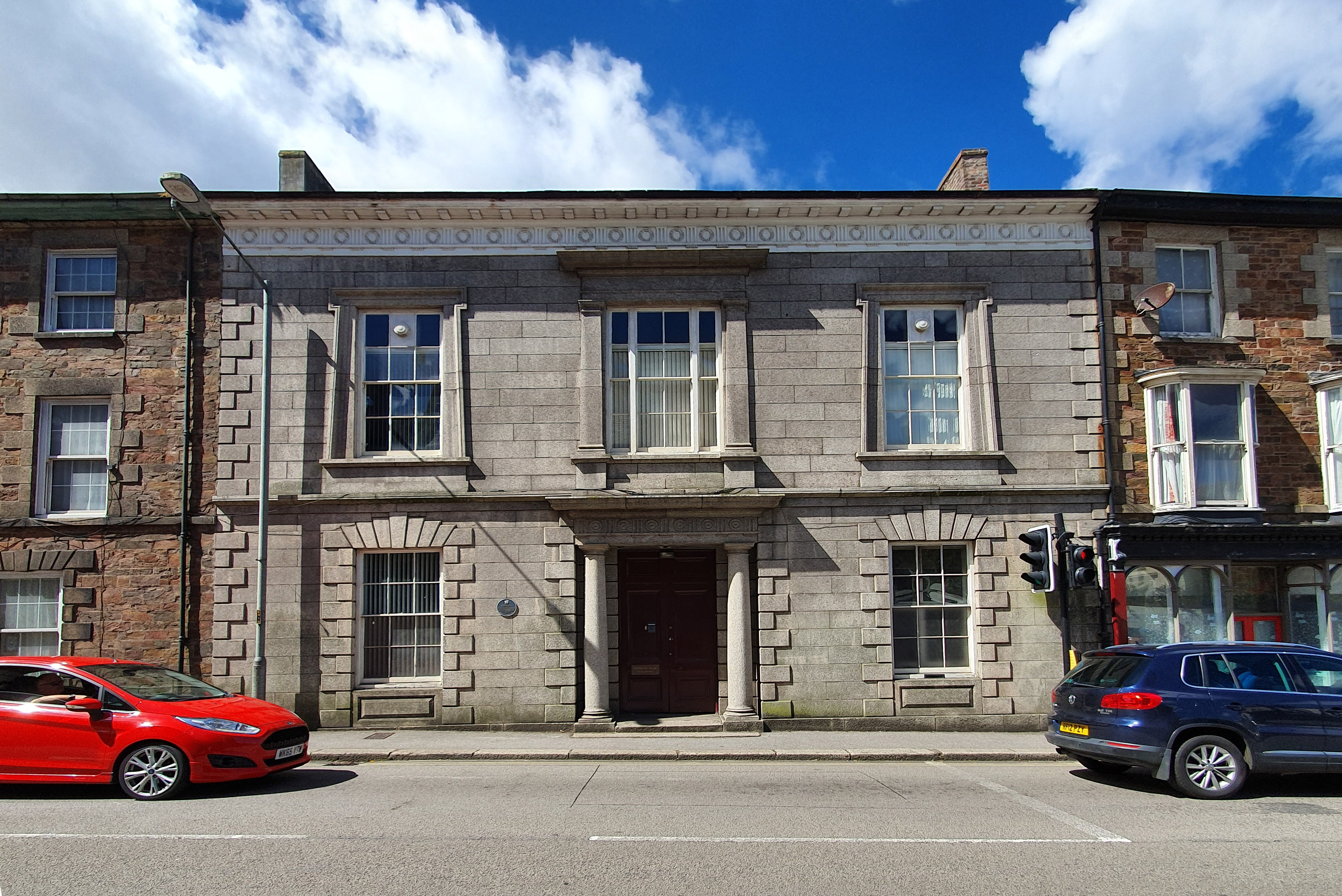
The Old Courthouse

The Old Courthouse was completed in 1850 and served the town until 1977; it later became offices for the solicitor who acted as clerk to the Redruth Rural District Council.

=== Murdoch House ===
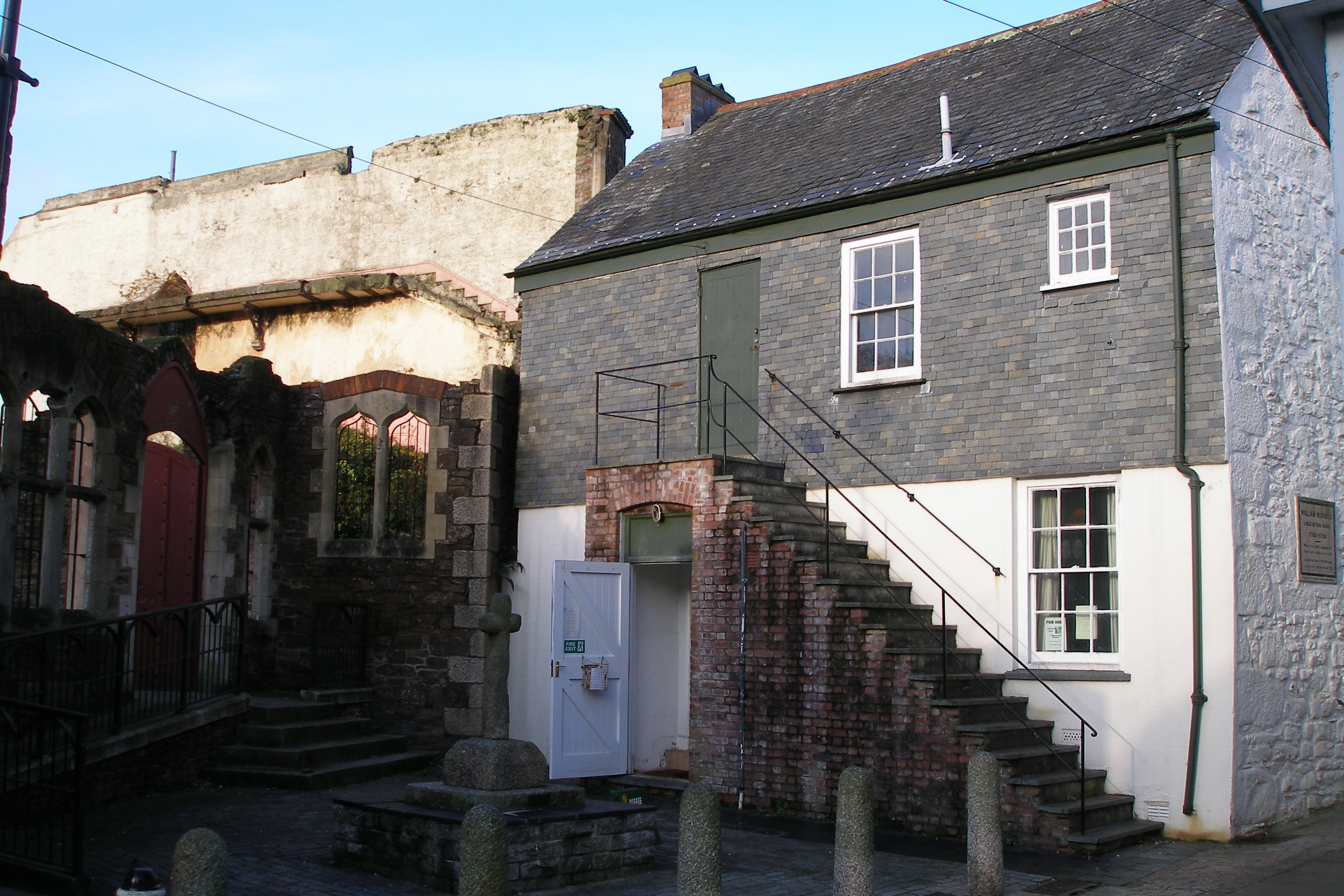
Murdoch House and St Rumon's Gardens

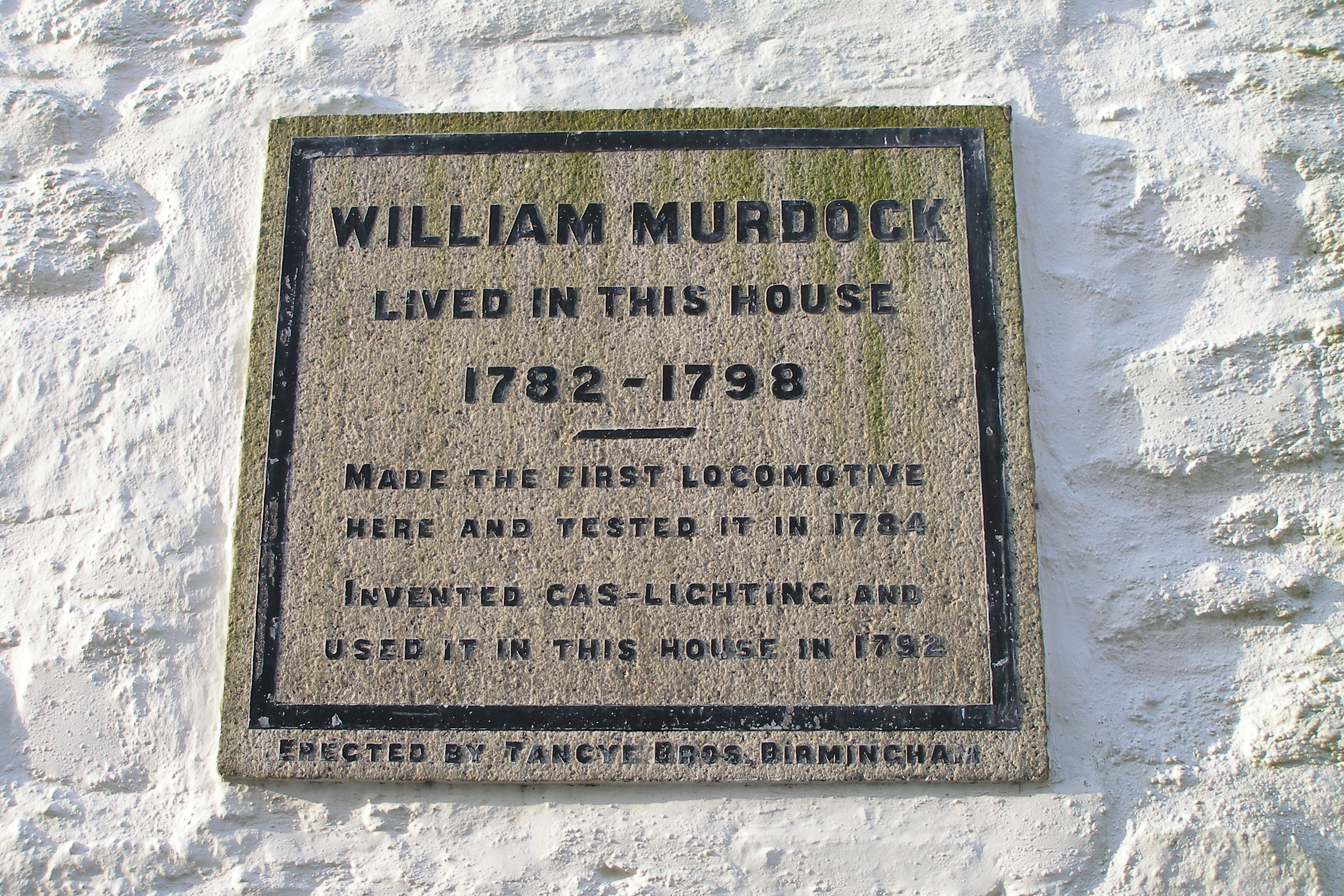
Plaque on Murdoch House

The house now called Murdoch House (Note: It is sometimes spelled Murdock.) in the middle of Cross Street was erected in the 1660s as a chapel and it later became a prison. William Murdoch lived in it from 1782 to 1798; during this time, he worked on local tin and copper mines, erecting engines on behalf of Boulton and Watt. He fitted the house out with gas lighting from coal gas; this was the first house in the world with this type of lighting.

In the 19th century, the house was used as a tea room, run by a Mrs Knuckey. In 1931, Mr A. Pearce Jenkin, a leading citizen of Redruth, purchased the house and gave it as a gift to the Society of Friends (Quakers). Murdoch House has since been fully restored and is now regularly used by the Redruth Old Cornwall Society, as well as the Cornish-American Connection and the Redruth Story Group. St Rumon's Gardens is next door.

=== Kresen Kernow ===
Kresen Kernow, on the site of Redruth Brewery, houses the archives and collections of the former Cornwall Records Office and Cornish Studies Library. It also holds the Cornwall Tapestries, (Note: The work of the Tregellas Foundation.) which depict the history of Cornwall in embroidery.

=== Tin Miner Statue ===
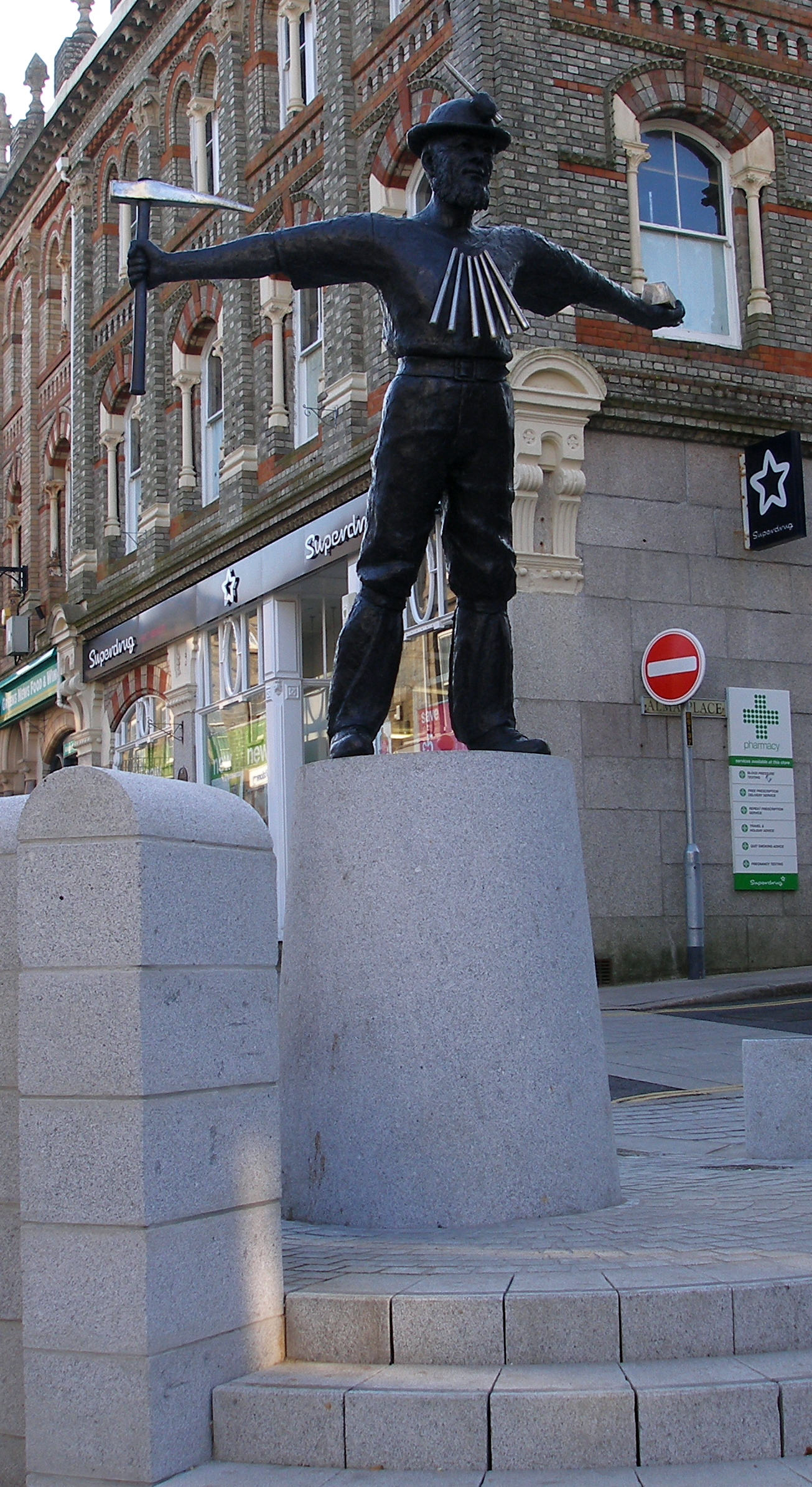
Tin Miner statue

A bronze sculpture of a Cornish miner by artist David Annand, standing at 6 feet 7 inches, was erected in April 2008. The sculpture was commissioned by the Redruth Public Realm Working Party's Mining Art Group, in response to comments received during the consultation process that the town did not have anything to represent the history of the men who worked down the tin and copper mines in the area.

=== Street landscaping ===
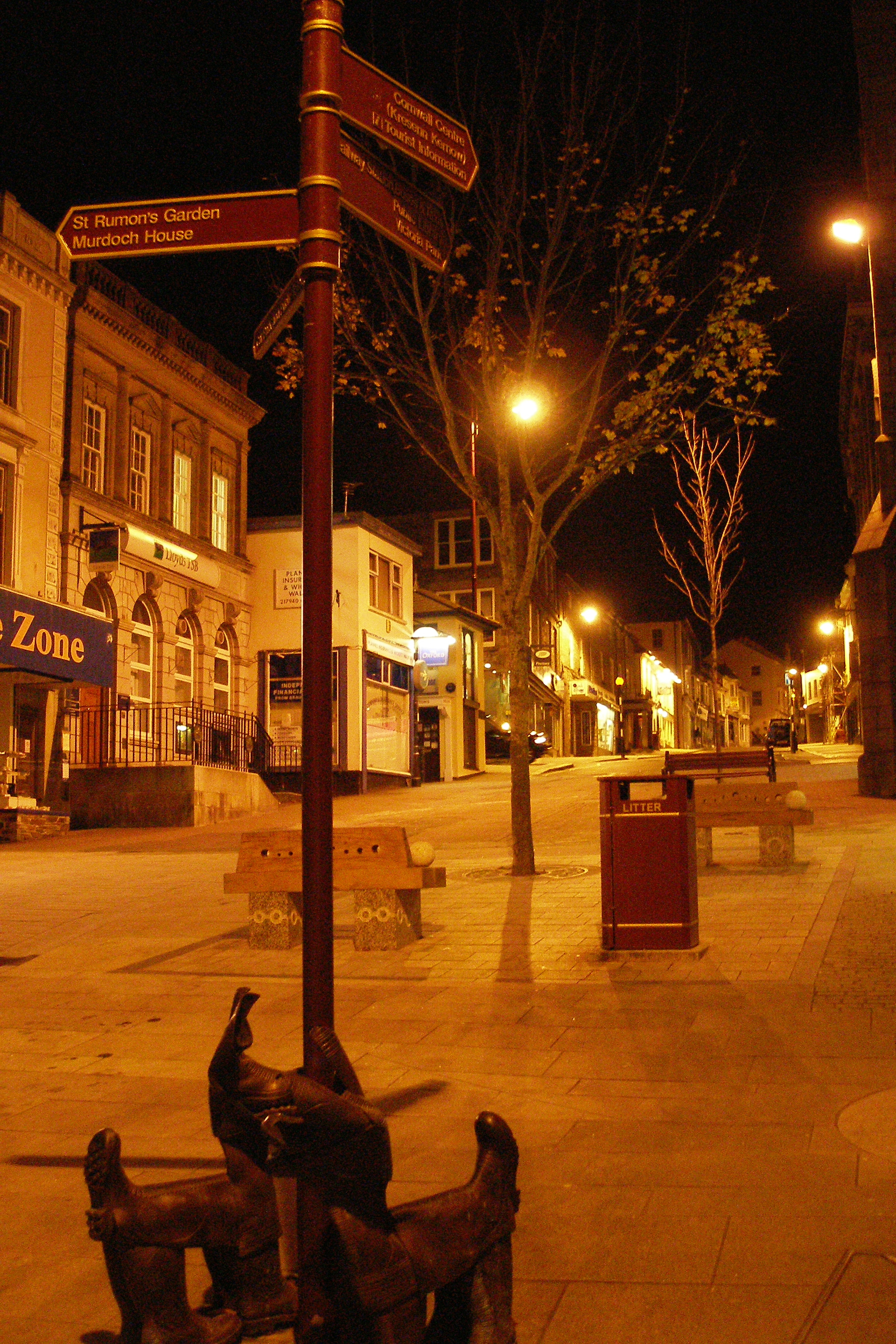
Fore Street at night, showing one of the groups of bronze dogs

Street landscaping in Redruth includes wooden seating, with granite furniture, signposts, street lights and litter bins. Two sets of bronze dogs were cast from the boots of former tin miners by sculptor David Kemp. The town has a burgundy colour theme, which is in the public realm regeneration work to highlight the town's name. Several public buildings have been lit with LED coloured lights, including opposite the railway station and St Rumon's Gardens.

== Amenities ==
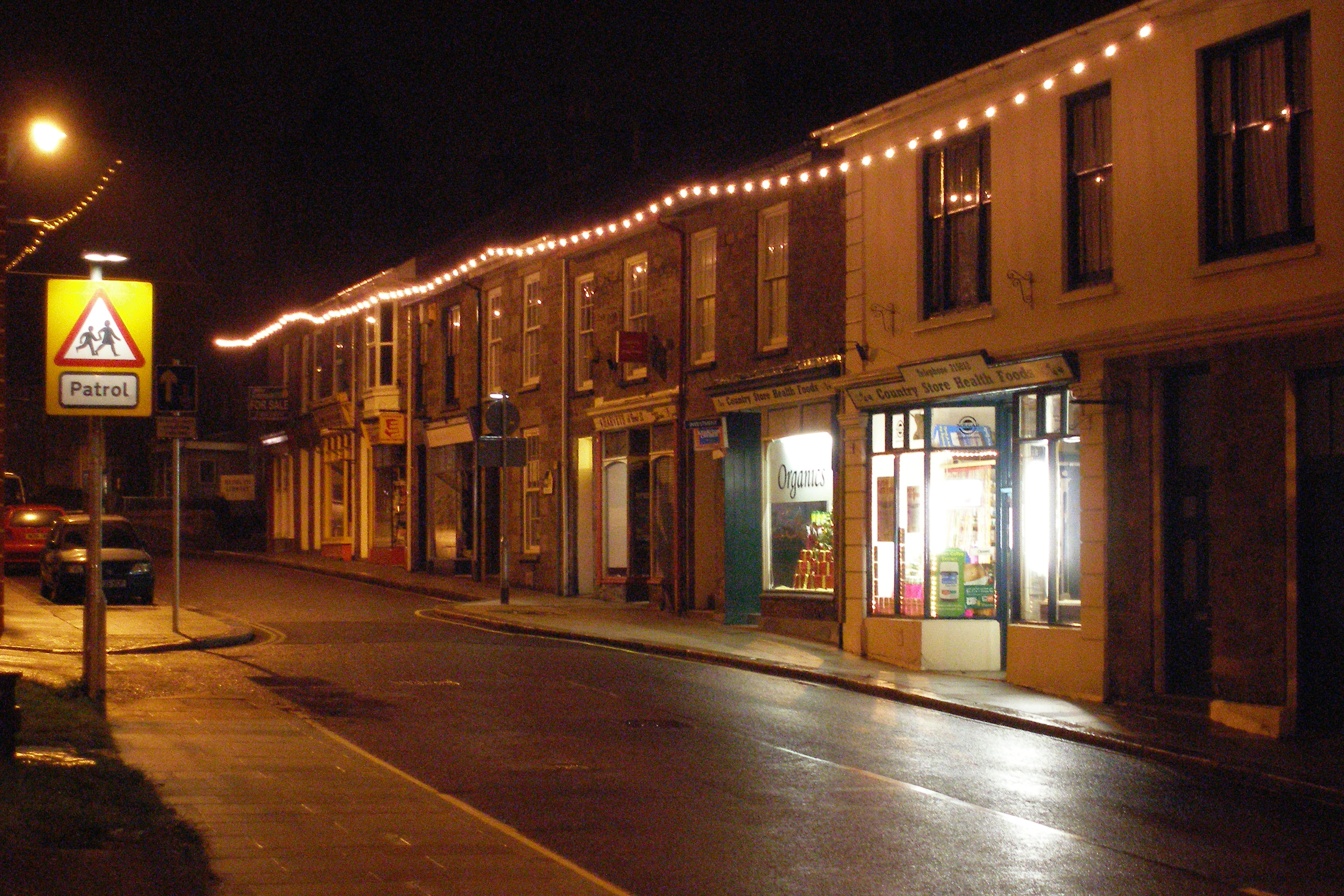
Bond Street, one of the two specialist shopping areas

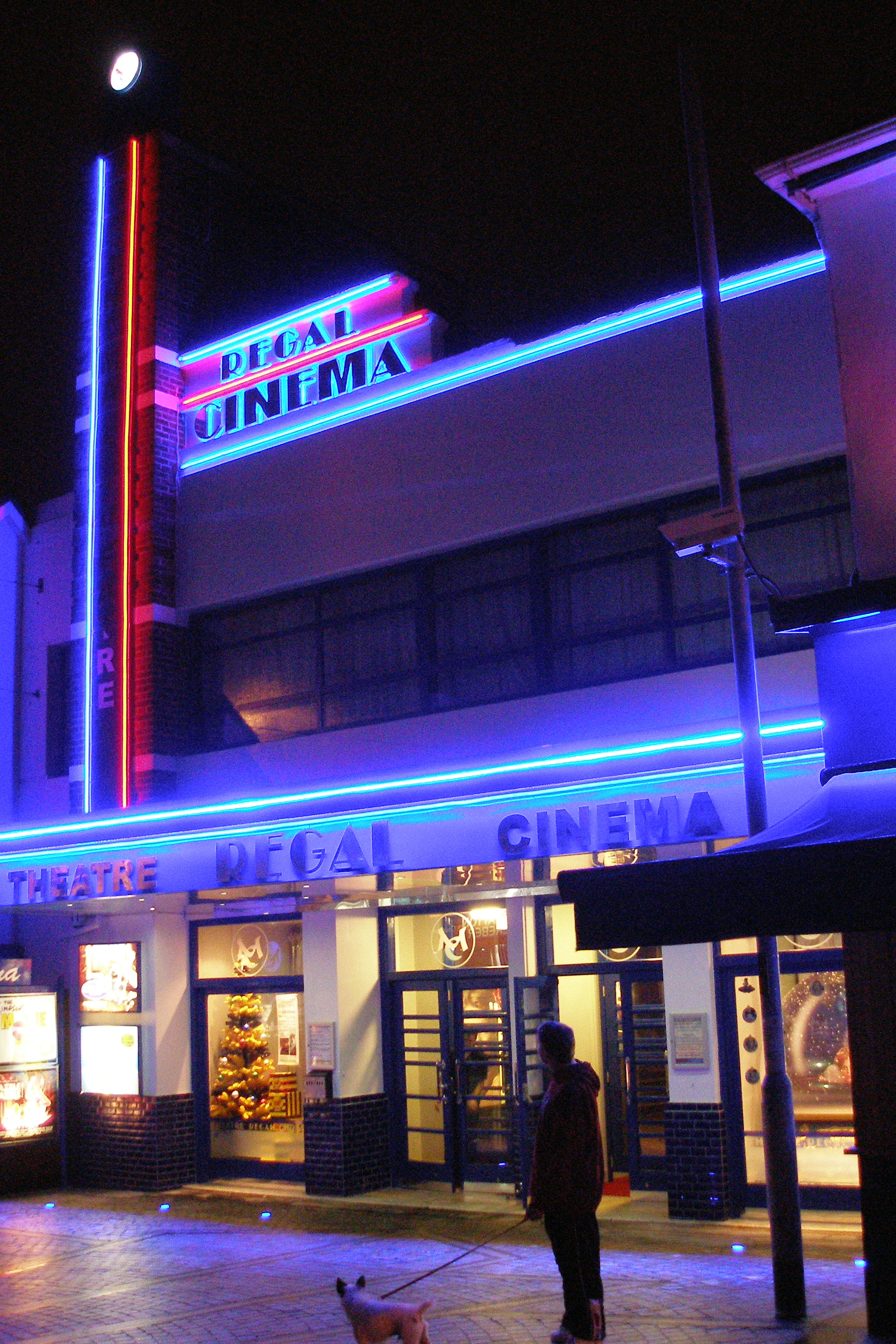
The Regal Cinema

Amenities within the town centre include a multi-screen cinema, a covered market way, an old butter market, several antique shops, a second-hand bookshop and two supermarkets. On Fore Street, there are two separate specialist shopping areas: Bond Street (Note: To the south of the railway station.) and Green Lane to the north.

On 20 June 2008, the town held its first regular farmers' market in Market Place; it was planned to be held subsequently every Friday.

Just outside the town is a visitor attraction, themed on the Robinson Shaft Mine, it offers parking, an adventure playground for older children and a restaurant. At times, the last working Cornish pumping engine can be seen working. The museum is an anchor point on the European Route of Industrial Heritage.

A museum organised by the Old Cornwall Society is housed in the town council office at the bottom of the main street.

== Transport ==
=== Railway ===
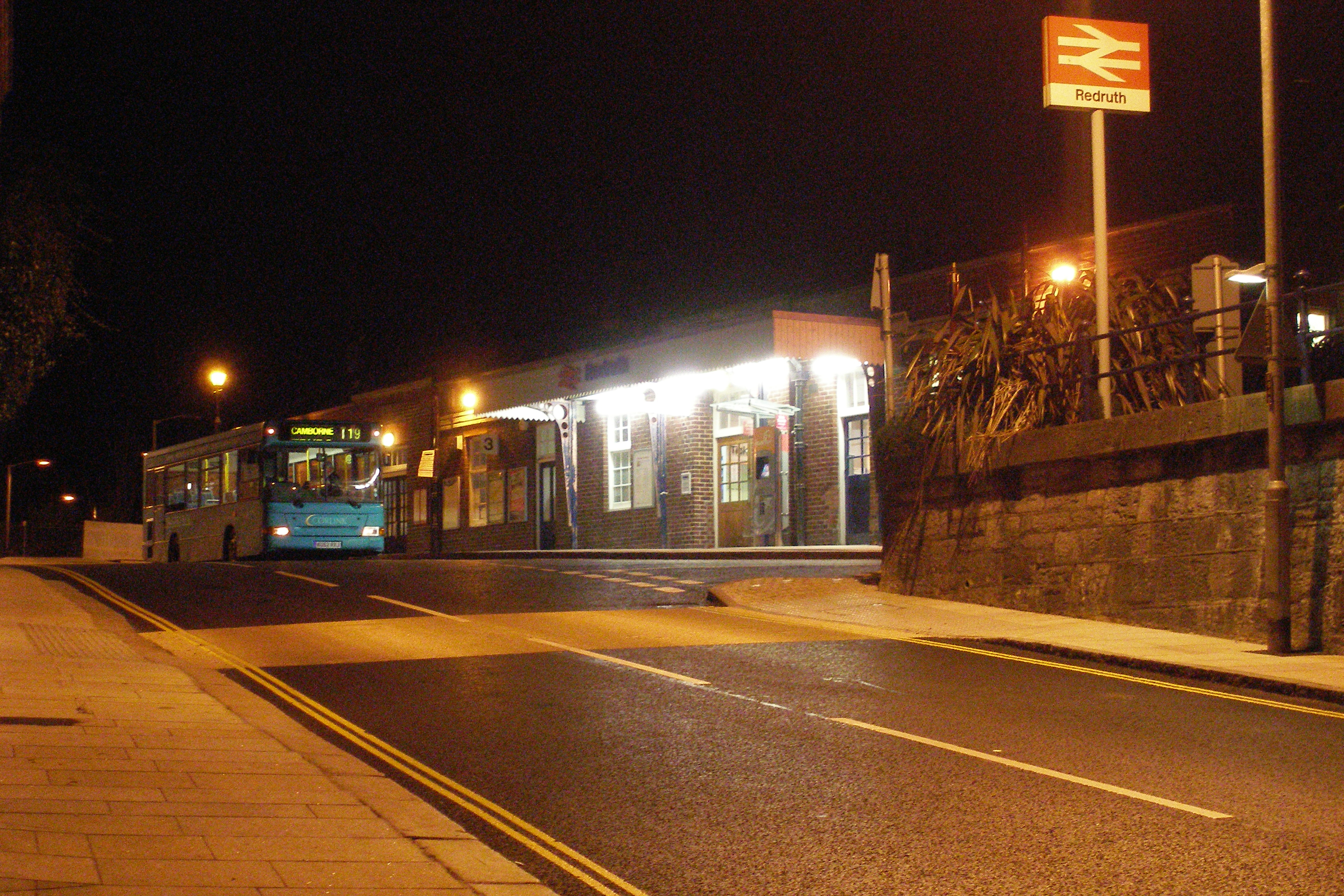
The main station building

Redruth railway station lies on the Cornish Main Line; it is a railhead for both Helston and the Lizard. It is served by two train operating companies:

- Great Western Railway operates regular inter-city services between London Paddington, Exeter St Davids, Plymouth and Penzance
- CrossCountry operates a small number of services each day between Edinburgh Waverley, Birmingham New Street, Bristol Temple Meads and Penzance.

=== Buses ===
Local bus services are operated predominantly by Go Cornwall Bus; routes connect the town with Camborne, Falmouth, St Ives and Truro.

=== Roads ===
Redruth lies on the route of the main A30 road routes to Penwith, North Cornwall, South East Cornwall and Plymouth. Another road, the A393, bisects the town in a north–south direction, and links the A30 with the port of Falmouth. A third road, the A3047, links Redruth with Camborne, 4 miles (6.4 km) to the west.

== Sport ==
Redruth Rugby Football Club currently plays in National League 2 South. (Note: Tier four of rugby union in England.) Players such as Phil Vickery, Rob Thirlby and Richard Sharp have played for the club.

Redruth Cricket Club currently consists of four men's playing XIs, one women's XI and multiple youth sides. Redruth First XI plays in the Cornwall Cricket League ECB Premier League, coming second in the 2019 season. The Second XI was placed second in County League One, the second division of Cornish cricket, in the same year.

Redruth football club has not enjoyed as much success, but still thrives in its regular fixtures.

Duchy Hockey Club are based at Pool Academy, on the outskirts of Redruth, and competes in the West of England regional leagues.

Redruth was a major centre for Cornish wrestling for many centuries. The ancient traditional location for tournaments was at Plain-an-Gwarry; many other venues started to be used in the 1800s onwards, such as South Turnpike and the Recreation Ground. In 1887, the town hosted two challenge matches for the world title at the recreation ground and the Championship of World in 1889.

== Notable people ==
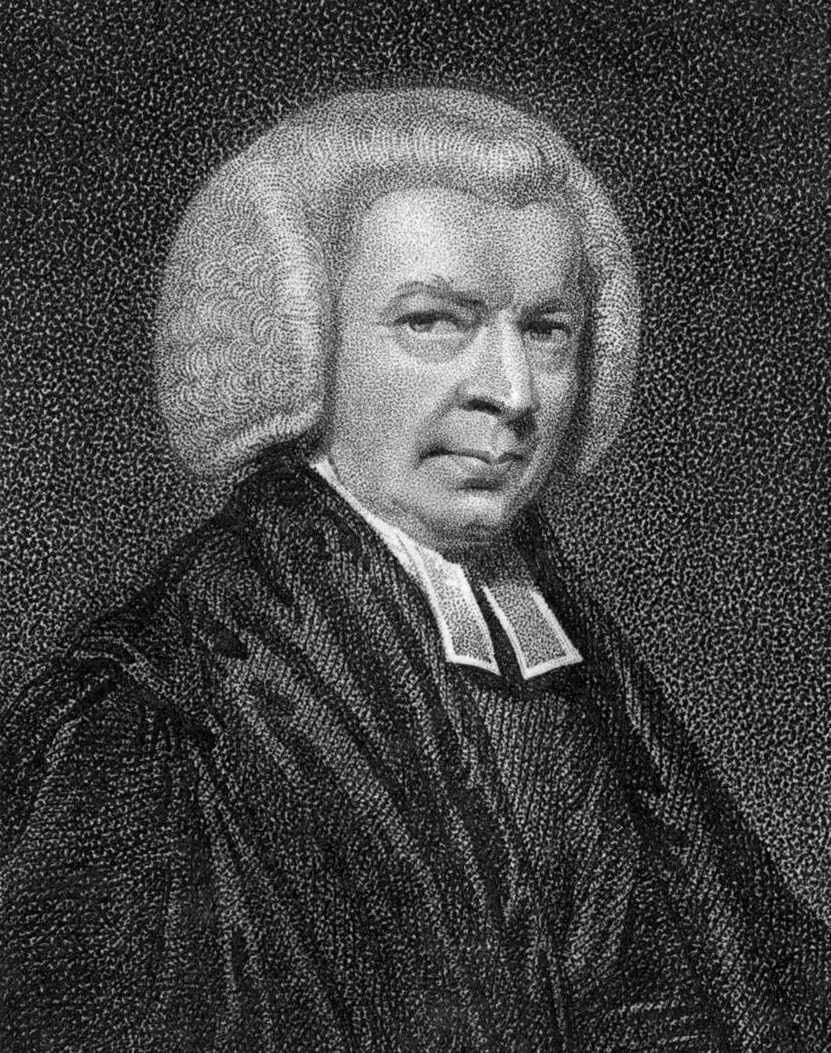
Thomas Haweis

- Thomas Haweis (c.1734–1820), a Church of England cleric and a leading figure of the 18th century evangelical revival
- William Pryce (1735–1790), medical man, antiquary, promoted the Cornish language and mining.
- Henry Roach (1808–1889), a miner, captain of the Burra mine in South Australia from 1847 to 1867.
- John Gray (1817–??), member of the Wisconsin State Assembly
- John Passmore Edwards (1823–1911), Victorian philanthropist and journalist; born in nearby Blackwater
- Harriet Carne (1831–1931), Canadian businesswoman, philanthropist, centenarian, born in Redruth
- Nicholas Trestrail (1858–1922), mining engineer who designed Harvey's Engine, a Cornish beam engine
- Fanny Moody (1866–1945), soprano, known as The Cornish Nightingale
- Sidney Toy (1875–1967), architect and architectural historian
- Hilda Moody (1876–1961), soprano and actress
- Harold Hayman (1894–1966), politician, MP for Falmouth and Camborne, 1950-1966.
- E. Florence Whitlock (1889–1978), composer and conductor
- A. K. Hamilton Jenkin (1900–1980), a Cornish bard and historian
- Svetlana Alliluyeva (1926–2011), daughter of Soviet leader Joseph Stalin
- Charles Thomas (1928–2016), historian and archaeologist
- David Menhennet (1928–2016), former librarian of the House of Commons Library
- Ann Trevenen Jenkin (1930–2024), writer, librarian and activist for Cornish independence
- D. M. Thomas (born 1935), poet, novelist, translator, biographer and playwright.
- Peter Bayley (1944–2018), scholar of French literature, born and educated in Redruth.

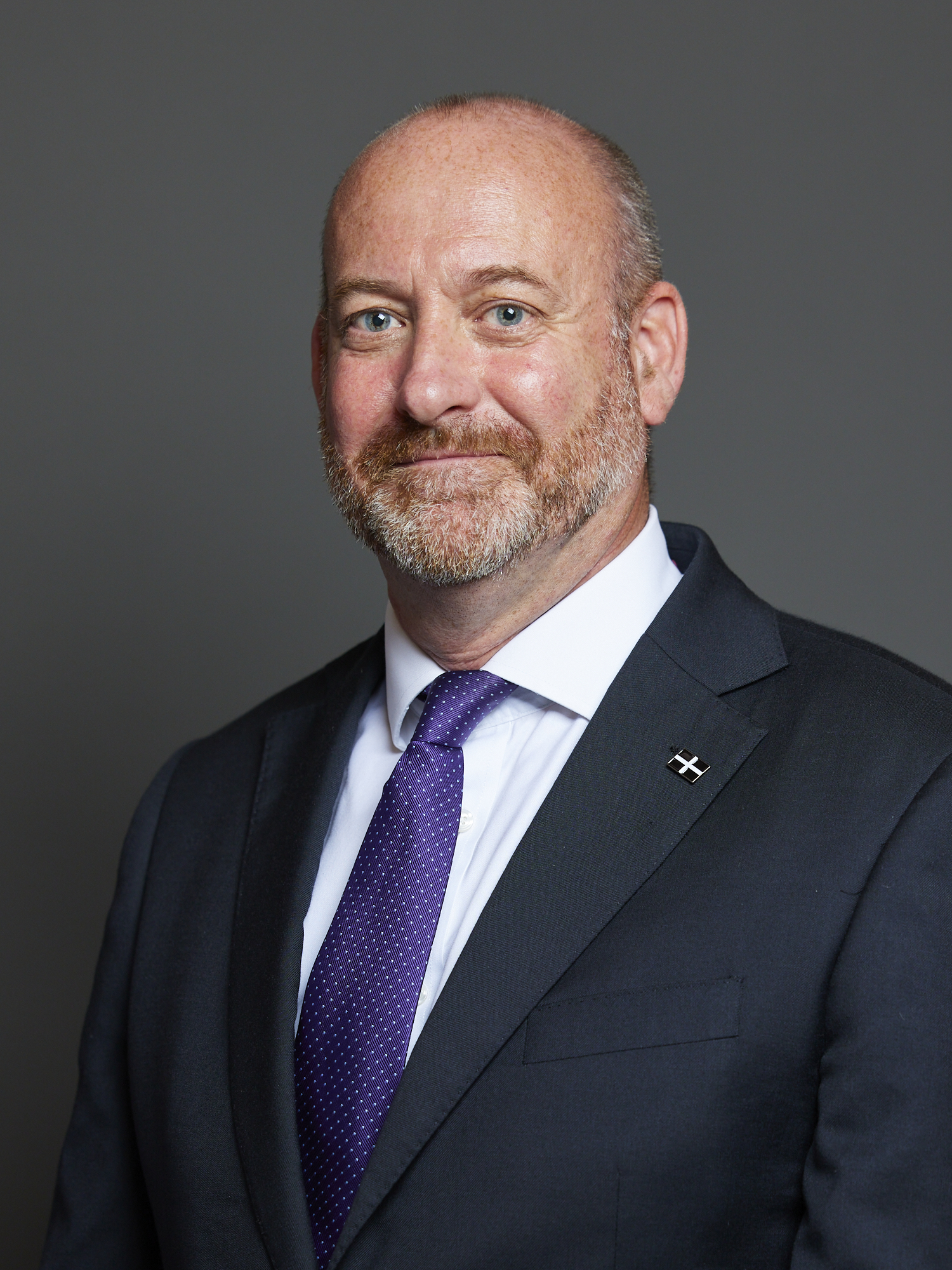
Perran Moon MP, 2024

- Vice Admiral Sir Adrian Johns (born 1951), former senior officer in the Royal Navy, the Governor of Gibraltar, 2009/2013.
- Tamsin Wilton (1952–2006), a lesbian activist, and the UK’s first Professor of Human Sexuality.
- Stephen Frost (born 1955), actor, writer and comedian
- Mark Prisk (born 1962), politician and MP for Hertford and Stortford from 2001 until 2019.
- Louise Casey, Baroness Casey of Blackstock (born 1965), a crossbench peer and current British government official
- Perran Moon (born 1970), politician and MP for Camborne and Redruth since July 2024.

=== Performing arts ===
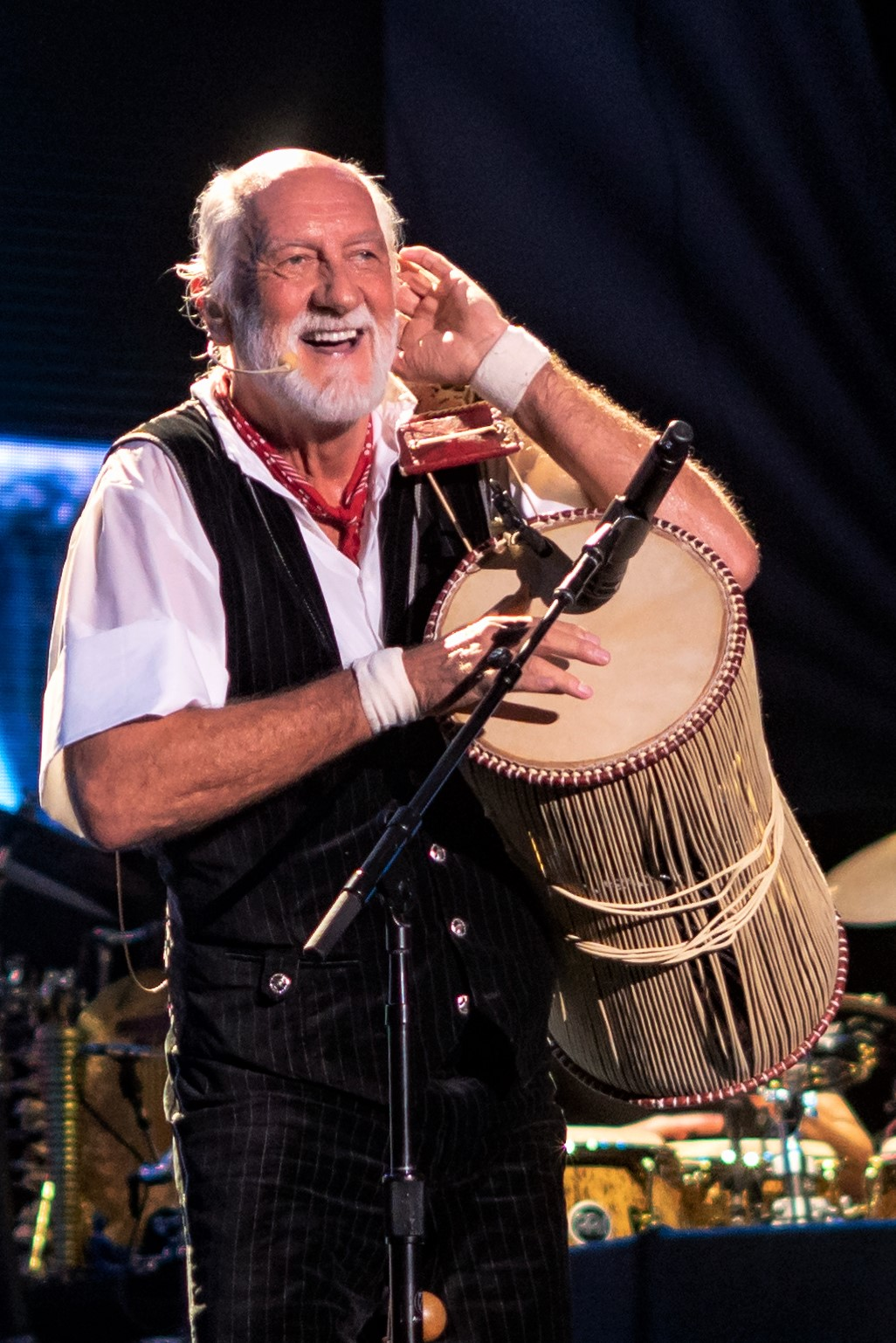
Mick Fleetwood, 2018

- Benjamin Luxon (1937–2024), baritone and narrator
- Alan Opie (born 1945), opera singer
- Mick Fleetwood (born 1947), drummer and co-founder of the band Fleetwood Mac
- Rory McGrath (born 1956), actor, writer and comedian
- Dame Kristin Scott Thomas (born 1960), actress
- Richard David James (born 1971), musician and DJ, also known as Aphex Twin, attended Redruth School
- Ben Salfield (born 1971), lutenist, guitarist and composer
- Luke Vibert (born 1973), musician and electronic music producer
- Hedluv + Passman (formed 2007) both grew up in Redruth and wrote the song "Druth", in tribute to the town
- Hevva, the traditional Cornish dance and music group, is based in Redruth.

=== Sport ===
- James Davey (1880–1951), rugby union player and team silver medallist at the 1908 Summer Olympics
- Bert Solomon (1885–1961), rugby union player, played 26 games for Cornwall and one for England
- John Collins (born 1928), former rugby union player. played 3 games for England
- Richard Sharp (1938–2025), rugby union player, played 28 games for Cornwall and 14 for England
- Peter Tregloan (born 1957), former title-holding strongman and powerlifter
- Rob Thirlby (born 1979) rugby union player who played 74 games and received call ups for England.

== Twin towns ==
Redruth is twinned with:

- Plumergat et Meriadec, Brittany, France
- Mineral Point, Wisconsin, United States
- Real del Monte, Hidalgo, Mexico

== See also ==
- Cornwall College
- New Redruth, a district of Johannesburg.
