= Garry John Martin =

British novelist (born 1948)

- Born: 17 March 1948 (age 78); Burton upon Trent, Staffordshire
- Education: Emmanuel College, Cambridge
- Occupation: Novelist
- Partner: Sue Lewis-Blake
- Website: garrymartin.org.uk

Garry John Martin (born 1948 in Burton upon Trent) is a British novelist.

== Education ==
Martin attended the local grammar school and art college and went on to read English at Emmanuel College, Cambridge. Upon graduating he was selected to take part in a BBC documentary charting the lives of graduates.

== Career ==
Martin worked as a systems analyst and took a year long trip halfway round the world by yacht, a journey he documented in a series of articles for Yachting and Boating Weekly. He worked as a teacher at Brentwood School, Essex and at King Edward's School, Birmingham. In an interview given to the school magazine at King Edward's, Birmingham, Martin was asked,"‘Do you think of yourself as a teacher who writes or a writer who teaches?" He replied, "A writer who teaches: I don’t think that the two are incompatible. If I’m actively involved in the craft of writing, what I learn is useful in my teaching."

By the time To Weave a Rainbow was published (1986) he was running a bookshop as well as the restaurant while spending his free time writing. This, his first novel, was reviewed in Warwickshire and Worcestershire Life: "Garry Martin writes with a rare incisiveness, coupled with the ability to reflect the very ordinary happenings of day-to-day life with remarkably keen perception."

He then, having sold his two businesses, returned to full-time teaching/writing, taking up a post at Cranleigh School as writer-in-residence. According to Mike Smith, ". . . these were turbulent times for him, not only because he was undergoing a divorce, but also because he had accepted a request from a friend to help in a mission to Kurdish Iraq in the immediate aftermath of the first Gulf War. He narrowly escaped capture whilst he was there, but managed to file dispatches for the BBC World Service and to write A Sane Asylum, a novel based on his journal of the trip."

On his return he moved to his final teaching post, at Nottingham High School. He focussed on Oxbridge entrance candidates and continued his writing. Robert Macfarlane, a pupil at this time, has commented, "Every so often you meet a teacher who changes your life as the adverts say. Garry Martin was that person for me." The school gave Martin extended leave to allow him to visit India to research a book on avatars. "In fact, he returned with the germ of a story to be called The Boy Who Made God Smile."

Martin's Orcadian Trilogy was launched in the Orkney Library and Archive in Kirkwall in 2019.

== Novels and short stories ==
- To Weave a Rainbow ISBN 0-947993-35-5
- Like a Fat Gold Watch (Amazon Kindle)
- Cling (Amazon Kindle)
- Beneath Napoleon’s Hat volume 1: Eagles without a Cliff ISBN 978-0-9931892-4-1
- Beneath Napoleon’s Hat volume 2: A Black Violet ISBN 978-0-9931892-5-8
- Beneath Napoleon’s Hat volume 3: Sylvia Beach and the Melancholy Jesus ISBN 978-0-9931892-6-5
- Patchwork ISBN 978-0-9931892-7-2
- The Boy Who Made God Smile ISBN 978-0-9931892-9-6
- A Sane Asylum ISBN 978-0-9955320-2-1
- Of Love and Gravity ISBN 978-0-9955320-4-5
- The Orcadian Trilogy ISBN 978-0-9955320-7-6
- The Truants ISBN 978-1-9162715-2-4

== Plays ==
- The Bar
- Showing
- Eating Seagull
- Job with an Interpreter

== Awards ==
- The Boy Who Made God Smile, Writing East Midlands Mentoring Prize 2013.
