= Helen Blaby =

British journalist

- Born: Northamptonshire, England
- Occupations: Journalist, radio presenter, author
- Years active: 2004–present
- Website: Helen Blaby – BBC Radio Northampton

Helen Blaby is a radio host and reporter with the BBC and a newspaper columnist.

== Early life and education ==
Part of Blaby's childhood was spent in Cornwall.

== Career ==
Her years as a broadcaster, according to CHBN Radio, have made her a household name. Beginning in 2004, Blaby was the breakfast traffic reporter for BBC Radio 5 Live, including reporting live from her home during a 2005 storm. In January 2010, she began reporting during the drivetime slot. Since then, she has been a presenter on BBC Northampton, hosting from noon to 3 pm on a magazine show Monday-Friday. She has also worked as a cover presenter for BBC Radio Cambridgeshire.

Blaby's travel reporting was referred to in a British Journalism Review article by media executive and broadcaster Matthew Bannister. The BBC sent her out on the road again, but this time with a team of health professionals at venues throughout Northamptonshire county. She met listeners and encouraged residents to get full health checks.

In 2006, she was one of several women in the news business interviewed by The Independent on what it's like being single and in the media.
