= Andrew Graham Rice =

Andrew Graham Rice (March 28, 1950 – February 6, 2024) was a British executive.

== Early life and education ==
Andrew Graham Rice was born in Radlett, Hertfordshire, England, the youngest of three sons. His father, Hugh Rice, served as a major with the Eighth Army during the Second World War and later worked for the de Havilland Aircraft Company and the diplomatic service, which stationed the family in Jordan. His mother, Joan Rice (née Bawden), served in the Women's Auxiliary Air Force and published her wartime diaries, Sand in My Shoes, in 2006.

Rice attended Lancing College, where his older brothers, Tim Rice and Jonathan Rice, an author on cricket and pop music, were also educated. He went on to study history and economics at Emmanuel College, Cambridge.

== Career ==
After completing his studies, Rice traveled to Africa and settled in Johannesburg, South Africa. He began his career in marketing with the South African branch of Henkel, a German chemical company. In the early 1990s, Rice became the director of strategy at the Johannesburg office of Ogilvy, an advertising and public relations agency.

In 1997, Rice founded Yellowwood Future Architects, a brand consultancy firm. The company grew over the years and was acquired by TBWA in 2008. Rice continued to serve as chairman following the acquisition.

Rice actively involved in sports, founding a social football team called the Cloggers. The team notably played a match at Wembley Stadium, and Rice also participated in a charity cricket match at Lord's during the same weekend.

Rice remained in South Africa for the majority of his adult life after an initial plan to travel from South Africa to India and then return to the United Kingdom was altered due to financial constraints. He spent most of his career in South Africa.
