= List of former administrative divisions in Cornwall =

This is a list of former administrative divisions in the ceremonial county of Cornwall, England, United Kingdom.

== Former district councils ==
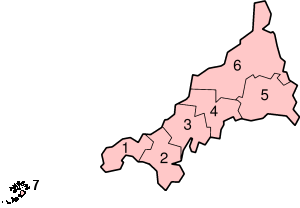
Map of Cornwall showing the districts established in 1974: 1 - Penwith; 2 - Kerrier; 3 - Carrick; 4 - Restormel; 5 - Caradon; 6 - North Cornwall

- Caradon
- Carrick
- Kerrier
- North Cornwall
- Penwith
- Restormel

== Former urban/rural districts and municipal boroughs ==
Municipal boroughs existed from 1835 and urban and rural districts existed from 1894 as the middle level of local government. Urban and rural districts were created through the Local Government Act 1894 (56 & 57 Vict. c. 73) to provide administration as a subdivision of administrative counties; civil parishes within the districts formed the lowest level of local government. Elected municipal boroughs were created under the Municipal Corporations Act 1835, but had their roots from mediaeval times, established as municipal corporations.

These were all abolished in 1974 under the Local Government Act 1972, to form the new non-metropolitan districts, six in Cornwall. Although districts and boroughs were created and abolished between these periods, as well as undergoing boundary changes after various reviews. This is a list of all the districts and boroughs that existed between these times.

District	Creation date	Abolition date	Notes
Bodmin Municipal Borough	1835	1974	
Bodmin Rural District	1894	1934	Abolished to create Wadebridge Rural District as well as enlarging others
Bude-Stratton Urban District	1900	1974	
Callington Urban District	1901	1934	
Calstock Rural District	1894	1934	
Camborne Urban District	1894	1934	Abolished to create Camborne–Redruth Urban District
Camborne–Redruth Urban District	1934	1974	Created from the abolition of Camborne Urban District, Helston Rural District, Redruth Rural District and Redruth Urban District
Camelford Rural District	1894	1974	
East Kerrier Rural District	1894	1934	Abolished to create Kerrier Rural District and enlarge others
Falmouth Municipal Borough	1835	1974	
Fowey Municipal Borough	1913	1968	Abolished to create St Austell with Fowey Municipal Borough
Hayle Urban District	1894	1934	
Helston Municipal Borough	1835	1974	
Helston Rural District	1894	1934	Abolished to create Camborne–Redruth Urban District and Kerrier Rural District and enlarging another
Holsworthy Rural District	1894	1934 (Cornwall)	Was in both counties of Cornwall and Devon, but after the single North Tamerton civil parish was transferred to Stratton Rural District in 1934 it fell fully within Devon. The district in Devon was abolished in 1974
Isles of Scilly Rural District	1890	1974	Unitary authority
Kerrier Rural District	1934	1974	Created from the abolition of East Kerrier Rural District, Helston Rural District and Redruth Rural District
Launceston Municipal Borough	1835	1974	
Launceston Rural District	1894	1974	
Liskeard Municipal Borough	1835	1974	
Liskeard Rural District	1894	1974	
Looe Urban District	1898	1974	
Lostwithiel Municipal Borough	1885	1968	Abolished to create enlarged St Austell Rural District
Ludgvan Urban District	1894	1934	
Madron Urban District	1894	1934	
Newquay Urban District	1894	1974	
Padstow Urban District	1894	1968	Abolished to create enlarged Wadebridge Rural District
Paul Urban District	1894	1934	Abolished to enlarge Penzance Municipal Borough and West Penwith Rural District
Penryn Municipal Borough	1835	1974	
Penzance Municipal Borough	1835	1974	
Phillack Urban District	1894	1934	
Redruth Rural District	1894	1934	Abolished to create Camborne–Redruth Urban District and Kerrier Rural District and enlarge others
Redruth Urban District	1894	1934	Abolished to create Camborne–Redruth Urban District
Saltash Municipal Borough	1885	1974	
St Austell Rural District	1894	1974	
St Austell with Fowey Municipal Borough	1968	1974	Created from the abolition of Fowey Municipal Borough and St Austell Urban District
St Columb Major Rural District	1894	1934	Abolished to create Wadebridge Rural District and enlarge others
St Germans Rural District	1894	1974	
St Ives Municipal Borough	1835	1974	
St Just Urban District	1897	1974	
Stratton Rural District	1894	1974	
Torpoint Urban District	1904	1974	
Truro Municipal Borough	1835	1974	
Truro Rural District	1894	1974	
Wadebridge and Padstow Rural District	1968	1974	Created from the abolition of Padstow Urban District and Wadebridge Rural District
Wadebridge Rural District	1934	1968	Created from the abolition of Bodmin Rural District, St Columb Major Rural District and Wadebridge Urban District. Abolished to create Wadebridge and Padstow Rural District
Wadebridge Urban District	1898	1934	Abolished to create Wadebridge Rural District
West Penwith Rural District	1894	1974	

== See also ==
- List of civil parishes in Cornwall (pre-2009)
- Hundreds of Cornwall
