= Veryan =

Village in Cornwall, England

Coordinates: 50.214°N 4.931°W

Veryan: Cornish: Elerghi
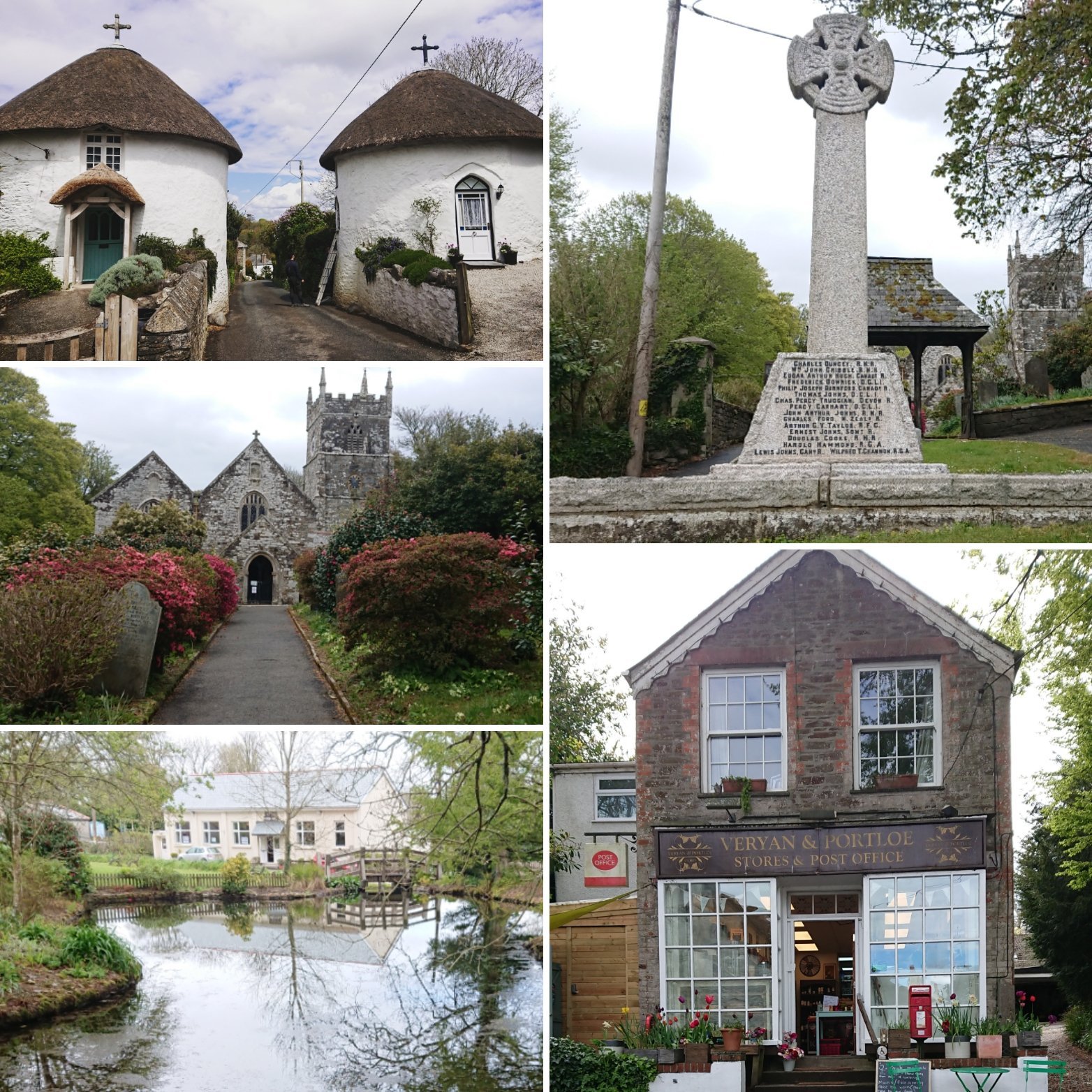
- Clockwise: Veryan Round Houses, Veryan Memorial Cross, Veryan & Portloe Stores, Veryan Pond & Parish Hall, St Symphorian's Church

- Location within Cornwall
- Population: 945 (2011 census including Carne)
- OS grid reference: SW9139
- Civil parish: Veryan
- Unitary authority: Cornwall
- Ceremonial county: Cornwall
- Region: South West
- Country: England
- Sovereign state: United Kingdom
- Post town: Truro
- Postcode district: TR2
- Dialling code: 01872
- Police: Devon and Cornwall
- Fire: Cornwall
- Ambulance: South Western
- UK Parliament: South East Cornwall

Veryan (Cornish: Elerghi) is a coastal civil parish and village on the Roseland Peninsula in Cornwall, England, United Kingdom. The village has been described as one of Cornwall's loveliest inland villages and as ′a mild tropic garden′ by John Betjeman. It is probably best known for the round-houses, built by the vicar Jeremiah Trist in the early 19th century.

== Geography ==
The southern boundary of the parish is along the English Channel from the Pendower stream in the west to Portholland in the east. To the west is the parish of Gerrans and on the east is St Michael Caerhays. Veryan is bounded by the parishes of Philleigh, Ruan Lanihorne and Tregony in the north. The parish comprises 5,592 acres (2,263 ha) of land and 35 acres (14 ha) of water.

The A3078 is the main form of communication and runs along the north of the parish from St Mawes joining the A390 at Probus. The nearest railway stations are at Truro and St Austell. The main settlements are Veryan Churchtown, Veryan Green, Portloe and the smaller hamlets of Trewartha, Treviskey, Carne and Camels. Veryan is served by a post office (Veryan and Portloe Stores) and a public house (the New Inn).

== History ==
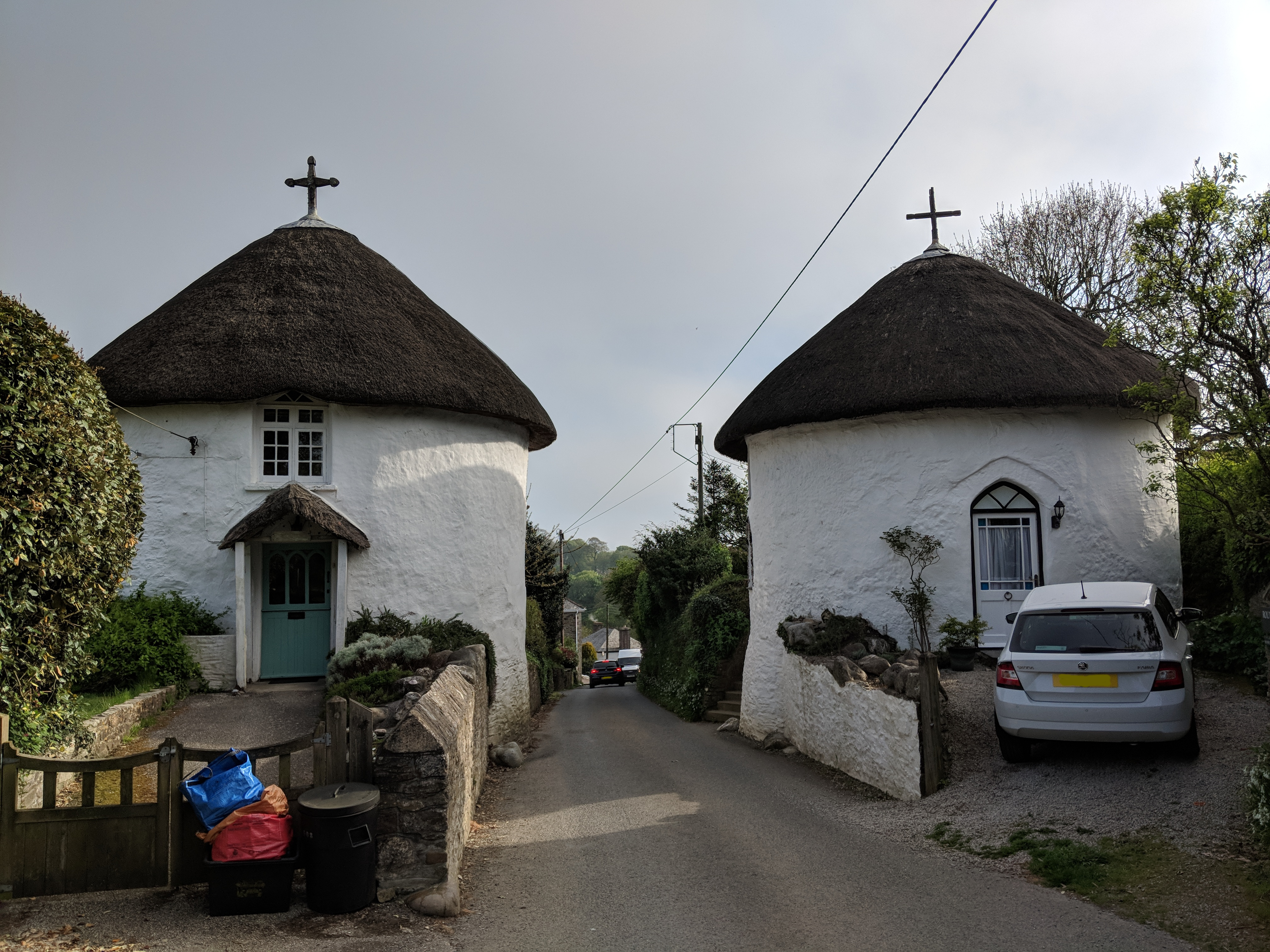
Two round houses built by the Vicar for his daughters

Veryan was originally mentioned in the Domesday Book of 1086 as the manor of Elerchi (now Elerkey in street names etc.), which was derived from 'elerch', the Cornish for 'swan'. The origin of the name is by corruption of "Symphorian" to "Severian" and then "Saint Veryan". The church is one of the few in west Cornwall for which there is no evidence of its existence before the Norman Conquest. The church was given by the lord of the manor of Elerky to the monks of Montacute in Somerset, c. 1110, but a later lord, John de Montacute, gave it to the Dean and Chapter of Exeter, ca. 1220, and they held it until 1859. The parish church of St Symphorian has an unusual plan with a tower south of the south transept and a north aisle. Parts of the church are Norman and others Decorated in style.

Melinsey Mill is situated within Veryan. The mill itself was built in 1565 and now the site stands as a tourist attraction which serves food.

In the 19th century Veryan's vicar and local land owner Jeremiah Trist expanded the village's buildings. He convinced parishioners to attend church on a regular basis, and built two schools and a series of round houses. The school for boys was built in 1814, and on its site now stands the present infant and junior school. A "school of industry" for girls was also built, now a thatched house behind the New Inn. The round houses were built between 1815 and 1818 by Trist, inspired by one in St Winnow. There is a pair at the entrance to the village at Veryan Green and another two at village entrance on the Pendower road. All four are thatched, while a fifth behind the school has a slate roof. Trist installed crosses on each of the houses and they were said to deter the devil from entering the village. The large house, Parc Behan, overlooking the church was also built by Trist as his dwelling: the vicarage was too small and in a bad state of repair.

=== Carne Beacon ===
Carne Beacon, lying a mile from Veryan, is said to be the burial place of the Cornish saint, King Gerennius (Geraint). Local folklore suggests that the burial mound contains the golden boat with silver oars, on which his body was brought across Gerrans Bay. There is no archaeological evidence for the existence of this boat.

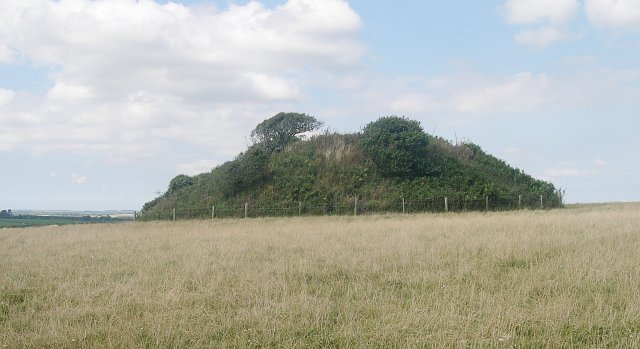
Carne Beacon, the site of T2 Veryan Post

During World War II, Carne Beacon became the site of the very first Cornish above ground aircraft reporting post. It opened in January 1940 as part of No 20 Group Truro and was designated the name of T2 Veryan Post. The site was chosen because of its advantageous views over the sea. Local residents strongly objected to its placing on such a hallowed point but they were overruled by the Air Ministry. The view was excellent for this post which was a wooden structure some 3 metres by 4 metres square. The post consisted of an observation area with aircraft plotting instrument and a small space for making refreshments and gaining shelter. They communicated by a land line telephone to Truro where the main operations room was based. It was continuously patrolled and had to report every aircraft in a ten-mile radius. It was later equipped with high frequency radio which enabled it to communicate with aircraft that sent out distress signals. It was later refurbished with concrete and remained in use after the war mainly staffed by villagers spare time. In 1962 the site closed and moved to Nare Head. The site was demolished and some remains are viewable at the Veryan Post Museum. In present-day all that remains of the post are its concrete foundations.

=== Local government ===
In 1894 Veryan became part of the Truro Rural District which was abolished in 1974 under the Local Government Act 1972, and Veryan became part of Carrick District Council. The district was abolished in 2009 and Veryan now falls under the unitary Cornwall Council. Veryan also elects eleven councillors to the parish council. The vicarage cross consists of an ancient shaft with a modern base and cross head; it was erected early in the 20th century.

== Sport ==
Veryan Sports and Social Club was opened in 1984 and provide facilities for cricket, bowling and tennis. Veryan Cricket Club was founded in 1860, although the game was played much earlier with a writer from The West Briton newspaper crediting Trist as inspiring the locals to play cricket since 1810. The team joined the Cornwall Cricket League in 1951 and played in Senior 1 East in 1983; the highest level in Cornwall at that time. They currently have two teams playing in Division 2 East and Division 6 Central. Their most famous player was David Halfyard.

Veryan Football Club play in the Duchy League and are the current champions of the second division; level 16 in the English pyramid system.

== Tourism ==
Veryan attracts tourism due to its location on the Roseland Peninsula and has bed and breakfasts, hotels and guest houses. The round houses are also a factor in the parish's tourism interest and are rented out for accommodation. Veryan is also popular because of its location near the South West Coast Path, a route for keen walkers in Cornwall. Locals also let visitors use the Indoor Bowling Green. The village also has a Sports Pavilion with provision for tennis, cricket, bowls and a children’s playground. Carne Beacon also attracts visitors as it is open to the public with prior contact.

== Film and television ==
Various scenes for the 1992 television drama series The Camomile Lawn, based on Mary Wesley's book of the same name, were filmed in Veryan (Broom Parc House) and on the coast at nearby Portloe.
