= Old Council Offices, Camborne =

Municipal building in Camborne, Cornwall, England

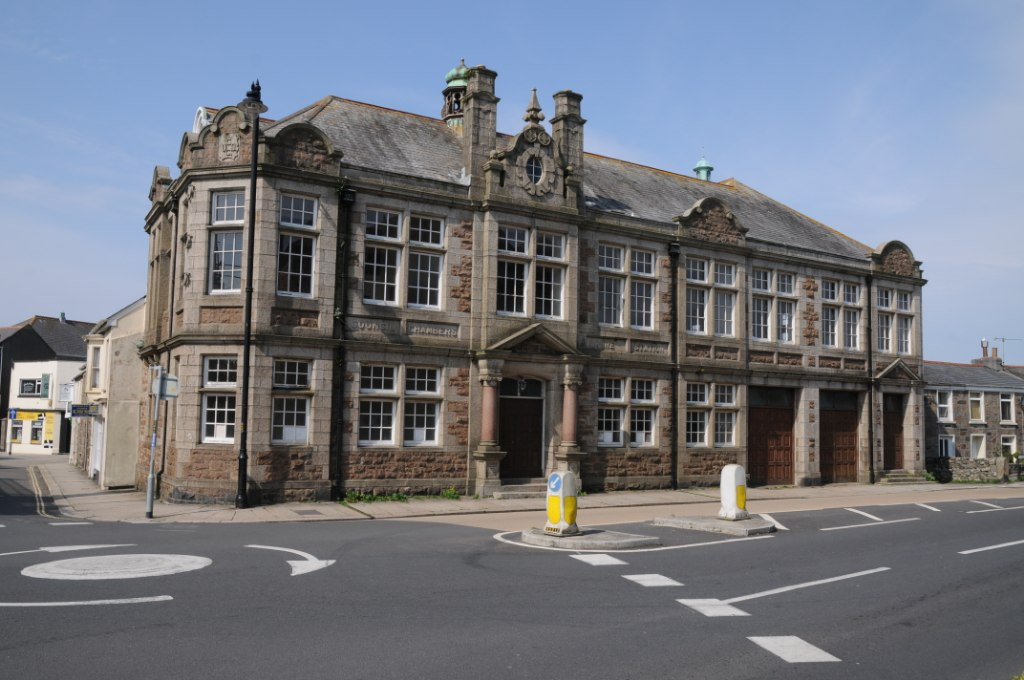
- Old Council Offices, Camborne

- Shown in Cornwall
- 50.2117°N 5.2977°W
- Location: Trevenson Street, Camborne, Cornwall, England

History
- Built: 1903; 123 years ago

Site notes
- Architectural style: Renaissance Revival style

Listed Building – Grade II
- Official name: Old Council Offices
- Designated: 23 February 1987
- Reference no.: 1142644

The Old Council Offices are in Trevenson Street, Camborne, Cornwall, England. The building, which was used as the offices of Camborne-Redruth Urban District Council and is currently vacant, is a grade II listed building.

== History ==
Following significant population growth, largely associated with the tin mining industry, a local board was established in Camborne in 1873. The local board, which usually met in the parish vestry room in Church Street, was replaced by the Camborne Urban District Council in 1894. In the early 20th century, the council decided to commission dedicated council offices. The site they selected was at the western end of Trevenson Street overlooking a junction known as "The Cross", and had, in part, been occupied by an old smithy.

The new building was designed in the Renaissance Revival style, built in rubble masonry with ashlar dressings and was completed in 1903. The original design involved a broadly symmetrical main frontage of five bays facing onto Trevenson Street. The central bay, which was slightly projected forward, featured a doorway flanked by Ionic order columns of polished granite supporting an open pediment; on the first floor, there was cross-window surmounted by a moulded gable which contained an oeil-de-boeuf and was flanked by chimney stacks. The other bays were mainly fenestrated with cross windows. The first and fifth bays were also slightly projected forward and were also surmounted by moulded gables. The structure was extended to the right by three extra bays in a similar style to create a fire station in 1909.

Camborne Urban District Council was abolished in 1934, when Camborne became part of the larger Camborne-Redruth Urban District. The building served as the headquarters for the new Camborne-Redruth Urban District Council until 1946, when the council moved a short distance to a large converted house called Veor on South Terrace in Camborne.

The fire service continued to use the building as a fire station until a modern fire station was erected in College Street in 1963. The building in Trevenson Street was subsequently used as a religious centre in the 1980s, and as an office for the local Conservative Association in the 2010s.

An extensive programme of works to restore the exterior of the building was carried out with grant aid from the Camborne, Roskear and Tuckingmill Townscape Heritage Initiative in the early 21st century.
