= George Martin (priest) =

George Martin (22 September 1864 – 19 December 1946) was a priest in the Church of England who gave up his living and went to Southwark, where he became known among the poor as the 'modern St Anthony'.

Martin was born in St Breward in Cornwall, son of the George Martin (a priest and Doctor of Divinity) and educated at Blundell's School in Tiverton and at St John's College in Cambridge, gaining his Bachelor of Arts (BA) in 1886, and his Cambridge Master of Arts (MA Cantab) in 1890.

Martin was ordained a deacon in Truro in 1887 and priest in 1888. From 1887–91 he was curate of Duloe in Cornwall, 1891–93 curate of Marhamchurch and, 1893–99, rector of Caerhayes.

On giving up his living Martin went to Southwark, where he was known among the poor as the 'modern St Anthony' and it was said he ‘possessed an influence almost hypnotic and a power for good that was irresistible’. Martin tramped the streets of Southwark in a ragged frock coat helping the poor of the borough, lodging in the same small cell-like room for 48 years and subsisting mainly on bread and margarine.

Having lived for many years in apparent penury, on his death left a considerable estate, leaving £1000 to St John's College to provide assistance for students from Cornwall reading for Holy Orders and the residue to the Bishop of Southwark and the Mayor for the poor of that borough.
