= Market House, Camborne =

Commercial building in Camborne, Cornwall, England

Market House
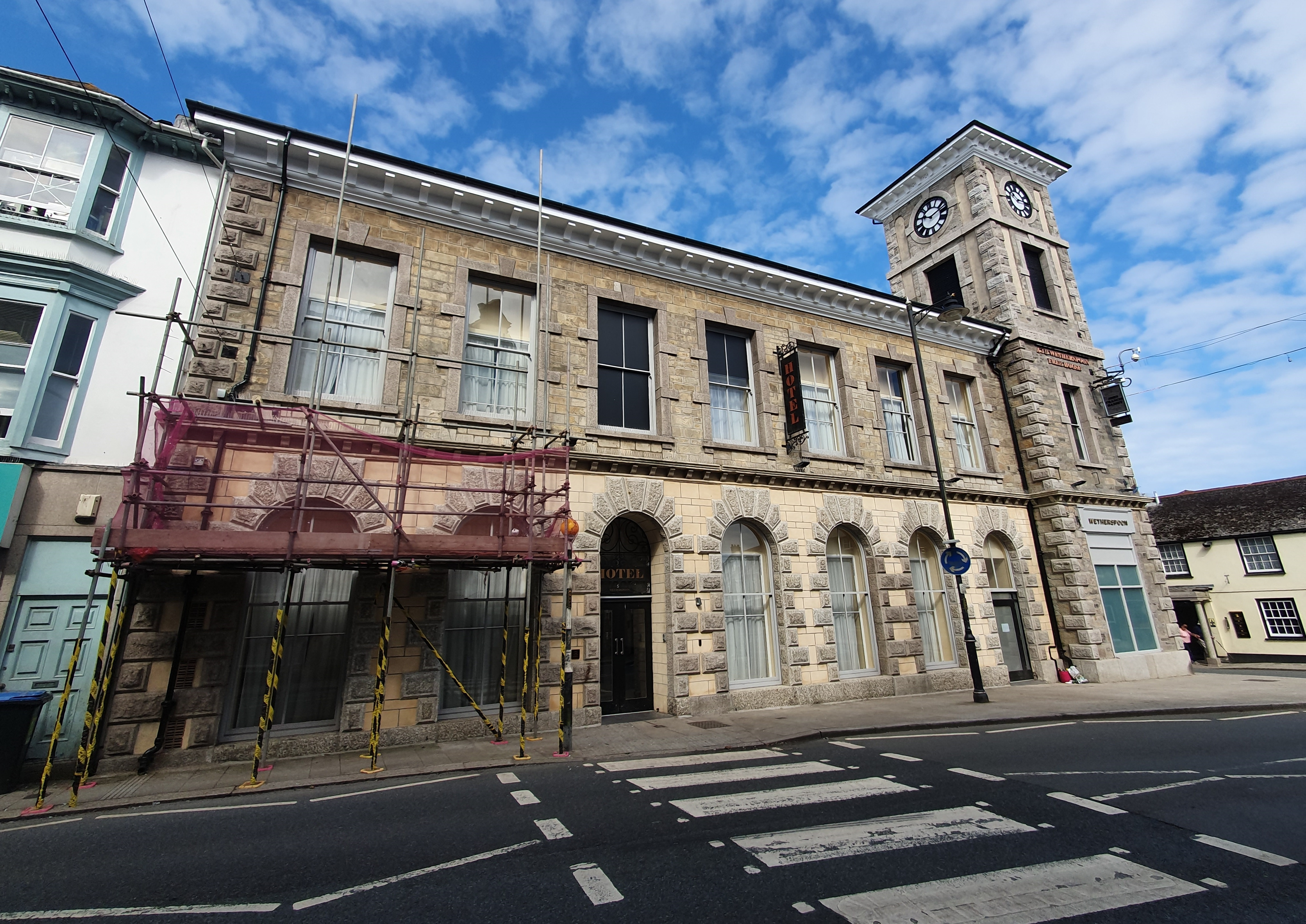

- Shown in Cornwall
- 50.2135°N 5.3011°W
- Location: Church Street, Camborne, Cornwall, England

History
- Built: 1867

Site notes
- Architectural style: Italianate style

Listed Building – Grade II
- Official name: The Berkeley Centre
- Designated: 4 November 1976
- Reference no.: 1311028

The Market House, also known as Camborne Town Hall, is a commercial building in Church Street in Camborne, Cornwall, England. The structure, which is currently used as a hotel and public house, is a Grade II listed building.

== History ==
The town was first granted a right to hold markets in 1708. In the early 19th century, a market house was commissioned by the lord of the manor, Francis Basset, 1st Baron de Dunstanville, whose seat was at Tehidy House. It was erected on the corner of Commercial Street and Church Street in 1802 and rebuilt in the 1830s.

Following damage caused by a major storm in 1864, the then lord of the manor, John Francis Basset, offered to rebuild the structure again. The new building was designed in the Italianate style, built in ashlar sandstone and was completed in 1867. It originally consisted of a rectangular block of seven bays facing onto on Commercial Street with a four-stage tower on the right. The main block featured round headed openings with voussoirs and keystones on the ground floor and sash windows with architraves and keystones on the first floor. The tower featured a sash window with an architrave and a keystone in the second stage and a louvred opening in the third stage. It was surmounted by a cornice, a low pyramid-shaped roof and a weather vane. Internally, the principal rooms were the town hall on the ground floor and the courtroom for the magistrates on the first floor. There was also an eleven bay, single storey market hall extending along Church Street: the central bay, which slightly projected forward, contained a large round headed opening which was surmounted by a pediment containing a carved roundel in the tympanum. The market hall was also intended for use as a corn exchange.

In October 1873, a trial took place in the building, during which the prosecuting solicitor demanded that the miners, James and Joseph Bawden, be sentenced to five months on the treadmill in Bodmin Jail for their part in the Camborne riots. During the trial, the defendants' supporters threatened to blow up the Redruth Courthouse, which as the small debts courthouse was particularly unpopular with the miners, and pursued the prosecutor down the street. As it was, many of the windows in the market house at Camborne were shattered in the disturbances which followed.

An hour-striking clock, designed and manufactured by Dent of London, was installed in the fourth stage of the tower in 1875. In 1911, the complex was considerably expanded by the addition of an extra floor above the single-storey market hall. The market hall was leased by the Basset family to William Tangye in September 1887. However, the use of the building as a corn exchange declined significantly in the wake of the Great Depression of British Agriculture in the late 19th century.

The Church Street block, which became known as St. George's Hall, was converted into a cinema known as the Picturedrome in early 1909. It was rebranded as the Cinedrome in 1920 and as the Scala Cinema in 1937. Following the closure of the cinema the early 1960s, the building was acquired by the Bartle family and became a skating rink and concert venue. Performers who took part in events at the skating rink included the vocal group, The Cascades, in 1963 and the rock band, The Who, in October 1965.

In 1979, following a change of ownership, the venue started operating as a nightclub known as "The Berkeley Centre": the local band Muse performed there in the mid-1990s. In September 2004, it was acquired by the Vigus family and rebranded as "The Corn Exchange". After the owners of the Corn Exchange got into financial difficulties, the building was purchased by Wetherspoon in 2010 and, following a major programme of refurbishment works costing £1.3 million, it reopened as a public house known as the "John Francis Basset" (on the Church Street frontage) in May 2011, and then as a hotel (on the Commercial Street frontage) in July 2015.

== See also ==
- Corn exchanges in England
