= Henry Charles Tonking =

British organist (1863–1926)

Henry Charles Tonking (17 January 1863 – 7 June 1926) was a British organist. Tonking was organist at the Royal Aquarium, Westminster (1886), St Luke's Church, West Norwood (1887), and, from 1888, at the Covent Garden Opera. He also gave recitals at the Crystal Palace, at the Bow and Bromley Institute, and the Royal Albert Hall Sunday Concerts (1895–1905).

== Life ==
Tonking was born in Camborne, Cornwall, England. As a child Tonking received his first musical instructions from his father who was a good amateur violinist, according to Groves. Later he studied the organ, pianoforte and harmony with John Hopkins Nunn (1827–1905). He was only thirteen when he was appointed organist of Illogan Parish Church, Cornwall (1876).

Henry Charles Tonking

In 1881 he went to study at the Royal Academy of Music, London. His professors were Dr Charles Steggall (organ), Monsieur Sainton (violin), Mr Ebenezer Prout (harmony & composition) and Sir George MacFarren (Pianoforte). After receiving six medals and a certificate of merit Tonking was appointed sub-professor of the organ to Steggall at the Royal Academy in 1885. Whilst there he had Henry Wood as a pupil and also became organist of Westminster Chapel, and of St Lawrence Jewry.

Henry Wood recounts that he stayed at Tonking's Cornish home, where they gave recitals with H.C. on the violin and himself at the piano or organ at different venues throughout Cornwall.

When he was a member of the orchestra of the Royal "Italian Opera" and "Promenade Concerts," Covent Garden, he gave organ and violin recitals around Great Britain with Bernhard Molique Carrodus.

In 1892, H.C. Tonking was engaged by the management of the International Horticultural Exhibition, Earl's Court, London. From May to October he performed approx. three thousand pieces, in a series of recitals "at the one place and on one instrument" (supplied by Messrs. Lewis & Co. of Brixton). This was claimed to be "The Biggest Programme on Earth".

It was on the organ that H.C. Tonking made his name, appearing at all the international exhibitions, often in great demand playing at the Crystal Palace and Bow & Bromley Institute. He frequently gave recitals at the Royal Albert Hall Willis Organ (1895–1905).

On 6 August 1904 at the Promenade Concerts, H.C. Tonking premiered the Italian Organ "Maestro" Enrico Bossi's Concerto in A minor (Op. 100) for Organ and Orchestra. (Proms Archive)

Later in life, he returned to Cornwall where he became organist of the Parish Church at St Ives and then at Newquay Wesley (1908–1920). During his sojourn in Cornwall he remarked to a friend that he was a rolling stone, "never stayed long enough to wear out the seat of his trousers at any one organ console". In his last years he turned to cinema playing up the North, at the Newcastle and Grosvenor Cinemas, Glasgow (1925).

He wrote little music, but his best known organ pieces are "Grand Festival March, Illogan" (1896), "Fantasia on an Easter Hymn" (1897), "Coronation March" (1911), "Royal Air Force March" (c. 1920 – possibly unpublished), "Fanfare of Trumpets" and "Andantino in D". He also has a few published songs (1891–97). These include "A song of the bells" and "Liberty". An organ and violin duo also exists.

Henry Wood says that he was an "exceedingly gifted organist and violinist . . . . . and a tremendous worker." He taught me to play Bach's organ preludes and fugues. His phrasing and registration of the "great G minor" and the Toccata and Fugue in D minor were masterly." H.C.Tonking's eccentricity deprived him of many friends, yet he was kind-hearted and often refused to take a pupil's fee when he knew it could not be afforded.

Wood composed the well known "Sailors' Hornpipe" under the pseudonym Klenovsky. This was an inspirational orchestral arrangement conceived after watching H.C. Tonking's tremendous mastery of the pedal-board in playing the hornpipe at a terrific rate, as a solo. Wood's composition was performed at the "PROMS" on 05-10-1929, three years after H.C's death.

Tonking died in Glasgow, Scotland, in 1926.
