= Redruth Rural District =

Former local government area in the UK

Coordinates: 50.215°N 5.165°W

Redruth Rural District was a local government division of Cornwall in England, UK, between 1894 and 1934. Established under the Local Government Act 1894, the rural district was abolished in 1934 to create Camborne–Redruth Urban District and Kerrier Rural District, as well as enlarging Truro Rural District and West Penwith Rural District.
