= Portholland =

Coordinates: 50°14′11″N 4°51′49″W

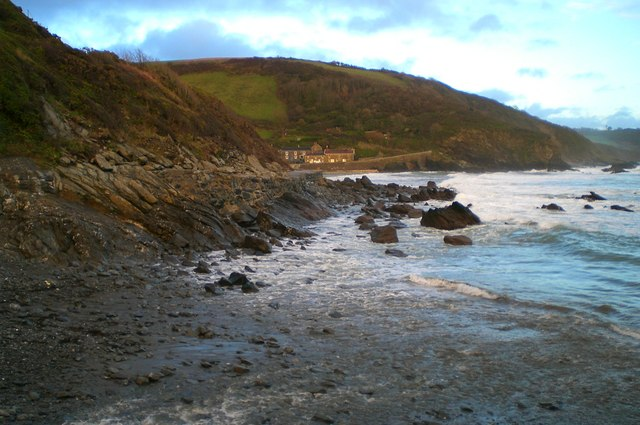
- East Portholland from West Portholland
- Civil parish: St Michael Caerhays; Veryan
- Shire county: Cornwall
- Post town: ST AUSTELL (East Portholland)
- Postcode district: PL26 (East Portholland)
- Post town: TRURO (West Portholland)
- Postcode district: TR2 (West Portholland)

Portholland (Cornish: Porthalan) is a settlement in Cornwall, England, UK. It is on the south coast in the civil parish of St Michael Caerhays. The name Portholland comes from the Cornish language elements porth, meaning 'cove' or 'harbour', and Alan, a personal name.

Portholland is two adjacent villages, West Portholland and East Portholland at opposite ends of two separate namesake beaches which join in the middle. It is possible to walk between the two villages on the beach at low tide. West Portholland is in Veryan civil parish, the parish boundary is a minor stream between East and West Portholland. East Portholland used to have a post office and general store, but both have shut down. Portholland lies within the Cornwall Area of Outstanding Natural Beauty (AONB).

East Portholland was a filming location for the village scenes of the fictional Welsh island Cairnholm in the 2016 film Miss Peregrine's Home for Peculiar Children.

There is a cliff path connecting West and East Portholland which has several distinct features such as paw prints in the concrete and the text “PAN MOJ”

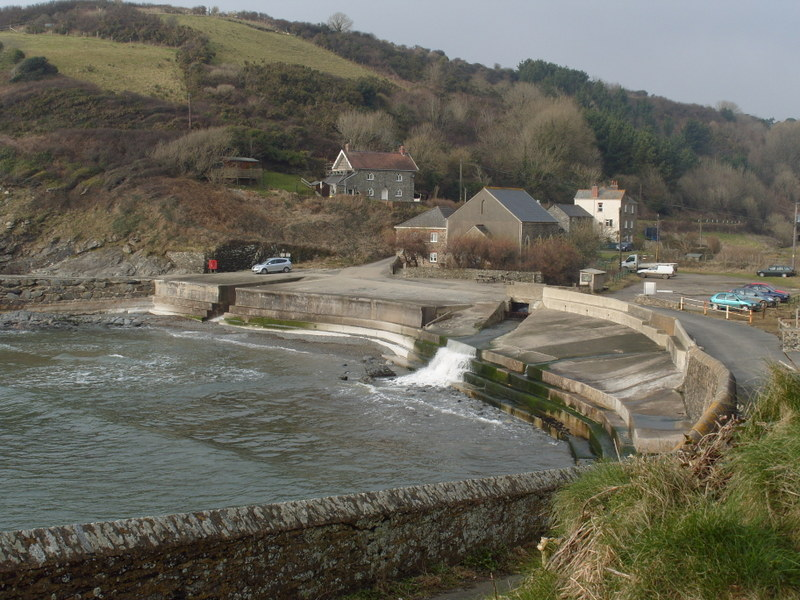
A stream discharging into the sea at East Portholland
