= St Austell Rural District =

Former local government area in the UK

Coordinates: 50.301°N 4.820°W

St Austell Rural District was a local government division of Cornwall in England, UK, between 1894 and 1974. Established under the Local Government Act 1894, the rural district was reduced to create Fowey Municipal Borough in 1913 and enlarged by the abolition of Bodmin Rural District and St Columb Major Rural District in 1934 and Lostwithiel Municipal Borough in 1968.

In 1974 the district was abolished under the Local Government Act 1972, forming part of the new Restormel district.

== Civil parishes ==
The civil parishes within the district were:

- Colan
- Grampound with Creed
- Lanlivery
- Lostwithiel
- Luxulyan
- Mawgan in Pydar
- Roche
- St Columb Major
- St Dennis
- St Enoder
- St Ewe
- St Goran
- St Mewan
- St Michael Caerhays
- St Sampson
- St Stephen in Brannel
- St Wenn
