= Old Courthouse, Redruth =

Municipal building in Redruth, Cornwall, England

The Old Courthouse
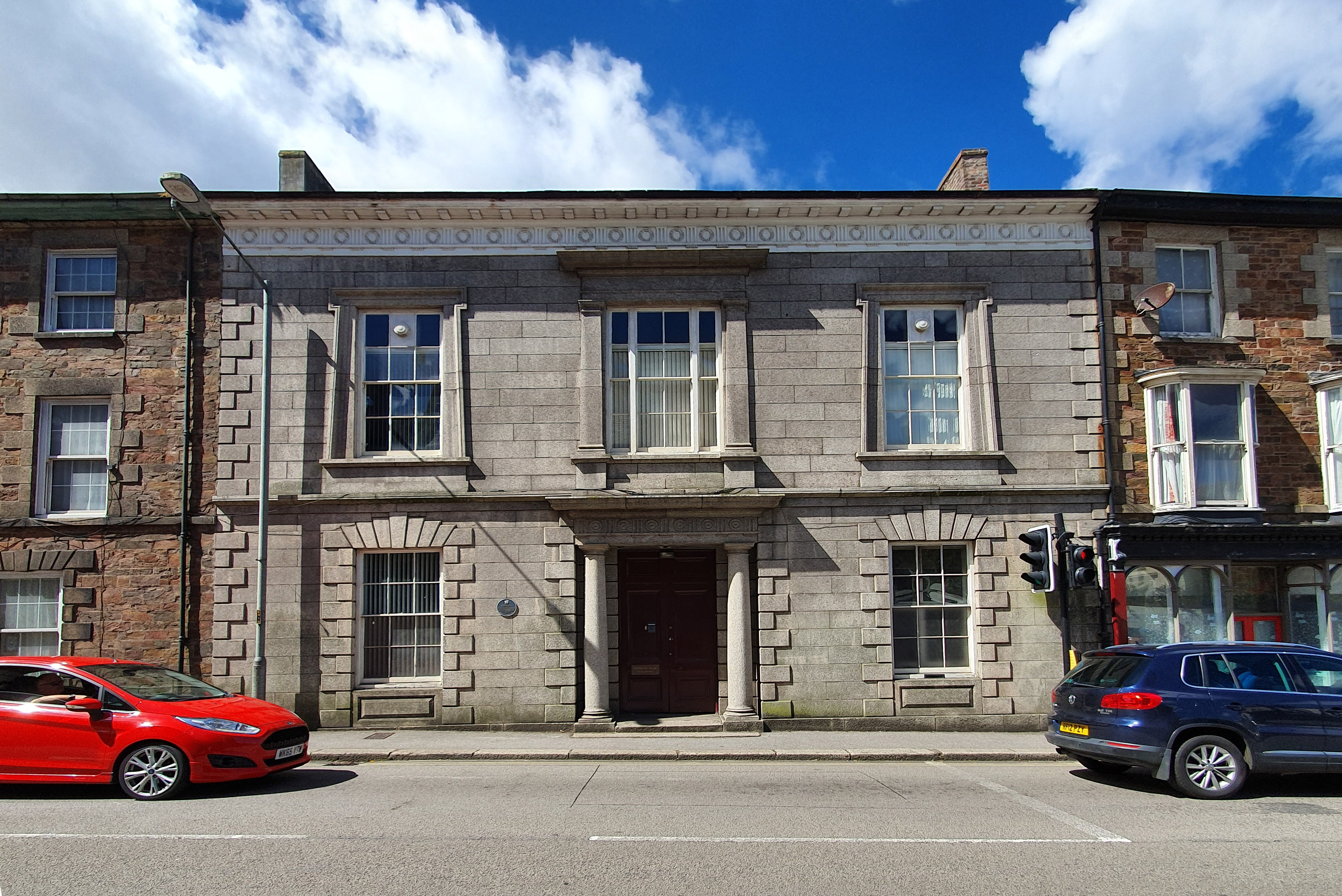
- The building in 2022

- Shown in Cornwall
- 50.2319°N 5.2288°W
- Location: Penryn Street, Redruth, Cornwall, England

History
- Built: 1850

Site notes
- Architect: Robert Blee
- Architectural style: Neoclassical style

Listed Building – Grade II
- Official name: Old town hall and court house
- Designated: 27 September 1978
- Reference no.: 1142565

The Old Courthouse, also known as the Old Town Hall, is a historic building in Penryn Street in Redruth, a town in Cornwall, in England. The structure, which was used for judicial purposes before being converted for use as a social club, is a Grade II listed building.

== History ==
The building was commissioned as a courthouse established to enforce debts under the Small Debts Act 1845. The site the court officials selected was on the west side of Penryn Street. It was designed by Robert Blee in the neoclassical style, built in granite and was completed in 1850. It also served as a public events venue and, in April 1853, the Redruth Band performed a concert there. By the 1870s, the building was being let out for monthly meetings of the County Court, which had exclusive jurisdiction over all small claims throughout west Cornwall.

In October 1873, a trial took place at Camborne Town Hall, during which the prosecuting solicitor, Richard Holloway, demanded that the miners, James and Joseph Bawden, be sentenced to five months on the treadmill in Bodmin Jail for their part in the Camborne riots. During the trial, the defendants' supporters threatened to blow up the Redruth Courthouse, which as the small debts courthouse was particularly unpopular with the miners, and pursued the prosecutor down the street. The Redruth Courthouse was also used as a Wesleyan reform meeting room at that time.

In 1891, it became the office of the solicitor and archaeologist, Thurstan Collins Peter, who outside his legal activities, carried out excavations at Carn Brea. Peter became clerk of the rural sanitary authority and, after that entity was superseded by Redruth Rural District Council in 1894, he became the clerk of the rural district council with his office in the courthouse.

After the county court was transferred to Camborne in 1977, the building went on to serve as a private members club, originally founded as a gentlemen's club but later expanded to include ladies as well. Monthly meetings of the Redruth and Camborne Branch of the Royal Naval Association continue to be held in the club.

== Architecture ==
The building is constructed of granite, and has a slate roof. It is two storeys high and three bays wide. The central bay features a central recessed porch formed by a pair of Tuscan order columns supporting a frieze with wreaths and a cornice; on the first floor there is a central window flanked by pilasters supporting an entablature and a cornice. The outer bays are fenestrated by sash windows with voussoirs on the ground floor and by sash windows with architraves on the first floor. At roof level there is a frieze with triglyphs and wreaths and projecting eaves supported by a series of mutules. Inside, there is an original staircase leading up to the former courtroom on the first floor. The building was grade II listed in 1978.
