= East Kerrier Rural District =

Former local government area in the UK

Coordinates: 50.125°N 5.144°W

East Kerrier Rural District was a local government division of Cornwall in England, UK, between 1894 and 1934. Established under the Local Government Act 1894, the rural district was abolished in 1934 to create Kerrier Rural District, as well as enlarging Falmouth Municipal Borough, Penryn Municipal Borough and Truro Rural District.
