= Camborne =

Town in Cornwall, England

Coordinates: 50.213°N 5.300°W

Camborne: Cornish: Kammbronn
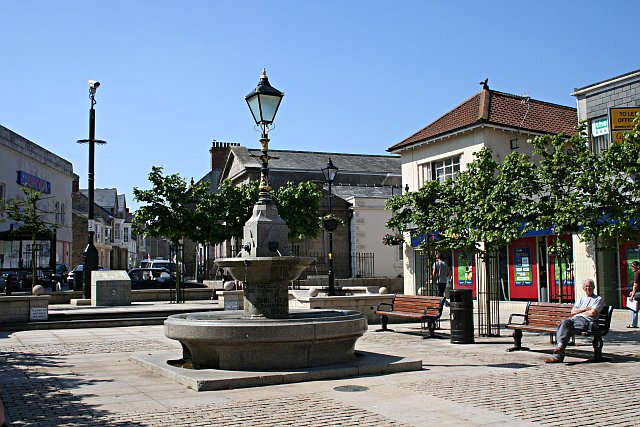
- Commercial Square, Camborne Town Centre

- Coat of arms

- Location within Cornwall
- Interactive map of Camborne
- Population: 23,831 (Parish, 2021); 20,450 (Built-up area, 2021)
- OS grid reference: SW645400
- Civil parish: Camborne
- Unitary authority: Cornwall
- Ceremonial county: Cornwall
- Region: South West
- Country: England
- Sovereign state: United Kingdom
- Post town: CAMBORNE
- Postcode district: TR14
- Dialling code: 01209
- Police: Devon and Cornwall
- Fire: Cornwall
- Ambulance: South Western
- UK Parliament: Camborne and Redruth
- Website: www.camborne-tc.gov.uk

Camborne (Cornish: Kammbronn [ˈkamːbrɔnː], meaning "crooked hill") is a town and civil parish in Cornwall, England. At the 2021 census the population of the parish was 23,831 and the population of the built-up area was 20,450. The town lies about 2 miles (3 km) inland, but the northern boundary of the parish is the coast, including Hell's Mouth and Deadman's Cove. The coast is followed by the South West Coast Path. As well as Camborne itself, the parish also includes a number of hamlets.

Camborne was formerly one of the most significant tin-mining areas in the world.

== Geography ==
Camborne forms the western part of a loose conurbation which stretches to Redruth, 3 miles (5 km) to the east. At the 2011 census, the Office for National Statistics defined Camborne to be part of what it called the Redruth built-up area, which had a population of 42,690, making it the largest built-up area in Cornwall. Cornwall Council similarly defined what it called "Camborne/Pool/Redruth", which had a population of 55,400 in 2011. Following a change in methodology for the 2021 census, Camborne is now considered a separate built-up area by the Office for National Statistics, with a population of 20,450.

The Camborne and Redruth area lies on the northern side of the Carn Brea/Carnmenellis granite upland which slopes northwards to the sea. The two towns are served by the A30 road, which now bypasses both towns to the north. The former route of the road through the towns (parts of which are now numbered the A3047) was turnpiked in 1839. The villages along the turnpike road between Camborne and Redruth were (from the west) Roskear, Tuckingmill, Pool and Illogan Highway.

Running from south to north are a number of small streams with narrow river valleys which have been deeply cut following centuries of tin streaming and other industrial processes. An example is the Red River valley which crosses the A3047 at Tuckingmill. The A30 forms a boundary between the urban area and the agricultural land to the north.

As well as the town itself, the civil parish includes surrounding rural areas and several hamlets or small villages, including Barripper, Bolenowe, Kehelland, Reskadinnick, Penponds, and Troon. The northern boundary of the parish is the coast.

=== Climate ===
Camborne has an oceanic climate typical of Cornwall with particularly narrow temperature ranges even by British standards. The absence of a large landmass nearby means that warm air from the continent gets cooled down over the sea in summer. In winter, cold air masses get moderated by the same effect. Rainfall is frequent all year due to moist air from the Gulf Stream.

Due to its mild maritime location, Camborne only averages 7.4 frosts per year, and frosts are rarely severe.

The highest temperature recorded in Camborne was 30.4 °C (86.7 °F) on 18 July 2022, and again on 12 August 2022. The lowest temperature ever recorded was −9.4 °C (15.1 °F) on 13 January 1987.

Climate data for Camborne (1991–2020 normals, extremes 1973–present)
Month	Jan	Feb	Mar	Apr	May	Jun	Jul	Aug	Sep	Oct	Nov	Dec	Year
Record high °C (°F)	15.5 (59.9)	16.0 (60.8)	18.5 (65.3)	22.3 (72.1)	30.1 (86.2)	27.7 (81.9)	30.4 (86.7)	30.4 (86.7)	27.1 (80.8)	23.8 (74.8)	17.0 (62.6)	15.3 (59.5)	30.4 (86.7)
Mean daily maximum °C (°F)	9.2 (48.6)	9.2 (48.6)	10.2 (50.4)	12.1 (53.8)	14.5 (58.1)	16.9 (62.4)	18.7 (65.7)	19.0 (66.2)	17.5 (63.5)	14.6 (58.3)	11.8 (53.2)	9.9 (49.8)	13.7 (56.7)
Daily mean °C (°F)	7.1 (44.8)	6.9 (44.4)	7.8 (46.0)	9.4 (48.9)	11.7 (53.1)	14.1 (57.4)	16.0 (60.8)	16.2 (61.2)	14.8 (58.6)	12.3 (54.1)	9.6 (49.3)	7.8 (46.0)	11.1 (52.0)
Mean daily minimum °C (°F)	4.9 (40.8)	4.6 (40.3)	5.4 (41.7)	6.6 (43.9)	8.8 (47.8)	11.3 (52.3)	13.2 (55.8)	13.4 (56.1)	12.0 (53.6)	10.0 (50.0)	7.4 (45.3)	5.6 (42.1)	8.6 (47.5)
Record low °C (°F)	−9.4 (15.1)	−6.8 (19.8)	−5.2 (22.6)	−2.3 (27.9)	0.3 (32.5)	4.8 (40.6)	7.2 (45.0)	7.4 (45.3)	4.8 (40.6)	−0.3 (31.5)	−3.8 (25.2)	−4.7 (23.5)	−9.4 (15.1)
Average precipitation mm (inches)	120.6 (4.75)	94.6 (3.72)	71.8 (2.83)	72.8 (2.87)	61.2 (2.41)	62.9 (2.48)	69.0 (2.72)	78.5 (3.09)	77.5 (3.05)	111.2 (4.38)	129.8 (5.11)	126.1 (4.96)	1,075.8 (42.35)
Average precipitation days (≥ 1.0 mm)	16.6	13.6	12.1	11.6	9.8	9.5	9.8	11.4	11.4	15.0	17.5	17.0	155.3
Mean monthly sunshine hours	61.1	84.5	125.3	187.5	216.2	214.6	198.9	187.2	159.7	111.6	70.2	55.4	1,672.1
Source 1: Met Office
Source 2: Starlings Roost Weather

The UK Met Office operate an Upper Air Station in Camborne.

== History ==
=== Early history ===
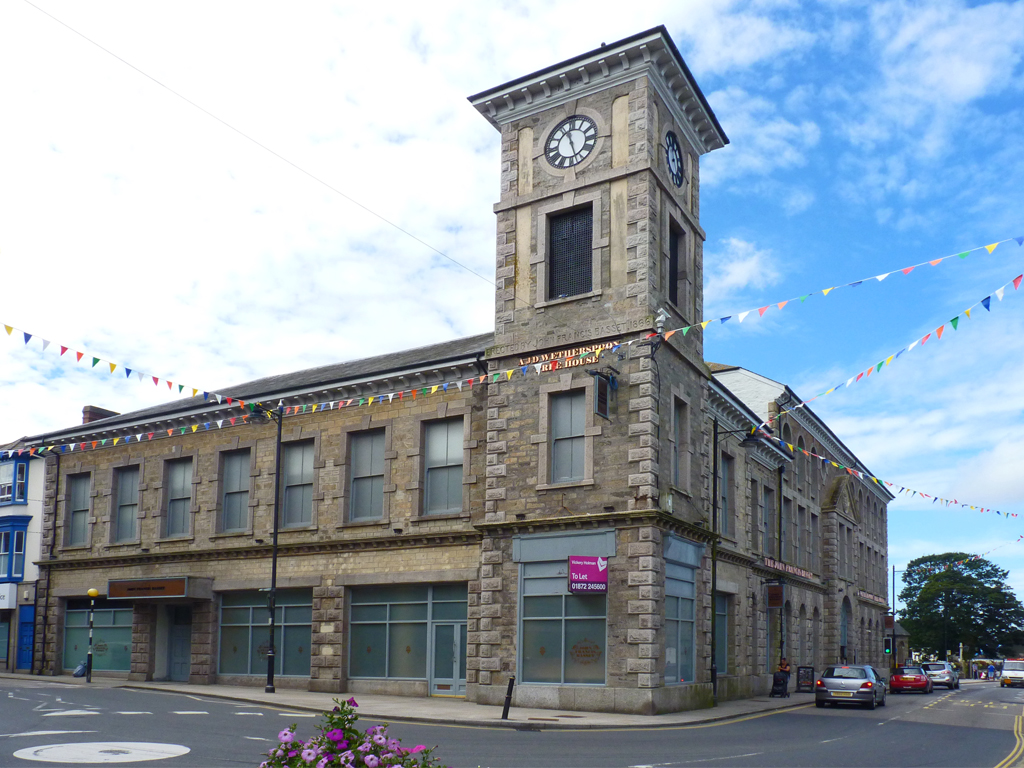
The Market House

The first mention of the medieval Camborne churchtown is in 1181 although in 1931 the ruins of a probable Romano-British villa were found at Magor Farm, Illogan, near Camborne, and excavated that year under the guidance of the Royal Institution of Cornwall.

There are also early Christian sites such as an inscribed altar stone, (now in the Church of St Martin and St Meriadoc), and dated to the 10th or 11th centuries, which attests to the existence of a settlement then.

Langdon (1896) records seven stone crosses in the parish of which two are at Pendarves. By the late Middle Ages manorial holdings developed in the surrounding area, and church-paths linked the churchtown to the outlying hamlets. Cornish medieval mystery plays were held in a playing place and the churchyard is said to have had a pilgrimage chapel and holy well. John Norden visited in 1584 and described Camborne as "A churche standinge among the barrayne hills". At this time there would have been moors and rough grazing as well as small fields in the surrounding countryside.

By 1708 Camborne had rights to hold markets and three fairs a year. A sign of increasing industrial activity and increasing industrial population is the first chapel built in 1806 and the development of a local Methodist community. In 1823 the population was around 2,000 and in 1841 it was 4,377, with 75 smiths recorded and over two-thirds of the working population employed in the mining industry. In the expanding town gasworks were opened in 1834, the Hayle Railway was built (1834–37) and Holmans opened a small foundry in 1839. The current Market House was completed in 1866.

Camborne was connected to the electric telegraph network in 1863 when the Electric and International Telegraph Company opened stations at Truro, Redruth, Penzance, Camborne, Liskard and St Austell.

=== Mining ===
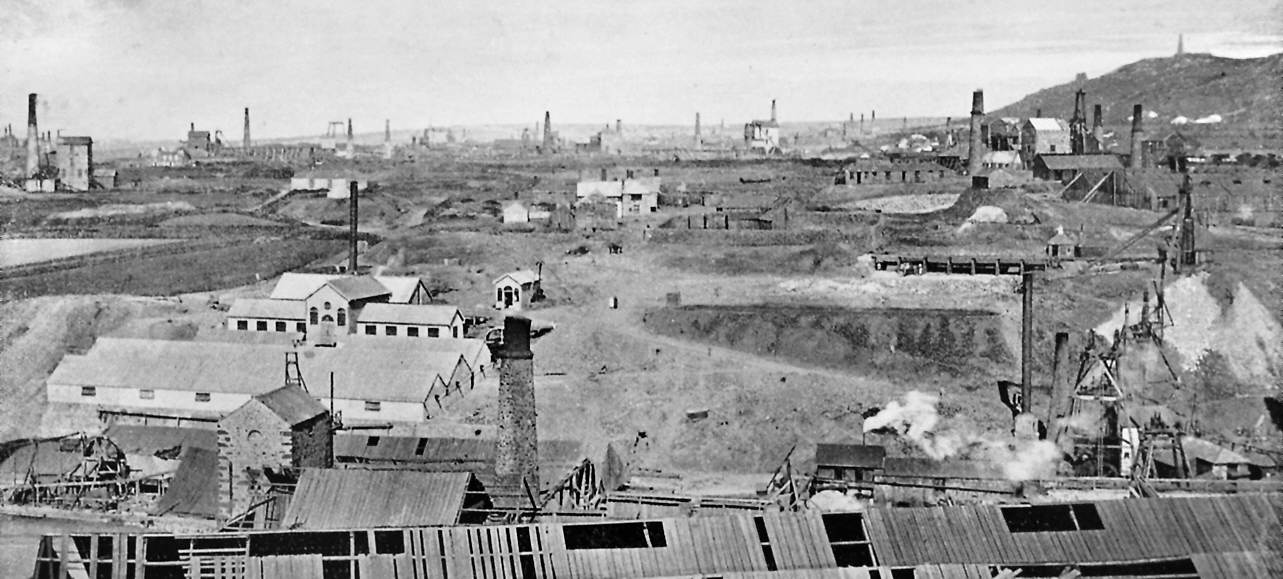
View east from Dolcoath Mine, 1893

Mining is first recorded locally in the 1400s with early exploitation of the small streams cutting through the mineralised area and from shallow mines following lodes. Adit mining was first recorded in the 16th century. The town is best known as a centre for the former Cornish tin and copper mining industry, having its working heyday during the later 18th and early 19th centuries. Camborne was just a village until transformed by the mining boom which began in the late 18th century and saw the Camborne and Redruth district become the "richest square mile in the old world".

As the economic recession of the 1870s led to the first years of mining decline in Camborne, social tensions mounted. In October 1873 thousands of miners, aided and abetted by the townspeople, rioted against a hated, authoritarian police force. One of the greatest shows of mining defiance in Cornish history left the Town Hall vandalised, the Police Station ransacked, and the estimated fifty constables present in the town beaten and scattered. The militia were called in from Plymouth to quell the insurrection, and the Home Secretary, Robert Lowe, asked to be kept informed of events. The Camborne riots were reported in the national newspapers and Sir Colman Rashleigh, JP for Cornwall, had to address the Grand Jury regarding the tumult. The entire Camborne police force was found to be at fault and either removed from duty or transferred as a result. No rioter was ever convicted.

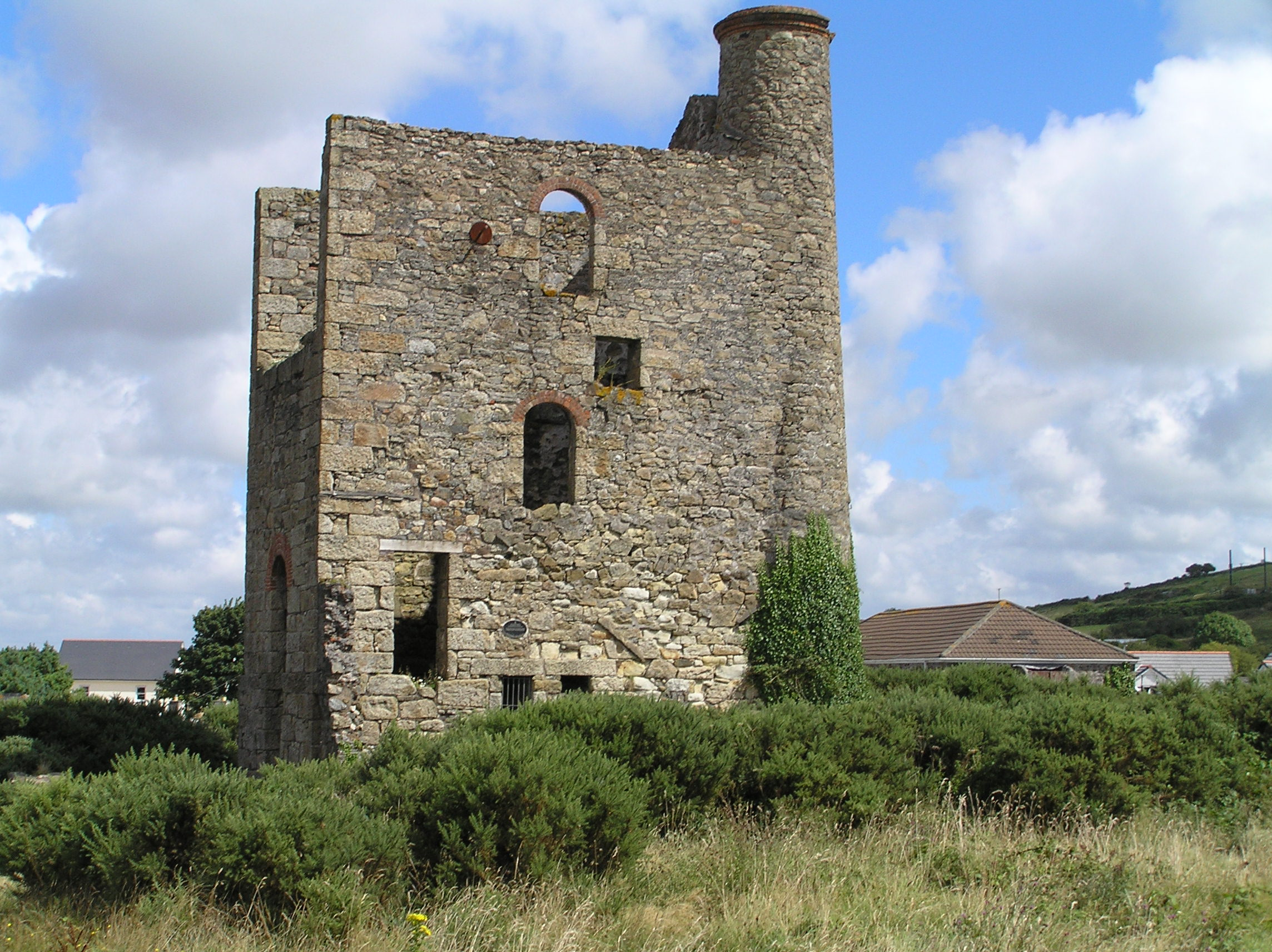
Harriets Pumping Engine house, part of Dolcoath Mine, built in 1860

Dolcoath Mine, (English: Old Ground Mine), the 'Queen of Cornish Mines' was, at a depth of 3,500 feet (1,100 m), for many years the deepest mine in the world, not to mention one of the oldest before its closure in 1921. The last working tin mine in Europe, South Crofty, which closed in 1998, is also to be found in Camborne.

==== Mining related ====
Holmans Rock Drill from 1955 (taken from the 55 vol. of CSM Magazine)

Apart from the mines themselves, Camborne was also home to many important related industries, including the once world-renowned foundry of Holman Bros Ltd (CompAir). Holmans, a family business founded in 1801, was for generations, Camborne's, and indeed Cornwall's largest manufacturer of industrial equipment, even making the famous Sten submachine gun for a stint during the Second World War. The Holman Projector was used by the Royal Navy. At its height Holmans was spread over three sites within Camborne, employing some three and half thousand men. Despite Britain's industrial decline, Compair Holmans Camborne factory finally closed in 2003.

A modest quantity of South Crofty tin was purchased by a local enterprise and this gradually dwindling stock is used to make specialist tin jewellery, branded as the South Crofty Collection. Tin originally mined at South Crofty was used to form the bronze medals awarded in the 2012 London Olympics.

==== Camborne School of Mines ====
Because of the prior importance of metal mining to the Cornish economy, the Camborne School of Mines (CSM) developed as the only specialist hard rock education establishment in the United Kingdom, until the Royal School of Mines was established in 1851. Plans for the school were laid out in 1829, leading to the current school in 1888. It now forms part of the University of Exeter; it moved to the university's Tremough campus (now known as Penryn Campus) in 2004.

=== Steam locomotion ===
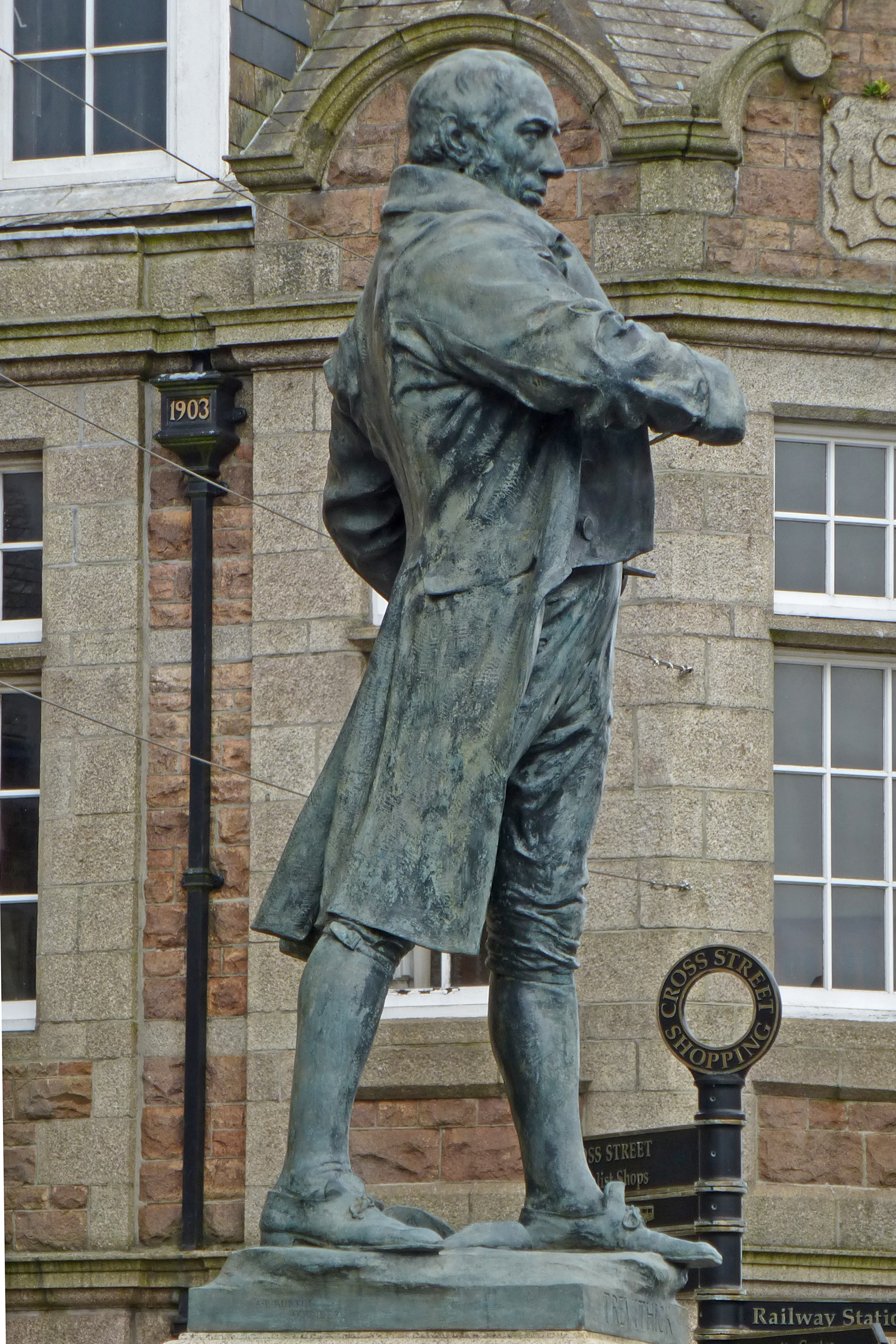
Statue of Richard Trevithick outside Camborne Library

On Christmas Eve 1801, the Puffing Devil—a steam-powered road locomotive built by Camborne engineer Richard Trevithick—made its way up Camborne Hill in Cornwall. It was the world's first self-propelled passenger carrying vehicle. The events have been turned into a local song:

Going up Camborne Hill, coming down,
Going up Camborne Hill, coming down,
The horses stood still,
The wheels turn around,
Going up Camborne Hill, coming down.

== Cornish language ==
The Cornish language was the language of the area around Camborne until the beginning of the 18th century and it is recorded that everyone living west of Truro spoke Cornish in 1644. Nicholas Boson wrote that Cornish was spoken as far east as Redruth and Falmouth circa 1700. In 1700 the pioneering Celtic linguist Edward Lhuyd came to Cornwall to study the language and visited Camborne, detailing many aspects of the parish.

One of the most important surviving works of medieval Cornish literature is Beunans Meriasek, the Life of St Meriadoc the patron saint of Camborne. In the 19th century the nickname for Camborne people was Mera-jacks, or Merry-geeks, and those who washed in St Meriasek's well were called Merrasicks, Merrasickers, Moragicks or Mearagaks.

In the 20th century several Cornish words and phrases were noted as still in use amongst the inhabitants of Camborne. These include taw tavas (silent tongue) and allycumpoester (all in order).

Although a limited amount of Cornish was taught in some schools in west Cornwall during the 19th and early 20th centuries the first school to properly dedicate itself to teaching revived Cornish was the Mount Pleasant House school run by E. G. Retallack Hooper in the post-Second World War period. By 1984 Cornish was being taught in Troon and Camborne primary schools as well as Camborne secondary school and there was a Cornish language playgroup. In 2000 Roskear and Weeth schools were teaching Cornish.

In the 2011 United Kingdom census, although there was no specific Cornish language question, thirty people living in the parish of Camborne declared that Cornish was their main language at home, thirteen in Troon and Beacon.

== Governance ==
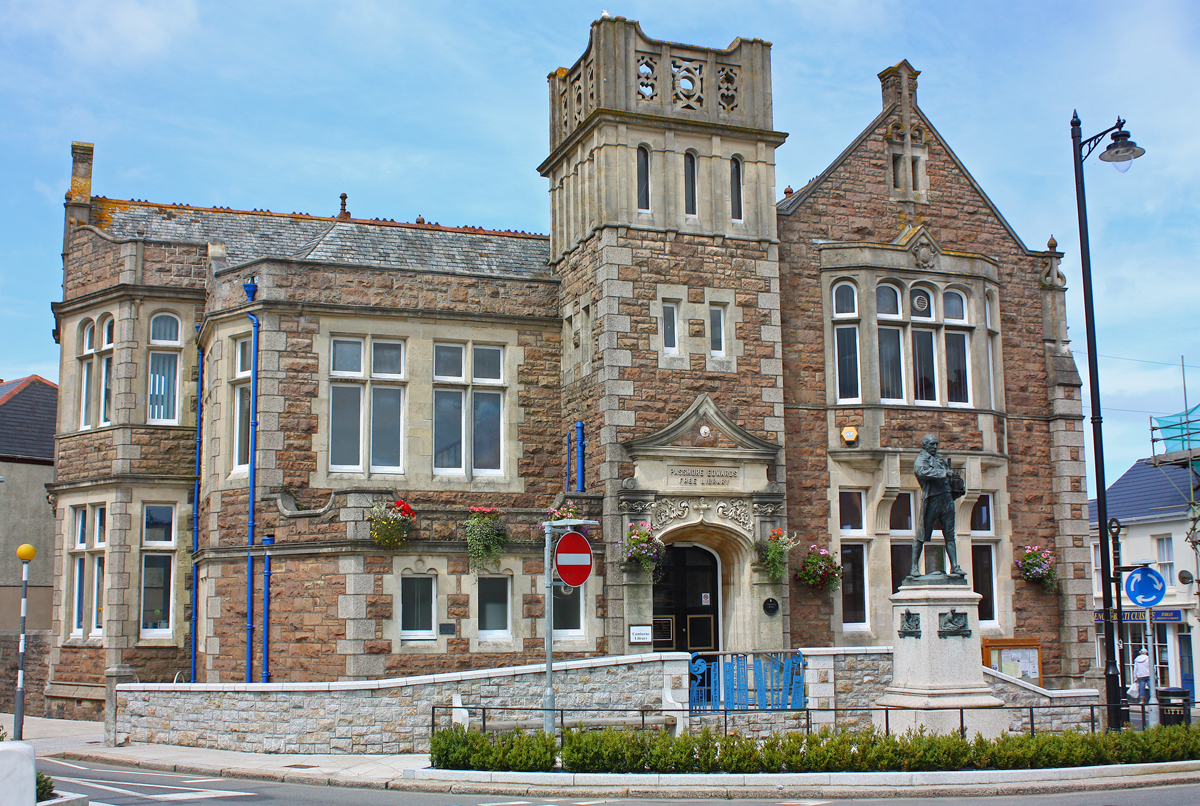
Passmore Edwards Building: Houses the town's library and the town council's headquarters

There are two tiers of local government covering Camborne, at parish (town) and unitary authority level: Camborne Town Council and Cornwall Council. The town council is based at the Passmore Edwards Building at The Cross. The building was completed in 1895, funded by philanthropist John Passmore Edwards, and also serves as the town's library.

Since the 2010 general election the town has formed part of the Camborne and Redruth constituency. The seat was won at the 2024 general election by Perran Moon of the Labour Party.

=== Administrative history ===
Camborne was an ancient parish in the Penwith Hundred of Cornwall. In 1873 the parish was made a local government district, administered by an elected local board. The local board's seal depicted a mine shaft and engine house with the date 1873 and the legend "The Local Board for the District of Camborne".

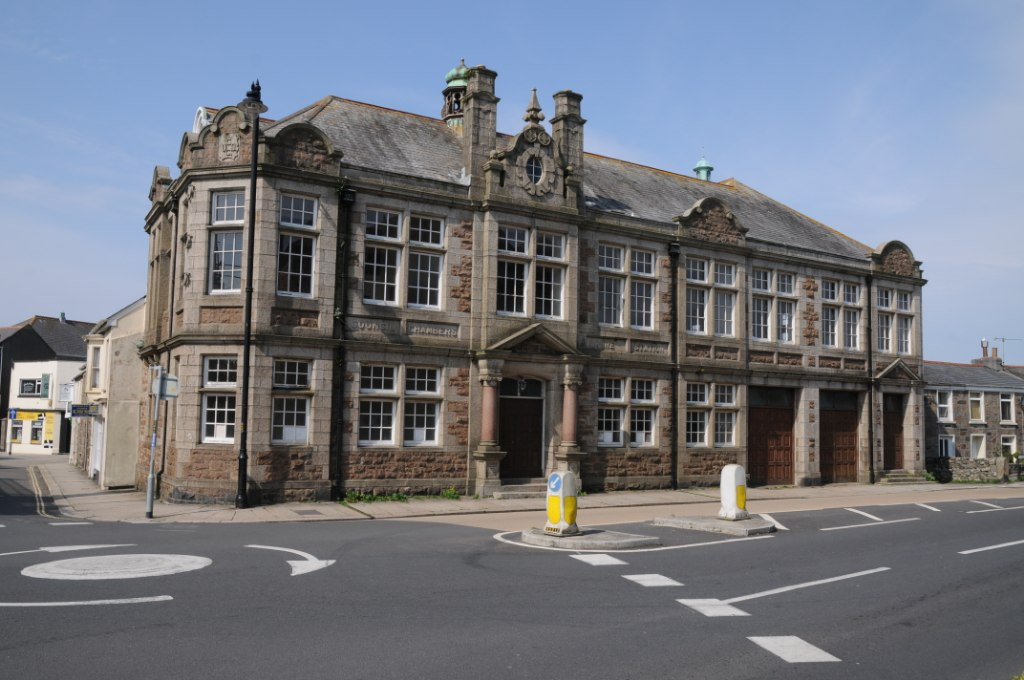
Old Council Offices, Trevenson Street: Urban district council's headquarters 1903–1946

Such local government districts were reconstituted as urban districts under the Local Government Act 1894. Camborne Urban District Council subsequently commissioned the Council Offices on Trevenson Street to serve as its headquarters, which was completed in 1903 and also included a fire station for the town.

Camborne Urban District was abolished in 1934. The area was then merged with the abolished urban district of Redruth, the parish of Illogan and parts of the parishes of Gwennap and Wendron to become the new Camborne–Redruth Urban District. Camborne-Redruth Urban District Council was initially based at the former Camborne Urban District Council's offices on Trevenson Street. In 1946 the council moved a short distance to a large converted house called Veor on South Terrace in Camborne.

Camborne–Redruth Urban District was abolished in 1974 under the Local Government Act 1972, when the area became part of the Kerrier district.

The area of the pre-1974 Camborne-Redruth Urban District became an unparished area at the time of the 1974 reforms. Eight new civil parishes were subsequently created in 1985 covering the area of the former urban district, including one called Camborne. The new parish council adopted the name Camborne Town Council.

Kerrier district was in turn abolished in 2009. Cornwall County Council then took on district-level functions, making it a unitary authority, and was renamed Cornwall Council.

== Church history ==
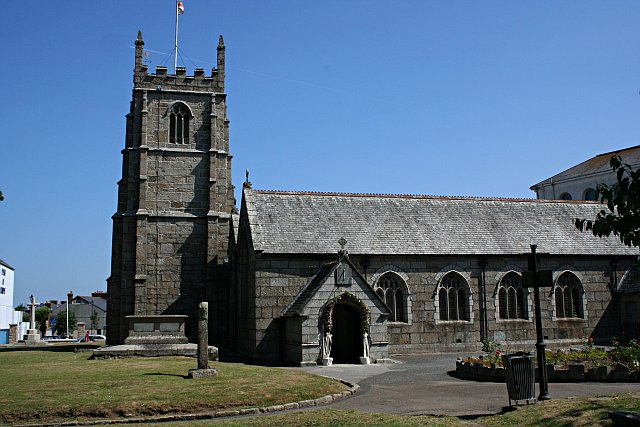
Camborne Parish Church

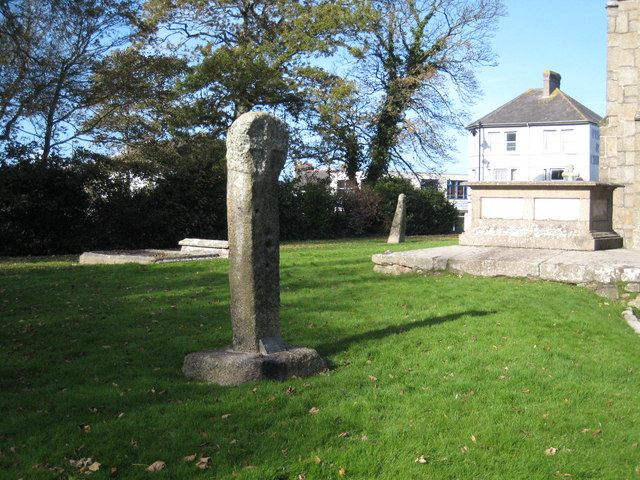
Two ancient crosses in the grounds of Camborne Parish Church

Camborne's parish church is dedicated to St Martin and St Meriadoc: it is entirely of granite, of 15th century date, but incorporating earlier structural features, including a Norman chevron stone in the west wall of the north aisle found in 2009 and is listed Grade I. St Martin was added to the original dedication to St Meriadoc in the 15th century. There is a western tower about 60 feet high containing eight bells (with a clock before 1882) and the aisles are identical in design: the building was gutted and restored in 1861-62 and an outer south aisle was added in 1878–79 to a design by James Piers St Aubyn. The church was re-opened on 7 August 1879 by Edward Benson, the Bishop of Truro.

An inscribed altar stone found at Chapel Ia, Troon (now set up as the Lady Chapel altar in the parish church), and dated to the 10th or 11th centuries, attests to the existence of a settlement then. It is inscribed 'Leuiut iusit hec altare pro anima sua'. The chapel of St Ia was recorded in 1429 and a holy well was nearby. The site was called Fenton-ear (i.e. the well of Ia). The stone is very similar to one now used as the mensa of the Lady Chapel altar at Treslothan Parish Church, formerly used from c. 1841 to 1955 as the base for a sundial in the grounds of Pendarves House.

Camborne churchyard contains a number of crosses collected from nearby sites: the finest is one found in a well at Crane in 1896 but already known from William Borlase's account of it when it was at Fenton-ear. Arthur Langdon (1896) records six crosses in the parish, including two at Pendarves, two at Trevu and one outside the institute. There is a cross at Camborne Park Recreation Ground.

Two other chapels are known to have existed in the medieval period: one not far from the parish church was dedicated to Our Lady and St Anne and one at Menadarva (derived from Merther-Derwa) was one of Celtic origin dedicated to St Derwa, Virgin, but mentioned in 1429.

== Transport ==
=== Road ===
The A30 trunk road now by-passes the town around its northern edge. The old A30 through the town has become the A3047.

=== Train ===
The railway station is a half-mile south from the town centre, with a level crossing and footbridge at its eastern end. Camborne railway station used to be famous for its short platforms, which meant that passengers on main line services between London Paddington and Penzance could only board and alight from certain carriages. Partly because of this not all services stopped at Camborne, preferring nearby Redruth (which is also classed by Great Western Railway (GWR) as a short station stop). The platforms have been upgraded but the memory lives on, again partly in stories by the comedian Jethro. Camborne railway station is served by CrossCountry and GWR trains. CrossCountry provide one service in each direction from Plymouth-Penzance.

=== Trams ===
Camborne was, for a quarter of a century, one of the termini of Cornwall's only tram service. This system was opened in November 1902 and ran a regular service to Redruth until it closed in September 1927.

== Sport ==
Camborne RFC were established in 1878 and are one of the most famous clubs in Cornwall, having produced numerous Cornwall players over the years. In 1987 Camborne were the highest placed Cornish club in the newly formed National leagues when they entered at 1987–88 Courage Area League South (equivalent to National League 2 South today). Camborne is one of the grounds used by the Cornish rugby team and has hosted many notable international sides including the New Zealand 'All Blacks' in 1905, 1924 and 1953, Australia in 1908, 1947 and 1967, South Africa 1960, United States 1977 and numerous other touring sides such as the South African Barbarians and Canterbury (NZ). Since 2006 it was agreed to ground share the Recreation Ground with local Division One team the Cornish Pirates and the ground has undergone major refurbishment including a new stand for the 2007–08 and 2008–09 seasons.

Notable local rugby players include Josh Matavesi 18-year-old debut for Fiji against Scotland in 2010, his younger brother Sam, debut against Canada in 2013.

=== Cornish wrestling ===
Camborne has been a major centre for Cornish wrestling for many centuries. There were various venues where tournaments were held including: the field adjoining the Pendarves Arms Inn at Beacon, the Unicorn Inn, the White Hart Inn and the recreation ground. There were various local cups that were competed for including the "Mrs Bramble Cup", the "Allen Cup" and the "Moreing Cup".

Sam Ham (1880–1946), was born in Condurrow near Camborne, was the 1910 middleweight Cornish wrestling champion of South Africa.

See Cornish wrestling in Roskear and Cornish wrestling in Pool.

== Education ==
A Church of England National School was built in College Street in 1844 (replaced by a newer building further up the street towards the parish church in 1896—now demolished); in the following year a school for four hundred boys was opened in the Centenary Methodist Chapel and in 1847 the Basset Road British (Methodist) School was opened. A School of Mines started in 1872 with the Basset family paying for chemistry laboratories. The town now has a number of schools covering all age ranges, notably the main secondary school, Camborne Science and International Academy (founded in 1956 as Treswithian School), and a campus of Cornwall College.

A private girls' school was founded in 1877 as Redbrook College with about 20 pupils. It became a state grammar school for girls in 1908 as Camborne Grammar School, and merged with Treswithian School in the change to comprehensive education in the 1970s.

== Twinning ==
Camborne is twinned with two places: Santez-Anna-Wened in Brittany, France, and Pachuca, Hidalgo in Mexico. Camborne was twinned with Pachuca at a ceremony in Mexico on 3 July 2008.

The town name inspired the name of Camborne, New Zealand, a seaside suburb of Porirua City developed by an investment company headed by an Arthur Cornish. Most of its street names are of Cornish origin. It adjoins the suburb of Plimmerton.

== Culture ==
=== Music ===
- Camborne Town Band has been contesting music records from the late 19th century until the present day. It has performed on BBC Radio.
- Holman Climax Male Voice Choir, based in Camborne, was formed in 1940 by Edgar S. Kessell (1910–1981).

=== Literature and film ===
- Alan M. Kent's 2005 novel Proper job, Charlie Curnow! is set in and around the Trelawney Estate, a fictional housing estate on the outskirts of Camborne.
- Zoie Palmer is an actress who was born in Camborne.

== Notable people ==
Francis Dyke Acland, c. 1908

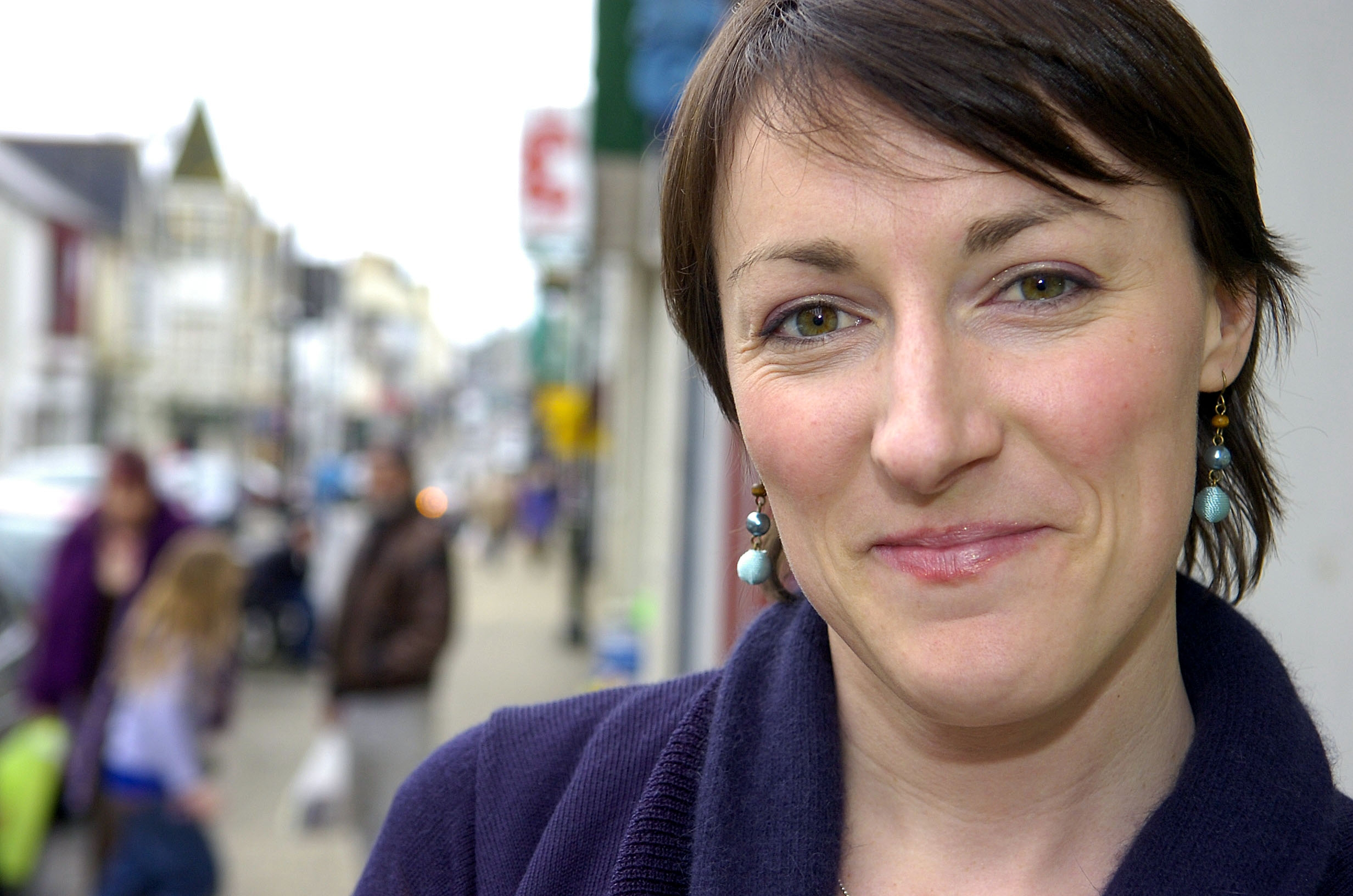
Julia Goldsworthy, 2008

- William Paynter (1637–1716), clergyman and Vice-Chancellor of Oxford University
- Andrew Vivian (1759–1842), mechanical engineer, inventor, and mine captain of the Dolcoath mine
- James Trevenen (1760–1790), an officer in the Royal Navy and the Imperial Russian Navy
- Arthur Woolf (1766–1837), engineer, invented a high-pressure compound steam engine
- Joshua Cristall (1767–1847), painter and president of the Royal Watercolour Society
- Samuel Paynter (1774–1844), builder operated in the City of London
- George Smith (1800–1868), businessman, historian and theologian; worked on the Methodist conference
- Francis Trevithick (1812–1877), one of the first locomotive engineers of the London and North Western Railway (LNWR)
- John Harris (1820–1884), poet and fellow of the Royal Historical Society
- Mark Guy Pearse (1842–1930), a Cornish Methodist preacher, lecturer, author and drinker
- Annie Carvosso (1861–1932), activist and social reformer
- Henry Charles Tonking (1863–1926), organist, played at the Royal Aquarium, and, from 1888, at the Covent Garden Opera
- Sir Francis Dyke Acland, 14th Baronet (1874–1939), politician, MP from 1906 to 1939, Foreign Secretary 1911–1915 and local MP, 1910 to 1922
- Commander Sir Peter Agnew, 1st Baronet (1900–1990) was Royal Navy officer and politician, local MP from 1931 to 1950
- Nigel Tangye (1909–1988), a British airman, novelist, journalist and writer; lived and died locally
- Major Grahame Vivian (1919–2015), Army officer who won the Military Cross in Burma in 1944 and again in Malaya in 1956
- Charles Thomas (1928–2016), historian and archaeologist; Bard of the Cornish Gorseth in 1953
- Judith Bailey (1941–2025), clarinettist, composer and conductor, associate of the Royal Academy of Music
- Vicki Young (Deputy Political Editor at the BBC and presenter) (born 1971)
- Julia Goldsworthy (born 1978), politician and local MP from 2005 until 2010
- Christopher Bond (born 1992), composer noted for his brass band compositions

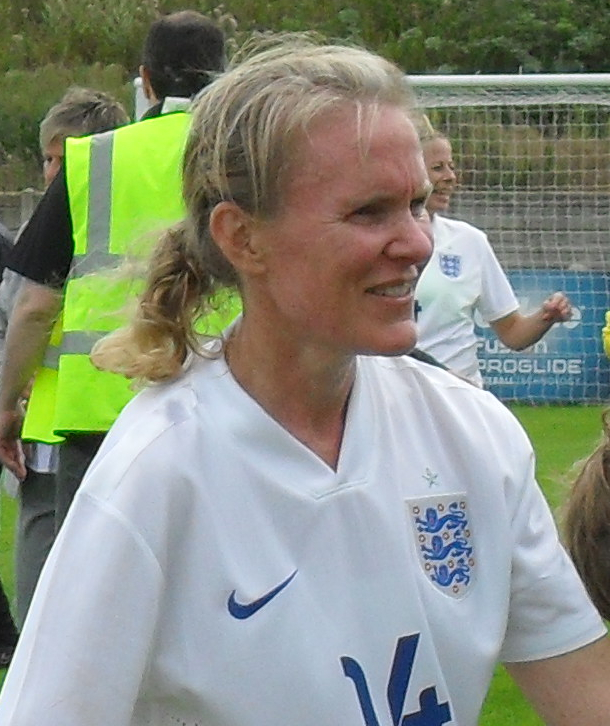
Sian Williams, 2015

=== Sport ===
- Ray Weeks (1930–2013), cricketer who played 107 first-class cricket games for Warwickshire
- Sian Williams (born 1968), a former footballer who played 123 games for Arsenal W.F.C. and 20 for England women
- Joanna Thomas (1976–2020), a professional female bodybuilder, died locally
- Luke Charteris (born 1983), rugby union player who played about 250 games and 74 for Wales
- Josh Matavesi (born 1990), a rugby union player who has played over 400 games and 47 for Fiji
- Harry Hall (born 1997), professional golfer, plays on the PGA Tour
- Lewis Goldsworthy (born 2001), an English cricketer who has played 32 first-class cricket games for Somerset
