= Kerrier Rural District =

Former local government area in the UK

Coordinates: 50.149°N 5.182°W

Kerrier Rural District was a local government division of Cornwall in England, UK, between 1934 and 1974. The rural district was created in 1934 through the abolition of East Kerrier Rural District, Helston Rural District and Redruth Rural District.

In 1974 the district was abolished under the Local Government Act 1972, forming part of the new Kerrier district.

== Civil parishes ==
The civil parishes within the district were:

- Breage
- Budock
- Constantine
- Crowan
- Cury
- Germoe
- Grade–Ruan
- Gunwalloe
- Gweek
- Landewednack
- Mabe
- Manaccan
- Mawgan-in-Meneage
- Mawnan
- Mullion
- Sithney
- St Anthony-in-Meneage
- St Gluvias
- St Keverne
- St Martin-in-Meneage
- Stithians
- Wendron
