= Wadebridge Rural District =

Former local government area in the UK

Coordinates: 50.481°N 4.820°W

Wadebridge Rural District was a local government division of Cornwall in England, UK, between 1934 and 1968. Established under the Local Government Act 1929, the rural district was formed from the abolished districts of Bodmin Rural District, St Columb Major Rural District and Wadebridge Urban District. In 1968 Wadebridge Rural District was abolished, creating Wadebridge and Padstow Rural District.
