= West Penwith Rural District =

Former local government area in the UK

- History
  - Origin: Hayle Urban District *Ludgvan Urban District *Madron Urban District *Paul Urban District *Phillack Urban District *Redruth Rural District
  - Created: 1894
  - Abolished: 1974
  - Succeeded by: Penwith District
- Status: Rural district
- Government: Rural District Council
  - HQ: Penzance

West Penwith Rural District was a rural district in Cornwall, England, United Kingdom, from 1894 to 1974. It was enlarged in 1934 by the abolition of Hayle, Ludgvan, Madron, Paul, and Phillack urban districts, and also took in part of the disbanded Redruth Rural District.

In 1974 it was abolished under the Local Government Act 1972, to form part of the new Penwith district.

From 1992 the name was used for the smallest Environmentally Sensitive Area (ESA) in England. The ESA designation covers 90 square kilometres (35 sq mi) in the area formerly covered by the rural district, but there is no relationship between the two.

== Civil parishes ==
The civil parishes within the district were:

- Gwinear–Gwithian
- Hayle
- Ludgvan
- Madron
- Marazion
- Morvah
- Paul
- Perranuthnoe
- Sancreed
- Sennen
- St Buryan
- St Erth
- St Hilary
- St Levan
- St Michael's Mount
- Towednack
- Zennor

== See also ==
- Penwith
