= Kerrier =

Former non-metropolitan district in Cornwall, England

Kerrier District Ranndir Keryer
- Shown within Cornwall
- Population
  - 1973: 78,080
  - 2001: 92,536
- History
  - Preceded by: Borough of Helston; Camborne-Redruth Urban District; Kerrier Rural District
  - Created: 1 April 1974
  - Abolished: 1 April 2009
  - Succeeded by: Cornwall unitary authority
- Status: District
- ONS code: 15UD
- Government: District council
  - HQ: Camborne
- Subdivisions
  - Type: Civil parishes

Kerrier (Cornish: Keryer) was a local government district in Cornwall, England, United Kingdom. It was the most southerly district in the United Kingdom, other than the Isles of Scilly. Its council was based in Camborne (50.214°N 5.297°W). Other towns in the district included Redruth and Helston. The district also contained the Lizard Peninsula.

Kerrier was named after one of the ancient administrative Hundreds of Cornwall, Kerrier, which covered broadly the same area, but did not have a coast on the north.

The district was formed on 1 April 1974, as a merger of the borough of Helston, the urban district of Camborne-Redruth and Kerrier Rural District. On 25 July 2007, Cornwall County Council's bid for unitary authority status was accepted by the government. Kerrier District Council was abolished on 1 April 2009 as part of structural changes to local government in England.

Cornish musician Luke Vibert has released a number of albums and singles under the alias Kerrier District, as a nod to New York musicians Metro Area and a tribute to the place where he grew up.

== Parishes ==
The district contained the parishes of:

- Breage, Budock
- Camborne, Carharrack, Carn Brea, Constantine, Crowan, Cury
- Germoe, Grade-Ruan, Gunwalloe, Gweek
- Helston
- Illogan
- Landewednack, Lanner
- Mabe, Manaccan, Mawgan-in-Meneage, Mawnan, Mullion
- Porthleven, Portreath
- Redruth
- Sithney, St Anthony-in-Meneage, St Day, St Gluvias, St Keverne, St Martin-in-Meneage, Stithians
- Wendron

== See also ==
- Kerrier District Council elections
