= Truro Rural District =

Former local government area in the UK

Coordinates: 50.245°N 4.932°W

Truro Rural District was a local government division of Cornwall in England, UK, between 1894 and 1974. Established under the Local Government Act 1894 in 1934, the rural district was enlarged by the abolition of East Kerrier Rural District, Redruth Rural District and St Columb Major Rural District, but was reduced to enlarge Truro Municipal Borough.

In 1974, the district was abolished under the Local Government Act 1972, forming part of the new Carrick district.

== Civil parishes ==
The civil parishes within the district were:

- Chacewater
- Cubert
- Cuby
- Feock
- Gerrans
- Gwennap
- Kea
- Kenwyn
- Ladock
- Mylor
- Perranarworthal
- Perranzabuloe
- Philleigh
- Probus
- Ruanlanihorne
- St Agnes
- St Allen
- St Clement
- St Erme
- St Just in Roseland
- St Michael Penkevil
- St Newlyn East
- Tregoney
- Veryan
