= Bodmin Rural District =

Former local government area in the UK

Coordinates: 50.522°N 4.712°W

Bodmin Rural District was a local government division of Cornwall in England, UK, between 1894 and 1934. Established under the Local Government Act 1894, the rural district was abolished in 1934 to create Wadebridge Rural District as well as enlarging Bodmin Municipal Borough, Liskeard Rural District, Lostwithiel Municipal Borough and St Austell Rural District.
