= St Columb Major Rural District =

Former district in Cornwall, United Kingdom

Coordinates: 50.466°N 4.937°W

St Columb Major Rural District was a local government division of Cornwall in England, UK, between 1894 and 1934. Established under the Local Government Act 1894, the rural district was abolished in 1934, enlarging Newquay Urban District, Padstow Urban District, St Austell Rural District and Truro Rural District, and creating Wadebridge Rural District.
