= Carrick, Cornwall =

Former local government district in Cornwall, England, United Kingdom

Coordinates: 50.264°N 5.054°W

Carrick District Ranndir Karrek
- Shown within Cornwall
- Population
  - 1973: 71,430
  - 2001: 87,861
- History
  - Preceded by: Municipal Borough of Truro; Municipal Borough of Falmouth; Municipal Borough of Penryn; Truro Rural District
  - Created: 1 April 1974
  - Abolished: 1 April 2009
  - Succeeded by: Cornwall unitary authority
- Status: District
- ONS code: 15UC
- Government: District council
  - HQ: Truro
- Subdivisions
  - Type: Civil parishes

Carrick (Cornish: Karrek) was a local government district in Cornwall, England, United Kingdom. Its district council was based in Truro.

The main centres of population, industry and commerce were the city of Truro and the towns of Falmouth/Penryn.

The district was created under the Local Government Act 1972, on 1 April 1974 by the merger of the municipal boroughs of Truro, Falmouth and Penryn, and the Truro Rural District.

It was named after the Carrick Roads, an inlet near Falmouth that the rivers Percuil, Penryn and Fal drain into.

The district was abolished as part of the 2009 structural changes to local government in England on 1 April 2009.

== Parishes ==
Carrick comprised the following 27 parishes:

- Chacewater, Cubert, Cuby
- Falmouth, Feock
- Gerrans, Gwennap
- Kea, Kenwyn
- Ladock
- Mylor
- Penryn, Perranarworthal, Perranzabuloe, Philleigh, Probus
- Ruan Lanihorne
- St Agnes, St Allen, St Clement, St Erme, St Just in Roseland, St Michael Penkevil, St Newlyn East
- Tregony, Truro
- Veryan

== See also ==
- Carrick District Council elections
