= St Michael Caerhays =

Village in Cornwall, England

Coordinates: 50.243°N 4.858°W

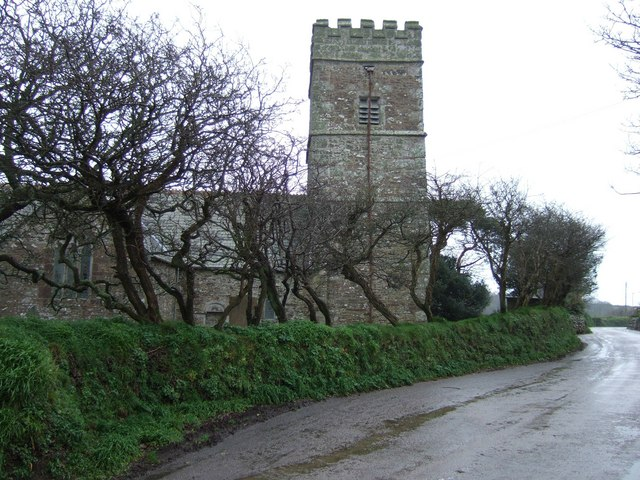
The church of St Michael Caerhays

St Michael Caerhays (Cornish: Lannvighal) is a civil parish and village in Cornwall, England, United Kingdom. The village is about seven miles (11 km) south-southwest of St Austell. The population as of the 2011 census was 96

St Michael Caerhays lies within the Cornwall Area of Outstanding Natural Beauty (AONB).

The ecclesiastical parish was a chapelry of St Stephen in Brannel until 1832. From the 16th century the Rectors of St Stephen resided here so the church of St Michael came to be regarded as the mother church. The church is Norman but the Lady Chapel was added in the 15th century by the Trevanions and it contains their monuments. Their home was on the site of Caerhayes Castle.

Caerhays Castle, a picturesque castellated mansion, is situated half-a-mile south of the village and was built by John Nash for J. B. Trevanion in 1808.

== Notable people ==
George Martin, (1864 – 1946), was a priest in the Church of England who gave up his living and went to Southwark, where he became known among the poor as the 'modern St Anthony'. He was rector of this parish 1893–99.

== Cornish wrestling ==
Cornish wrestling tournaments, for prizes, were held in Caerhays in the 1800s.

== See also ==
- Portholland
