= Camborne–Redruth Urban District =

Local government area in the UK, abolished 1974

Coordinates: 50.229°N 5.261°W

Camborne-Redruth
- Urban District
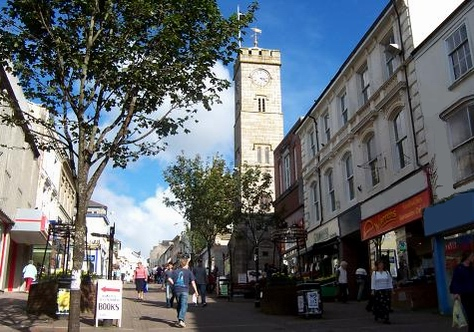
- Redruth, one of the district's two towns
- Population
  - 1961: 36,110
- History
  - Created: 1 April 1934; 91 years ago
  - Abolished: March 31, 1974; 51 years ago
  - Succeeded by: Kerrier
- Contained within
  - County: Cornwall

Camborne-Redruth was an urban district and civil parish in Cornwall, England, from 1934 to 1974. It was formed as a merger of the urban districts of Camborne and Redruth, the parish of Illogan, and parts of the parishes of Gwennap and Wendron. The towns of Camborne and Redruth are about 4 miles (6 km) apart and form a loose conurbation.

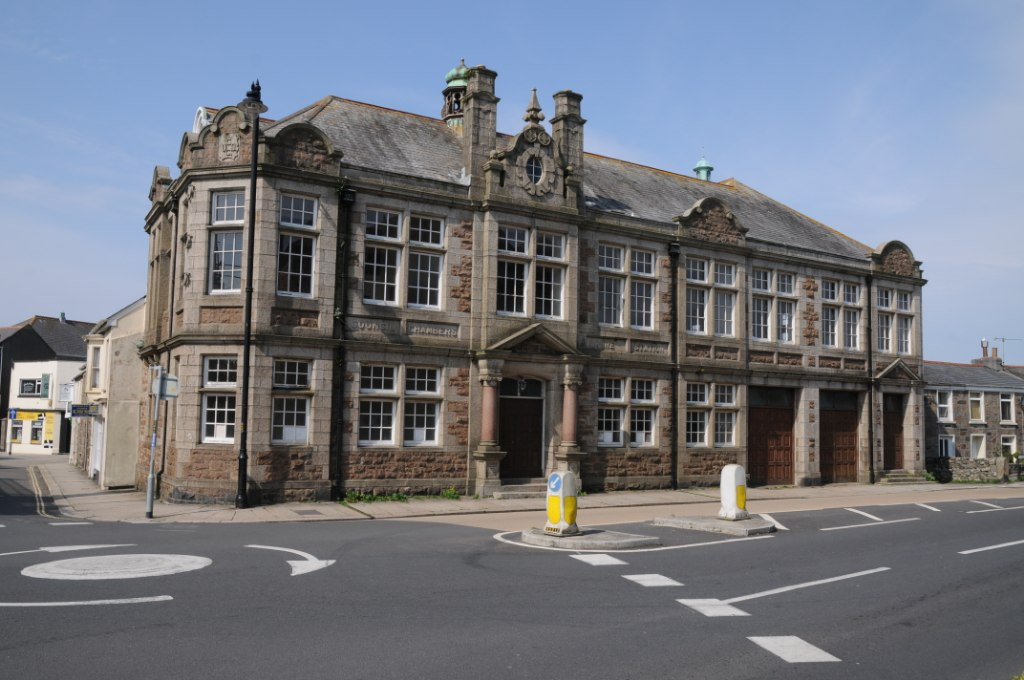
Old Council Offices, Camborne: Camborne-Redruth Urban District Council's headquarters until 1946

Camborne-Redruth Urban District Council was initially based at the former Camborne Urban District Council's offices on Trevenson Street. In 1946 the council moved a short distance to a large converted house called Veor on South Terrace in Camborne.

In 1961, Camborne-Redruth had a population of 36,110.

The urban district was abolished in 1974 under the Local Government Act 1972, when the area became part of the Kerrier district.

The area of the pre-1974 Camborne-Redruth Urban District became an unparished area at the time of the 1974 reforms. Eight new civil parishes were subsequently created in 1985 covering the area of the former urban district: Camborne, Carharrack, Carn Brea, Illogan, Lanner, Portreath, Redruth, and St Day.

== See also ==
- Camborne and Redruth (UK Parliament constituency)
