= Bayle Museum =

Museum in the East Riding of Yorkshire, England

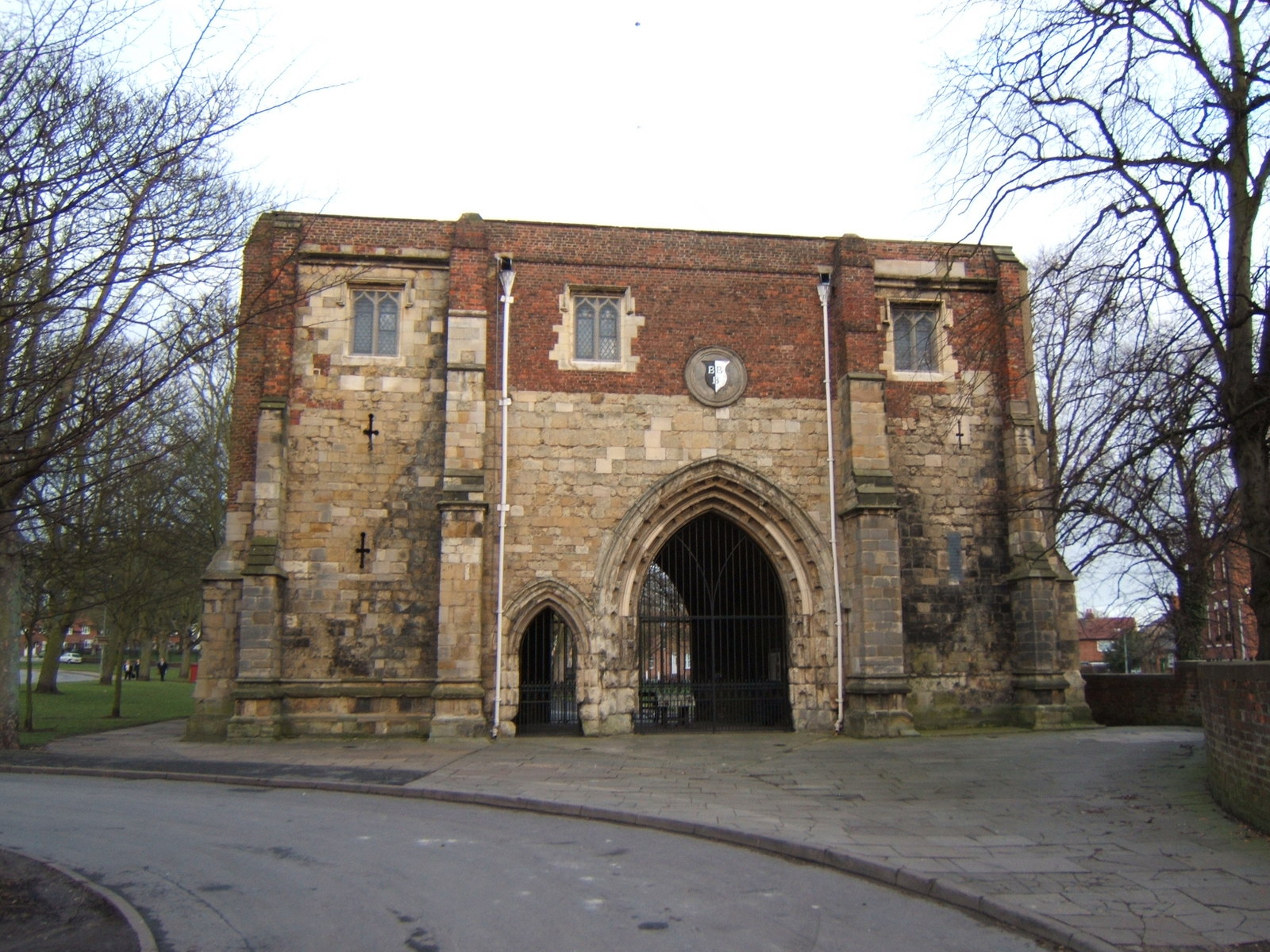
- View of the Bayle Gate building housing the museum
- Former name: Bayle Gate
- Location: Bridlington, East Riding of Yorkshire, England
- Coordinates: 54°05′36″N 0°12′13″W
- Type: Local museum
- Website: www.baylemuseum.co.uk

The Bayle Museum is a local museum located in Bridlington, England.

The building it occupies, Bayle Gate (akak The Bayle) was constructed in the 1100s and is a scheduled monument, although not much is known about its origins. The museum contains historical artefacts "showcasing Bridlington's illustrious history through interactive exhibitions". The building is Grade I listed.

== Etymology ==
The word bayle is derived from the French word baille, which means "enclosure" or "ward".

== History ==
Archaeological surveys that were done in the area have concluded that the original stonework of the structure dates back to the 12th century, when the building, it is thought, served as a gatehouse to a wooden castle built by William le Gros in 1143, although much remains unknown about the building's history before the early 14th century. In the 14th century the Bayle Gate was converted into a gatehouse to Bridlington Priory. The gatehouse housed a porter (who collected tolls for entrance to the priory markets) and an almoner (who distributed food and ale to the poor of Bridlington).

== Historical usage ==
Since the dissolution of the monasteries by Henry VIII, the Bayle Gate has seen many uses. These have included a prison, a court for the town, a schoolroom, a garrison for Napoleonic soldiers and a town hall.

== Modern usage ==
Today, the Bayle Museum is used as a museum and a meeting room for the Lords Feoffees, who administer a local charity.
