= RAF Bridlington =

Royal Air Force base in Yorkshire, England

RAF Bridlington
- Bridlington, East Riding of Yorkshire in England
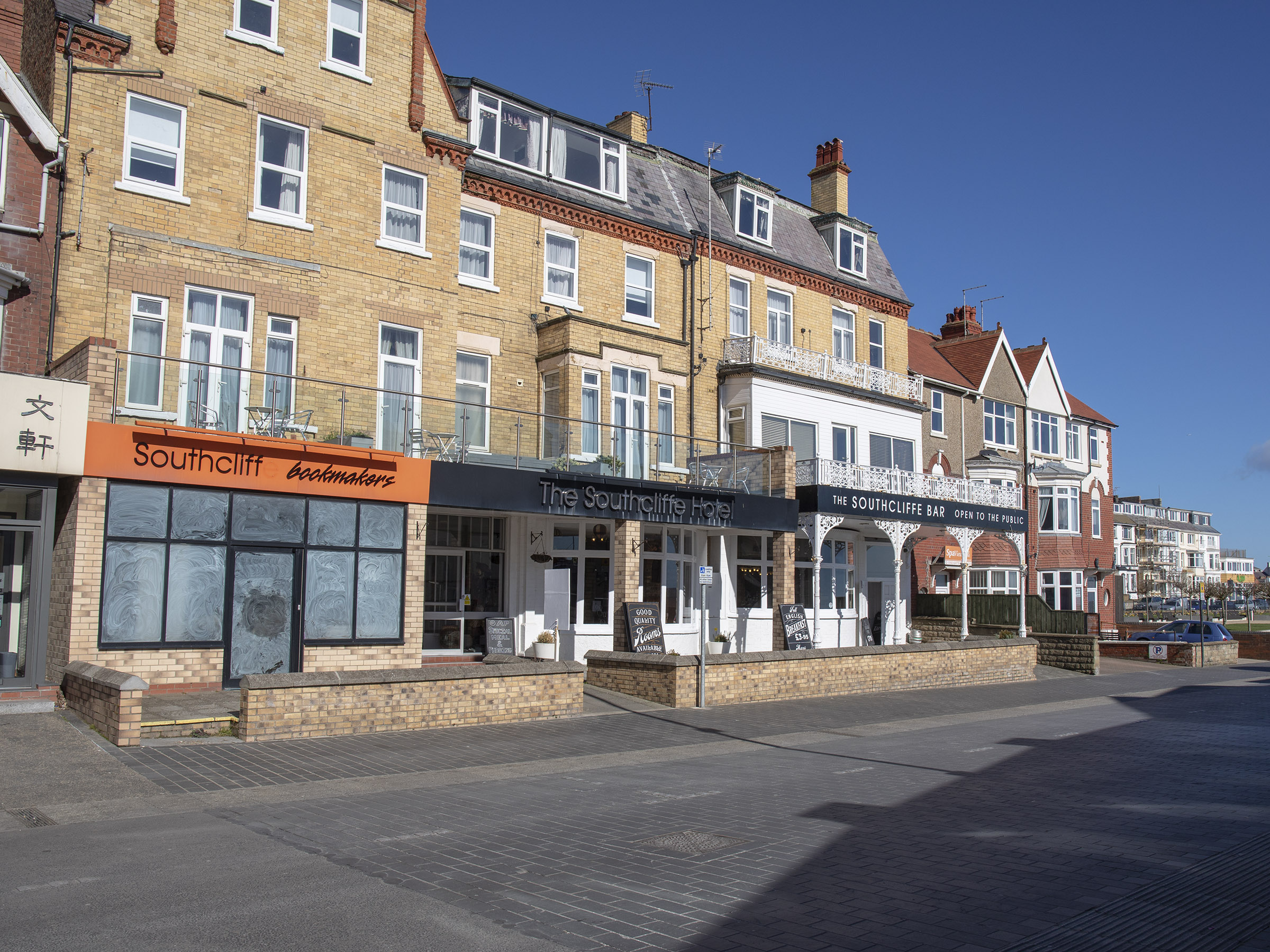
- The Southcliffe Hotel, Bridlington. This was the HQ before the Second World War.

Site information
- Owner: Air Ministry; Ministry of Defence
- Operator: Royal Air Force
- Controlled by: Royal Air Force Marine Branch (ASR and MCU); No. 54 Group RAF

Location
- Location within the East Riding of Yorkshire
- Coordinates: 54.0796°N 0.1965°W
- Grid reference: TA183664

Site history
- In use: 1929–1978

Royal Air Force Bridlington, or more simply RAF Bridlington, was a Royal Air Force station located in Bridlington, East Riding of Yorkshire, England, between 1929 and 1978. Several units operated at Bridlington, Air Gunnery Schools, Initial Training Wings, and an Air Sea Rescue launch unit, but the longest occupier, was No. 1104 Marine Craft Unit (MCU). The station consisted of various buildings across the town that were requisitioned for RAF use before and during the Second World War. Outside of this time, the RAF presence was mostly in the harbour area and as it was such a small unit, No. 1104 MCU was looked after (parented in Air Force parlance) by other RAF Stations nearby.

It is known that under his official Air Force title of Aircraftsman Second Class T. E. Shaw, the archaeologist, (former) army officer, diplomat, and writer, T. E. Lawrence worked at RAF Bridlington during the 1930s.

== History ==
=== Pre-war ===
During the First World War, a Royal Naval Air Service seaplane was stationed temporarily in Bridlington Harbour. However, during the same conflict, a re-fuelling station was set up adjacent to the south landing of the Flamborough lifeboat station; this was sometimes referred to as RAF Bridlington (also RNAS Bridlington) and so some confusion arose between the two. Seaplanes were regularly seen over Bridlington and Bridlington Bay on the lookout for enemy shipping. At some point during the First World War, Bridlington was suggested as a seaplane base, but this never came to pass.

An RAF site was opened on the harbourside at Bridlington in 1929; its remit was to supply dummy craft to be moored in the sea off the Yorkshire Coast for bombing and target practice. These were usually situated at the bombing range at RAF Catfoss (later moved to the range at RAF Cowden), which was located off the coastline near to RAF Catfoss and RAF Lissett (it was originally titled Skipsea bombing range). Initially the site was staffed by personnel from RAF Felixstowe. It later came under the command of RAF Catfoss and then when Catfoss closed, RAF Leconfield. Outside of the Second World War, the Commanding Officer (CO) of the unit was either a pilot officer or flight lieutenant rank; Regular stations or units in the RAF have higher ranks than this for their CO.

The Marine Craft Unit at Bridlington also had an add-on function of patrolling the area to keep merchant fishing vessels clear of the bombing range. It also developed special craft for use elsewhere in the Marine Branch of the Royal Air Force. The RAF unit had some sheds on the promenade in Bridlington known as Gummers Wharf. This is where the last report written by Shaw/Lawrence was dated in February 1935.

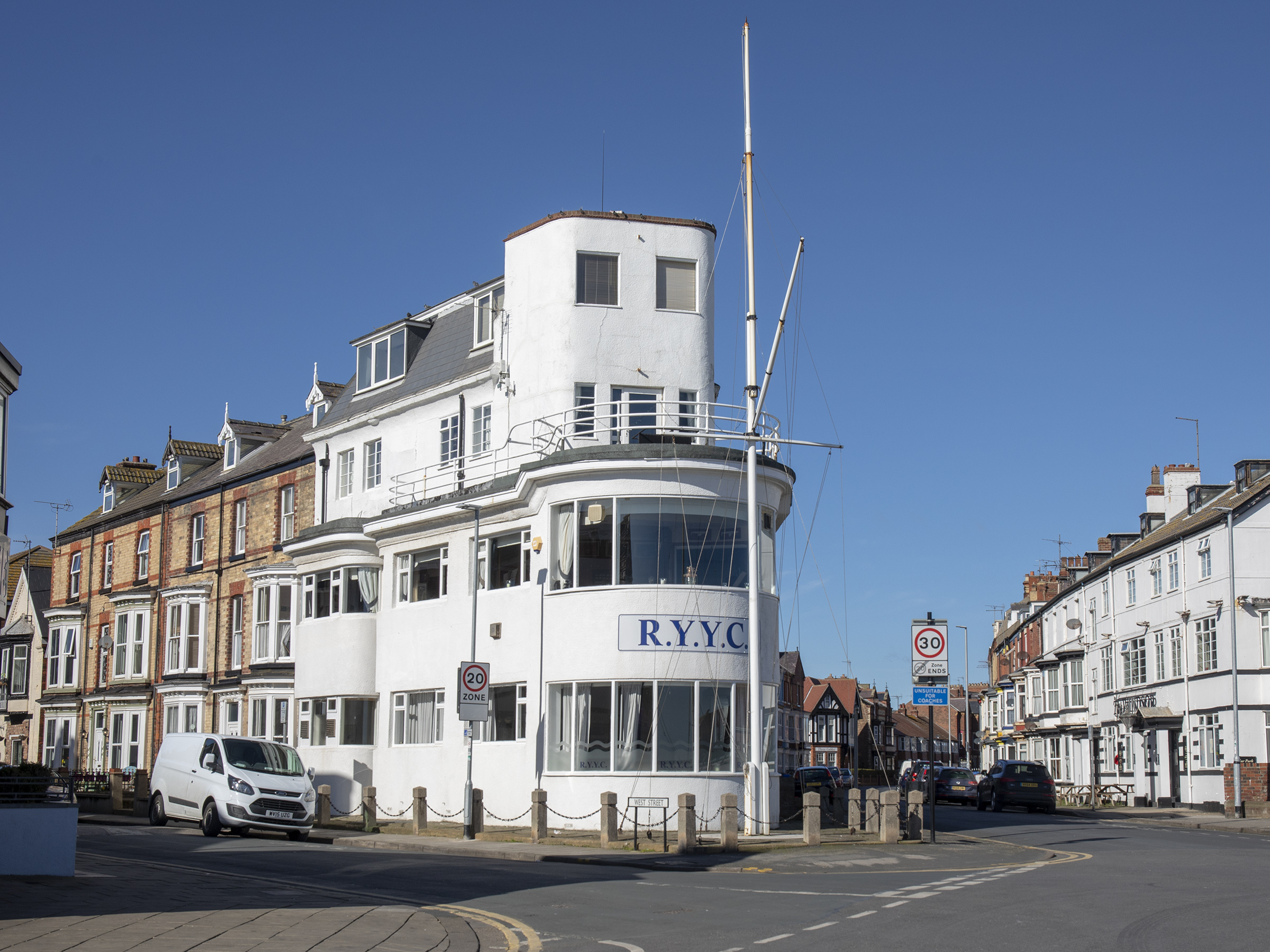
Royal Yorkshire Yacht Club, Bridlington. This was the Ozone Hotel and was where Lawrence was billeted in the 1930s

Shaw (Lawrence) had arrived in the early 1930s as part of his RAF service and his drive to develop better boats for the Marine Branch. Shaw had witnessed a seaplane crashing into the sea off RAF Mount Batten and was greatly affected by the rescue of the airmen; most tellingly, how the boats were not able to reach the downed aircrew in time. Aircraftman Second Class Shaw had been sent to first RAF Mount Batten, (then to Bridlington) ostensibly to keep him "out of the limelight" after a period when he was serving in India and stories started to surface in the press that he was there because of the civil war in Afghanistan. Shaw was not an engineer, but his methodical problem solving and intellectual capacity allowed him to become quite proficient in the boat design programme within the Marine Branch at Bridlington. In his first visit, Shaw was billeted in the Bay View Hotel, and during the second period at Bridlington, he was billeted in the Ozone Hotel. The landlady of the Bay View Hotel later recalled that he slept with a curved dagger next to his bed.

During the second part of the 1930s, the base was the home of a merchant ship named Kernoozer, which was a 500-tonne (550-ton) vessel employed to maintain targets at the Skipsea/Cowden bombing range. Ten 200-class boats were worked on during the 1930s, with steel armour-plating being applied to them after they had been delivered to Bridlington on the railway. Five were stored in the RAF sheds next to Gummers Wharf and the other five were located in various sheds about the harbour. Kernoozer was laid up at the start of the Second World War, but the wartime work pressures meant that she was needed again at Bridlington. However, whilst sailing north from Grimsby she encountered a gale and was beached by the sea at Skipsea where she broke up.

=== Second World War ===
During the Second World War, because of the upsurge in aircraft flying across the North Sea on bombing raids over Europe, the MCU at Bridlington took on the additional role of Air Sea Rescue (ASR), something for which the unit was not originally intended for, but was one of the main functionalities of the Marine Branch. Known as station 21, the ASR operated between 1940 and 1946 with the marine craft on site searching for aircrew who had ditched in the North Sea. During one month in 1941, the launch HSL 102 (High Speed Launch) rescued 38 men who had been lost at sea. Often there would be times when the ASR boat could not go out to search for downed aircrew, and the RNLI lifeboat based at Bridlington, would perform the searches instead. Boats selected for the ASR role were fitted with machine guns in case of aerial attack whilst in the North Sea.

The base was also used for initial recruit training between 1941 and 1944 as No. 14 and No. 20 Initial Training Wing (ITW), which were part of No. 54 Group RAF. The station headquarters was a requisitioned hotel (the Brentwood Hotel, replacing an earlier HQ at Southcliffe Hotel) with recruits and serving airman billeted locally in houses and hotel rooms. Besides recruit training, RAF Bridlington was a loose collection of basic RAF schools. Other training at Bridlington included sea-ditching drills (by jumping off the pier in the harbour), morse code training and an Elementary Air Gunnery School. Air Gunnery courses at Bridlington typically lasted for six weeks. Logistics schools were also opened in the town, especially after RAF Cranwell became overcrowded. As with the other training schools, it was divided up between several buildings and the headquarters was in the Alexandra Hotel in the town.

Nearby Sewerby Hall was also requisitioned as an RAF hospital which was used by sick personnel from RAF Bridlington, RAF Carnaby, RAF Catfoss and RAF Lissett. In 1943, Nos 18 and 19 ITW were merged to form No. 70 ITW at Bridlington. During the Second World War, the loose collection of schools and units were known collectively as RAF Bridlington. However, RAF Carnaby, an emergency airfield to the south-west of Bridlington was also known locally as RAF Bridlington, which caused some confusion.

=== Post-war ===
After the Second World War, RAF Bridlington was scaled back and only the Marine Craft Unit continued to exist. The MCU was one of 15 located throughout the United Kingdom, with another five located around the world near to flying RAF stations. Command and control was reverted to RAF Catfoss and RAF Bridlington ceased as a functioning unit; all elements at Bridlington were parented by other stations. Whilst the ASR function officially ceased in 1946, the craft at Bridlington often assisted the RNLI with searches for those missing at sea post-war, with at least one rescue documented although in that particular case, the casualty had died, despite the efforts of the RAF Crew in trying to revive her. The Search and Rescue function of the MCU was still listed on the Royal National Lifeboat Institution's list of active search and rescue units in 1957 and in 1966.

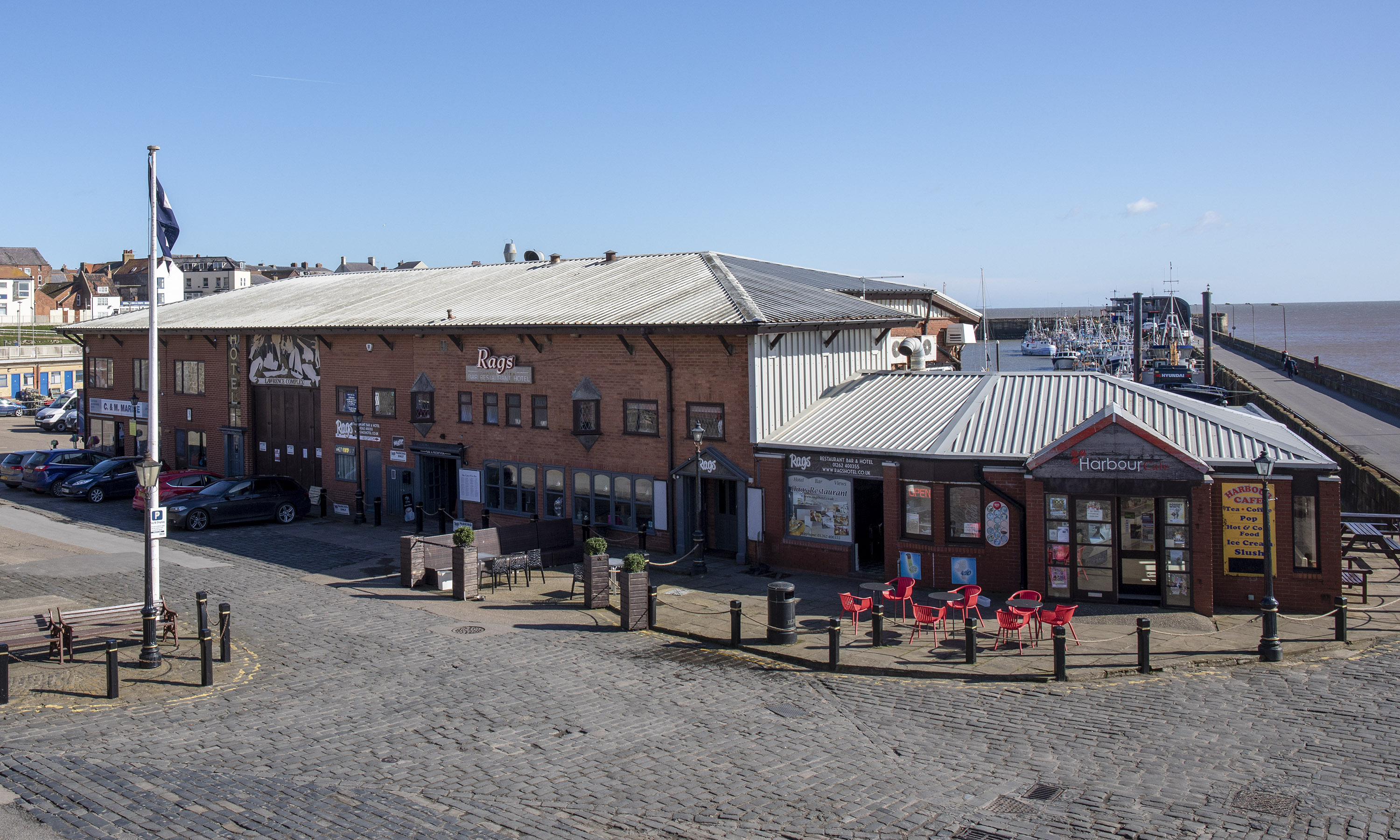
Lawrence Complex on the seafront at Bridlington

In 1969, a tragedy befell 1386 Pinnace, one of the MCU's boats which was based at 1104 MCU Bridlington. She had been on an exercise with helicopters off the coast of Dundee and was making her way down the coast back to base. She stopped off at Amble and whilst attempting to enter the harbour in rough seas, she was capsized. Three of the crew were drowned, the rest were rescued by the RNLI, Royal Navy divers and local fishermen.

By 1972, Bridlington was one of only five MCU bases left in the employ of the Royal Air Force; the other four were Alness, Falmouth, Holyhead and Mount Batten. The sheds at Bridlington harbour were last used by the RAF in 1978. The site they were located on was razed in 1993 and a new building, called the Lawrence Complex was built on the same site. The RAF finally vacated Bridlington in December 1980, while the RAF Marine Branch itself was disbanded six years later in 1986.

One of the fast seaplane tender launches that was located in Bridlington between 1932 and 1942 (No. ST 206), is now on display in the RAF Museum at Hendon in Greater London.

== Units ==
Unit	Dates	Notes	Ref
No. 1 Elementary Air Gunners School (EAGS)	April 1943 – April 1944	Moved to RAF Bridgnorth in 1944	
No. 20 Initial Training Wing (ITW)	?–November 1943	Responsible for wireless operator and air gunnery training. Moved to RAF Usworth	
No. 21 Air Sea Rescue (ASR) unit	1942–1946	Officially operating between 1942 and 1946, but the MCU was using 40-foot (12 m) boats from Bridlington in an ASR role as early as February 1941	
No. 70 Initial Training Wing (ITW)	1943–1944	Responsible for Wireless Operator (Air) training	
No. 1104 Marine Craft Unit (MCU)	1929–1980	Longest serving RAF unit at Bridlington	
RAF CTC (Civilian Technical Corps)	1941–1943		
RAF ETS (Equipment Training School)	1941–1944		

== Notable people ==
- Johnny Johnson (the last Dambuster) – attended RAF Bridlington in Winter 1942 for Elementary Air Gunnery Training before being posted to RAF Morpeth.
- T E Lawrence - part of the MCU in 1932 and again between 1934 and early 1935.
