= Bridlington Town Hall =

Municipal building in Bridlington, East Riding of Yorkshire, England

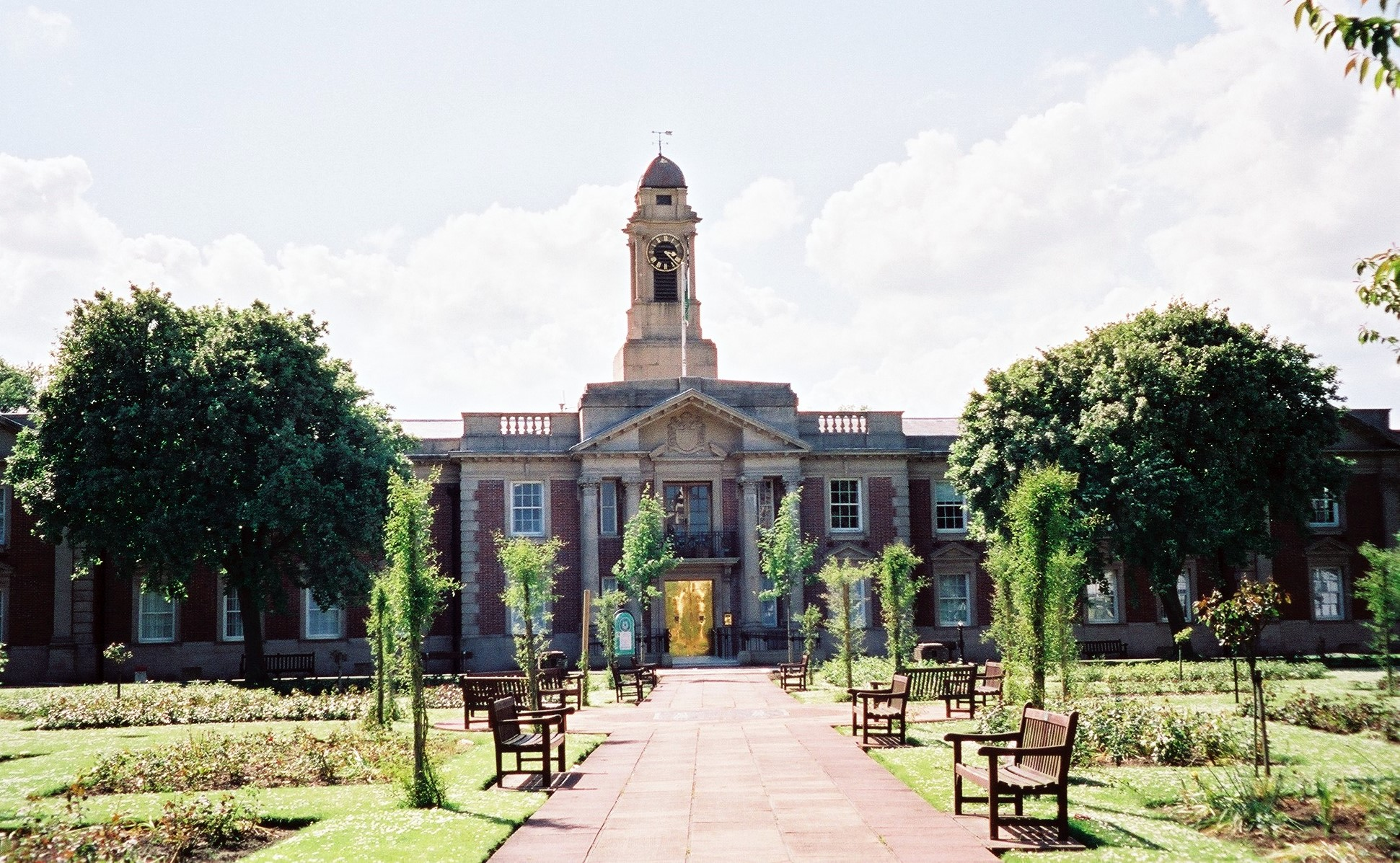
- Bridlington Town Hall

- Shown in East Riding of Yorkshire
- 54.0852°N 0.1994°W
- Location: Quay Road, Bridlington

History
- Built: 1932

Site notes
- Architect: Percy Maurice Newton
- Architectural style: Neoclassical style

Listed Building – Grade II
- Official name: Bridlington Town Hall
- Designated: 23 January 1989
- Reference no.: 1334329

Bridlington Town Hall is a municipal building in Quay Road, Bridlington, East Riding of Yorkshire, England. The town hall, which was the meeting place of Bridlington Borough Council, is a Grade II listed building. It now serves as an area office of East Riding of Yorkshire Council.

== History ==
In the late 19th century meetings of Bridlington Borough Council were held in the courtroom on the first floor of the Bayle Gate. After civic leaders found this arrangement inadequate, they acquired a private house in Quay Road known as the "White Lodge" which had been owned by the Lamplugh family and built in the 1830s: the house served as the council's municipal building until the early 1930s when it was demolished to make way for the new town hall.

The foundation stone for the new building was laid by the mayor, Alderman H. Harker, on 24 September 1931. It was designed by the borough surveyor, Percy Maurice Newton, in the neoclassical style and was officially opened by the mayor, Councillor J. A. Dew on 13 May 1932. The design involved a symmetrical main frontage with fifteen bays facing the corner of Quay Road and Station Avenue with the end bays slightly projected forward; the central section of five bays, which also slightly projected forward, featured a full-height tetrastyle portico with a doorway on the ground floor and a balcony and French doors on the first floor flanked by four Corinthian order columns supporting an open pediment containing the town's coat of arms. There was a three-stage cupola with a clock and a dome, modelled on a similar structure at the Royal Hospital Chelsea, at roof level. (The tower and clock were added to the design at a late stage, after the tender for the building work turned out to be much lower than the council's original estimate.) Internally, the principal rooms were the council chamber on the ground floor in the south wing and the ballroom on the ground floor in the north wing as well as the mayor's parlour.

The town hall was the headquarters of Bridlington Borough Council for much of the 20th century. In 1974 it became the headquarters of North Wolds District Council, which replaced the borough council, and was renamed East Yorkshire Borough Council in 1981. East Yorkshire Borough Council was abolished in 1996 and the building passed to its successor, East Riding of Yorkshire Council, which has its headquarters at County Hall, Beverley, but continues to use Bridlington Town Hall as an area office.

The council chamber was the venue for the public inquiry in 2003 into the possible creation of a marina for the town, which would have included a conference centre, luxury flats, retail developments and a yacht club as well as berths for 500 yachts: the inquiry recommended that the scheme should not proceed because of environmental concerns. The concept was resurrected when plans for a smaller scheme, with berths for just 250 yachts, were unveiled in November 2015.

In November 2016 the council announced a programme of works to convert the council chamber into a flexible space for meetings and to convert the ballroom into a new hub for job seekers. The changes would facilitate the relocation of the existing jobcentre in Crown Buildings, located just to the northwest of the building, into the town hall. The works, which were carried out by Houlton of Kingston upon Hull at a cost of £3 million, were completed in October 2020. The offices on the first floor, which are occupied by staff from various departments of East Riding of Yorkshire Council, were unaffected by the changes.

== See also ==
- Listed buildings in Bridlington (Quay area)
