= Bridlington Harbour =

Harbour in Bridlington, East Riding of Yorkshire, England

Coordinates: 54.0806°N 0.1892°W

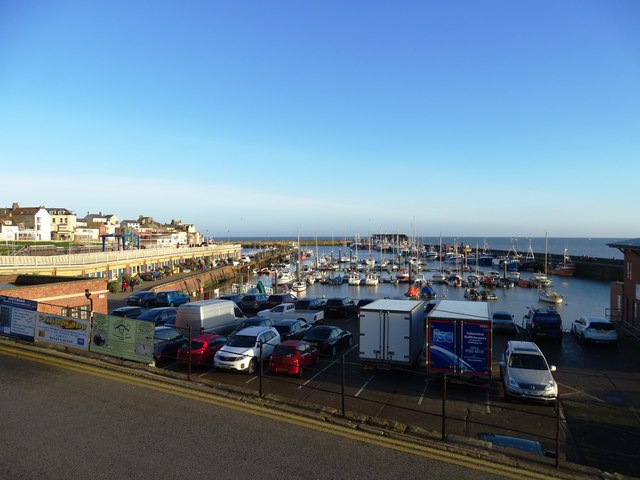
The harbour, in 2016

Bridlington Harbour is a sheltered area of water in the town of Bridlington, East Riding of Yorkshire, in England.

== History ==
In the 2nd century, Ptolemy described a bay suitable for a harbour, which may well have been that of Bridlington. A port was active at the mouth of the Gypsey Race river from the Roman period. A harbour was first recorded in 1113, when its ownership passed from Gilbert de Gant to Bridlington Priory. Wooden piers were constructed to enclose the harbour, then in 1538 these were rebuilt as rock-filled timber piers, the stone perhaps taken from the priory. The piers were frequently damaged by the sea and rebuilt, with a board of commissioners established in 1697 to assume responsibility for the harbour. Rebuilding continued, but eventually an infestation of shipworm made maintenance prohibitive, and instead, the piers were rebuilt in stone.

Work on the North Pier began in 1816, to a design by Simon Goodrick, and was completed in 1843. The neighbouring wharf, Crane Wharf, was rebuilt as part of the scheme and was completed by 1819. To its west was Langdale's Wharf, developed in the early 19th century. The South Pier was built between 1843 and 1848, to a design by James Walker. It was 75 metres to the south of its predecessor, doubling the size of the harbour. However, this left a gap between the two piers which allowed large waves to enter, and this along with the opening of Bridlington railway station led to a decline in trade at the port. John Coode designed an extension to the North Pier which was completed in 1866, solving the issue with waves, and enabling the use of the harbour for leisure and the development of a fishing fleet.

A slipway was added to the South Pier in 1885, and a stepped landing stage was added to Crane Wharf in about 1900, mostly for use for pleasure trips. In 1932, the South Pier was widened to allow the construction of a fish market, and around this time, the Chicken Run Jetty was constructed on the line of the old south pier. In the 1950s or 1960s, steel piling was added to much of the northern quayside, while from 1998 to 1999, the northwest corner of the harbour was filled in, and the outlet of the Gypsey Race was culverted.

In 2026, the construction of a marina in the harbour was proposed. Other contemporary uses include passenger boat trips, leisure angling expeditions, and limited commercial fishing.

== South Pier ==
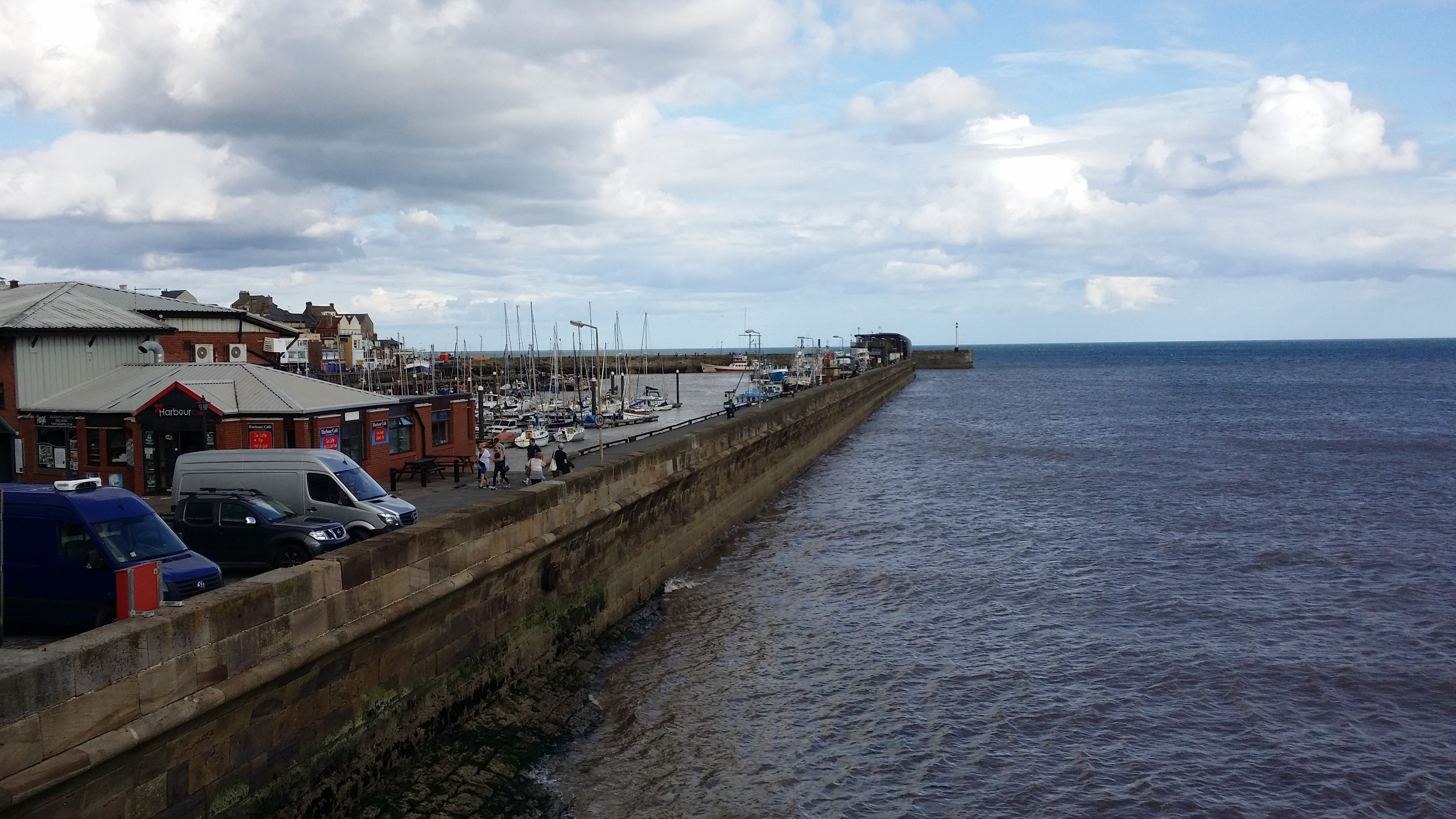
The south pier

The South Pier is built of sandstone blocks. It forms the southern side of the harbour, and extends westward for about 460 metres (1,510 ft). On the south side is a slipway, Gummer's Landing, and on the northern side is a flight of steps. The pier is widened on the harbour side to accommodate a fish market, and there is another widening halfway along the pier. On the pier are a capstan, bollard and rope guide, all 19th century and in cast iron. The pier and wharf have been jointly grade II listed since 2001.

== North Pier ==
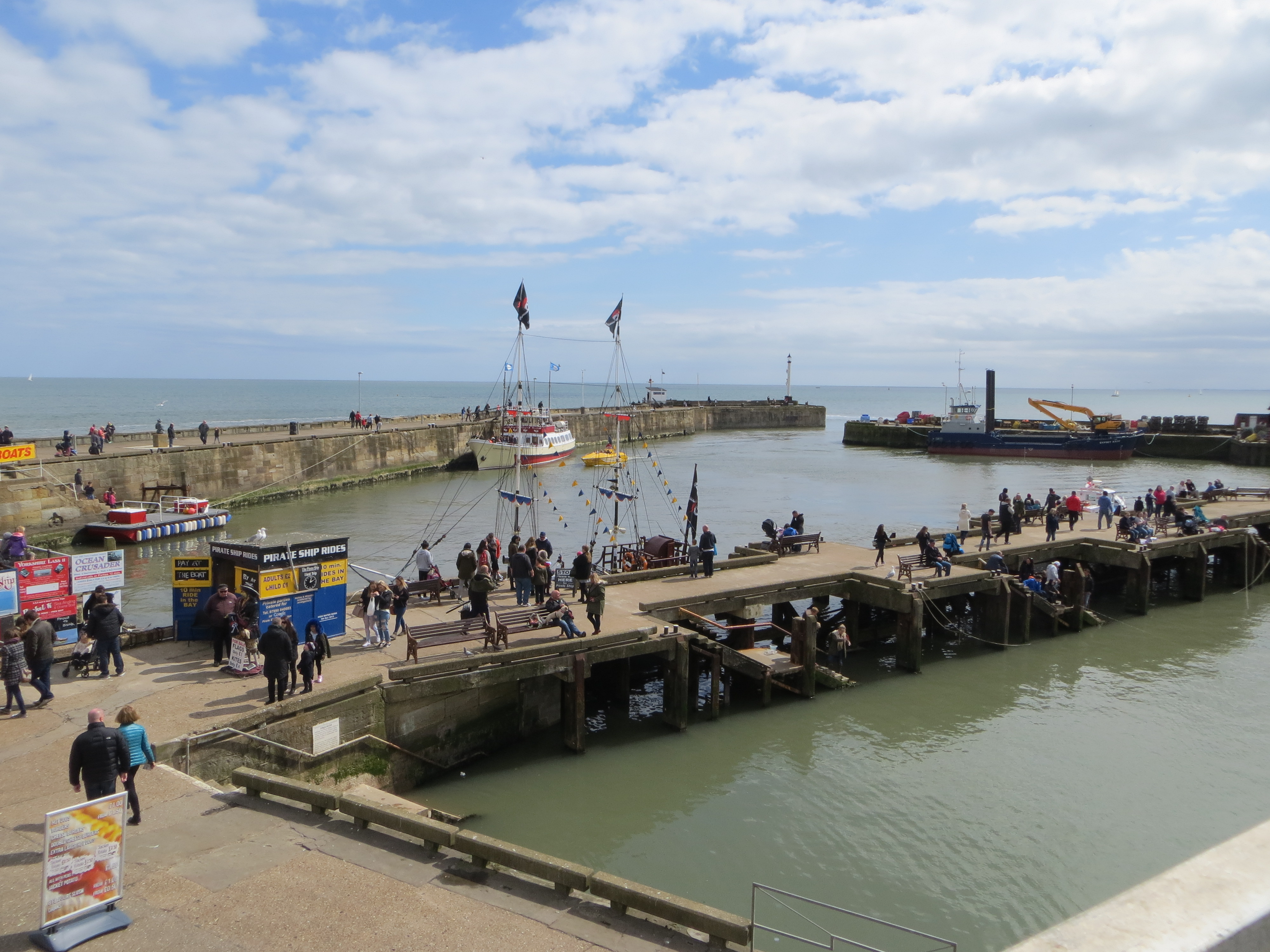
Jetty and north pier

The North Pier is built of sandstone blocks, the extension has concrete blocks, the core is filled with chalk, and the middle section incorporates iron sheet piles. It is the earliest structure known to have such piles. The pier forms the eastern side of the harbour, and extends for about 223 metres (732 ft). Crane Wharf extends for about 50 metres (160 ft) to the west, and incorporates a jetty extending into the harbour. On the pier are a capstan, thought to have come from a 19th-century man-of-war, several 19th-century iron bollards, and remains of a mooring ring. At the southern end of the pier is a light built of steel and fibreglass, a 1990s replica of the original. The pier has also been grade II listed since 2001.

== See also ==
- Listed buildings in Bridlington (Quay area)
- Yorkshire coast fishery
