= Pinnace No. 1386 sinking =

Boat sinking in North-East England

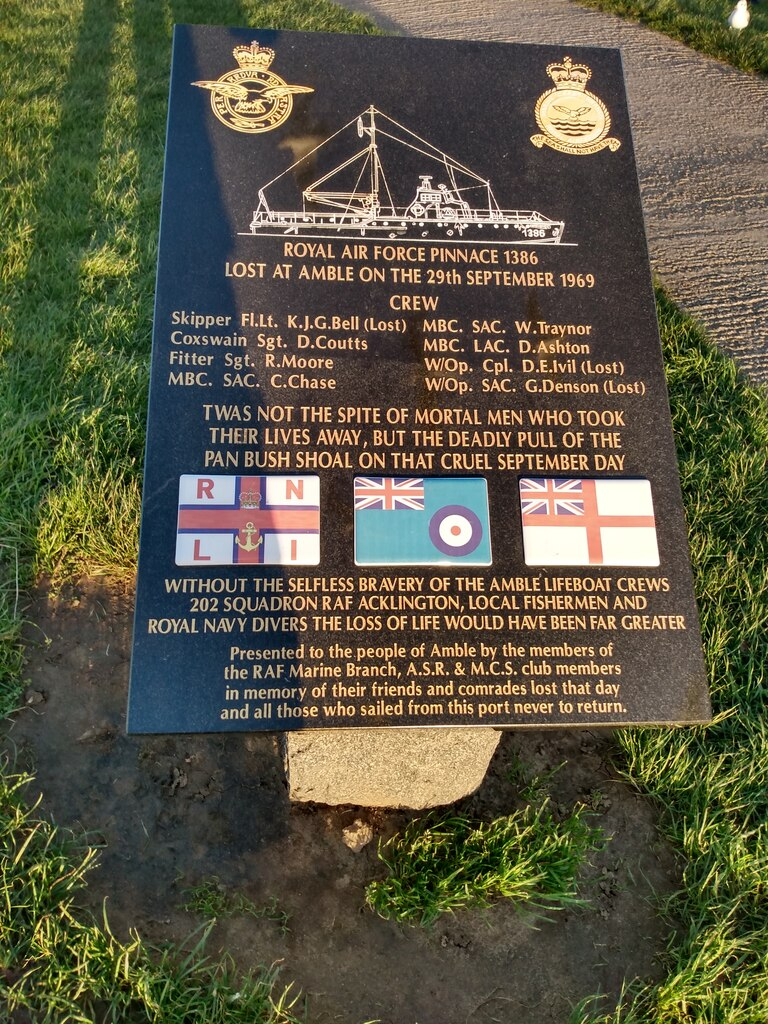
- Pinnace 1386 Memorial
- Date: 29 September 1969
- Time: 6:30 pm (GMT)
- Location: Amble harbour, Northumberland, England; 55.338°N 1.567°W
- Type: Ship sinking
- Cause: Capsized by large swell at sea
- Deaths: 3

The Pinnace No. 1386 sinking occurred on 29 September 1969 in Amble harbour, Northumberland, England. The boat involved was a pinnace of the Royal Air Force's Marine Craft Section based at RAF Bridlington. The craft had been taking part in air-sea rescue practice drills in Scotland during the day, and it was due to be carrying out further drills at Amble with a helicopter crew based at nearby RAF Acklington. As the boat was attempting to enter the harbour at Amble, a huge swell capsized the boat and she was left foundering. Even though a multi-agency rescue attempt was launched, three of her crew died in the sinking.

It was the RAF's Marine Branch's greatest peacetime loss.

== Sinking ==
The boat and her crew had been on exercise near to Dundee, and she then later sailed for Amble harbour down the eastern coast of the United Kingdom on 29 September 1969. The crew had been due to partake in another exercise with helicopters based at RAF Acklington, which was near to Amble harbour. As they approached Amble harbour, they could see heavy swells breaking over the north pier, so they tried to enter the harbour across the northernmost tip of Pan Bush. Pan Bush is a shoal outside of Amble harbour, just to the south, which in places is only 0.3 metres (1 ft 0 in) deep. The crew of Pinnace 1386 were watching the swells closely, some up to 100 feet (30 m) between crests, so that they could pick the right time to try to get into the harbour. At 6:30 pm, the coastguard at Amble was watching a yacht trying to get into the harbour thinking it would need assistance, but it made it into the harbour safely. However, right behind it, was Pinnace 1386, which rolled over about 0.5-mile (0.80 km) from the harbour.

When the boat had stopped rolling, the crew were initially disorientated, but they realised a hatch in the roof was now below them. After some struggling, they managed to free the hatch, but the cabin filed with water to a greater depth. It was at this point that they realised that David Ashton couldn't swim. Initially, the first two men who had gone through the hatch were clinging to a life-buoy that was being washed out to sea. They were rescued by the inshore rescue boat (IRB) at 6:42 pm, some twelve minutes after the first alarm was raised. The two were suffering from shock and exposure, but they were able to state that three men were still inside and the skipper was unaccounted for. The Amble lifeboat tried to tow the upturned boat further into the harbour and safer water, but the boat was fouled on something underneath. It was later stated that this was possibly the mast, but the boat was able to be dragged a small way further into the harbour and so into calmer waters. One man was rescued by the Amble lifeboat (Millie Walton) from the upturned hull of the boat, and another man was winched out of the sea by a helicopter. David Ashton was rescued after being trapped in the upside down boat for six hours. When he was on his own, Ashton found an air bubble to put his head into which he estimates was at a maximum of 3–4 inches (76–102 mm) deep. The IRB had later returned to the upturned boat around 7:10 pm with two divers, but the swell made it impossible for them to get underneath the boat, and they were later returned to the harbour by the IRB as they were exhausted.

After another attempt to tow the boat failed at around 8:00 pm, vehicles had been parked on the south headland so that the lifeboatmen could work under the glare of the car headlights. Royal Navy divers who had been flown in for the rescue, carried their gear across the rocks and waded out to the boat at low tide, and with cutting gear, they hacked a hole through the hull to get to Ashton. RAF helicopters from RAF Acklington recovered the bodies of the three men who died; they were found the next day when the search resumed on the rocks south of the harbour.

At the inquest, one of the survivors testified that they entered Amble Harbour in a heavy swell, but "nothing out of the ordinary". He also stated that

When we were three-quarters of the way up the swell, the base of the swell seemed to stop and there was a drop of 20ft on the starboard side. As we shot up to the top of the wave the skipper said "Christ; there's nothing beneath it!", and we just toppled over.

The inquest jury recorded a verdict of death by misadventure on the three who had died, after being directed to do so by the coroner. The coroner stated that "...there was no evidence of criminal negligence. Whether they came to the conclusion that the skipper made a mistake in changing course, or that the overturning of the launch was because of a freak sea, the only verdict open to them was death from misadventure."

Post-Second World War, it was the greatest loss of life by the Marine Branch in one incident. In 1970, two of those involved in the rescue were awarded gallantry medals by the RNLI, the first time that the RNLI had awarded gallantry medals for an inshore boat rescue. In 2018, a memorial was unveiled in the harbour to those who had died in the incident.
