= SAE J1587 =

Society of Automotive Engineers standard SAE J1587 is an automotive diagnostic protocol standard developed by the Society of Automotive Engineers (SAE) for heavy-duty and most medium-duty vehicles built after 1985. The J1587 protocol uses different diagnostic connectors. Up to 1995, individual OEMs used their own connectors. From 1996 to 2001, the 6-pin Deutsch-connector was standard. Beginning in 2001, most OEMs converted to the 9-pin Deutsch. Some OEMs still use the 6-pin Deutsch. It has mostly been used for US made vehicles, and also by Volvo. Other European brands have usually used KWP.

The pinout for the 9-pin connector is:

Pin	Signal
A	Ground
B	Unswitched +12 volts
F	J1708Datalink (+)
G	J1708Datalink (−)

The pinout for the 6-pin connector is:

Pin	Signal
A	J1708Datalink (+)
B	J1708Datalink (−)
C	Unswitched +12 volts
E	Ground

SAE J1708 makes up the physical and data link layers while SAE J1587 makes up the transport and application layers with respect to the OSI model. SAE J1587 is used in conjunction with SAE J1708 for automobile communication.
