= Bridlington School =

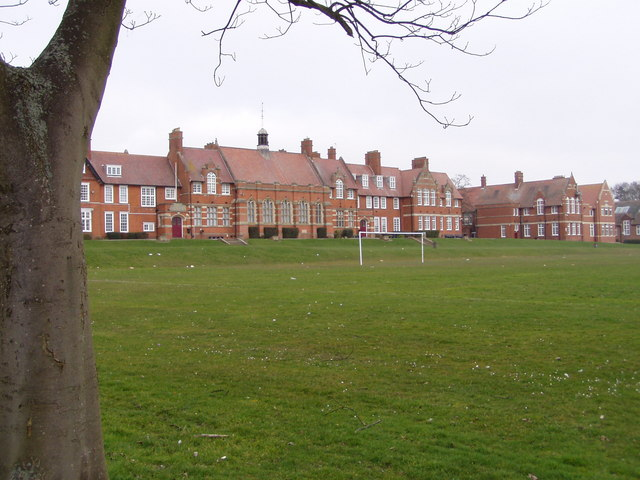

Location
- Bessingby Road; Bridlington, East Riding of Yorkshire, YO16 4QU; England; 54.0851°N 0.2119°W

Information
- Type: Voluntary controlled school
- Motto: Vitai Lampada Tradunt (They hand on the torch of life)
- Established: 1899
- Department for Education URN: 118111 Tables
- Ofsted: Reports
- Head teacher: Kate Parker-Randall
- Age: 11 to 18
- Enrolment: 1,020 pupils
- Website: http://www.bridlingtonschool.co.uk/

Bridlington School is a secondary comprehensive school with sixth form located on Bessingby Road (A165), in Bridlington, in the East Riding of Yorkshire, England.

== History ==
=== Grammar school ===
The school was formed from Bridlington School (a grammar school founded on the site 20 September 1899, although founded in 1447 by King Henry VI) on Bessingby Road and Bridlington High School for Girls (founded in 1905) on St John's Street. The girls' school was opened on 26 September 1905 by Beilby Lawley, 3rd Baron Wenlock; it cost £3,500.

In November 1938, 13-year-old Tom Elliott of Weaverthorpe died at the school when a small splinter of bone in a playground accident punctured a main artery.

The school had around 550 boys in the 1950s and 1960s with a boarding school. The girls' school also had a boarding house. The girls' school had around 550 girls.

=== Comprehensive ===
In 1975 the LEA (one year after Humberside County Council was formed with its base in Beverley) changed the school to a comprehensive. The high school site became Bridlington Lower School and the current site was the Upper School. Most of the lower school site has become a housing estate, although the main building, visible from Quay Road, has been preserved and converted into flats. When a comprehensive it still had its girls' and boys' boarding houses until the 1990s. It no longer has a boarding house.

== School motto ==
The school motto is Vitai Lampada Tradunt, taken from the Roman poet and philosopher Lucretius' De Rerum Natura (On the Nature of the Universe – Book II, Line 79), and directly translates as "They Hand on the Torch of Life". The motto is shared with that of Sydney Church of England Grammar School, North Sydney, Australia.

== Combined Cadet Force ==
The school has a Combined Cadet Force which celebrated its centenary in 2010. Before the CCF, the school had an Officers Training Corps. It has all three sections. The Combined Cadet Force is one of the Schools stronger attributes.

== Awards ==
- The school was awarded Sports College status in 2002
- Sportsmark was awarded in 2007 by Sport England
- The school was awarded Artsmark in 2008 by Arts Council England

== Academic standards ==
Bridlington School emerged from special measures on 1 March 2007. The most recent full Ofsted inspection of the school in May 2013 concluded it was a "good" school. A short inspection on 5 June 2017 confirmed that the school had retained its "good" rating.

The Sixth Form has recently joined with Headlands Sixth Form to form 'The Shores'.

== Notable former pupils ==
- Geoffrey Bayldon, actor
- Ernie Cooper; Guinness Record holder for the longest Rugby Union penalty kick — 81-yard (74.06 m), while captaining the school against an Army team in a match played at the school in 1944.
- Andrew Dismore; Labour MP from 1997–2010 for Hendon
- Air Marshal Sir Eric Dunn KBE CB BEM CEng FRAeS RAF, former Chief Engineer of the RAF in the mid-1980s
- Norman Feather, FRS, nuclear physicist.

== See also ==
- List of the oldest schools in the United Kingdom
