= Bridlington =

Seaside Town and civil parish in the East Riding of Yorkshire, England

Coordinates: 54°04′59″N 0°11′32″W

- Town and civil parish
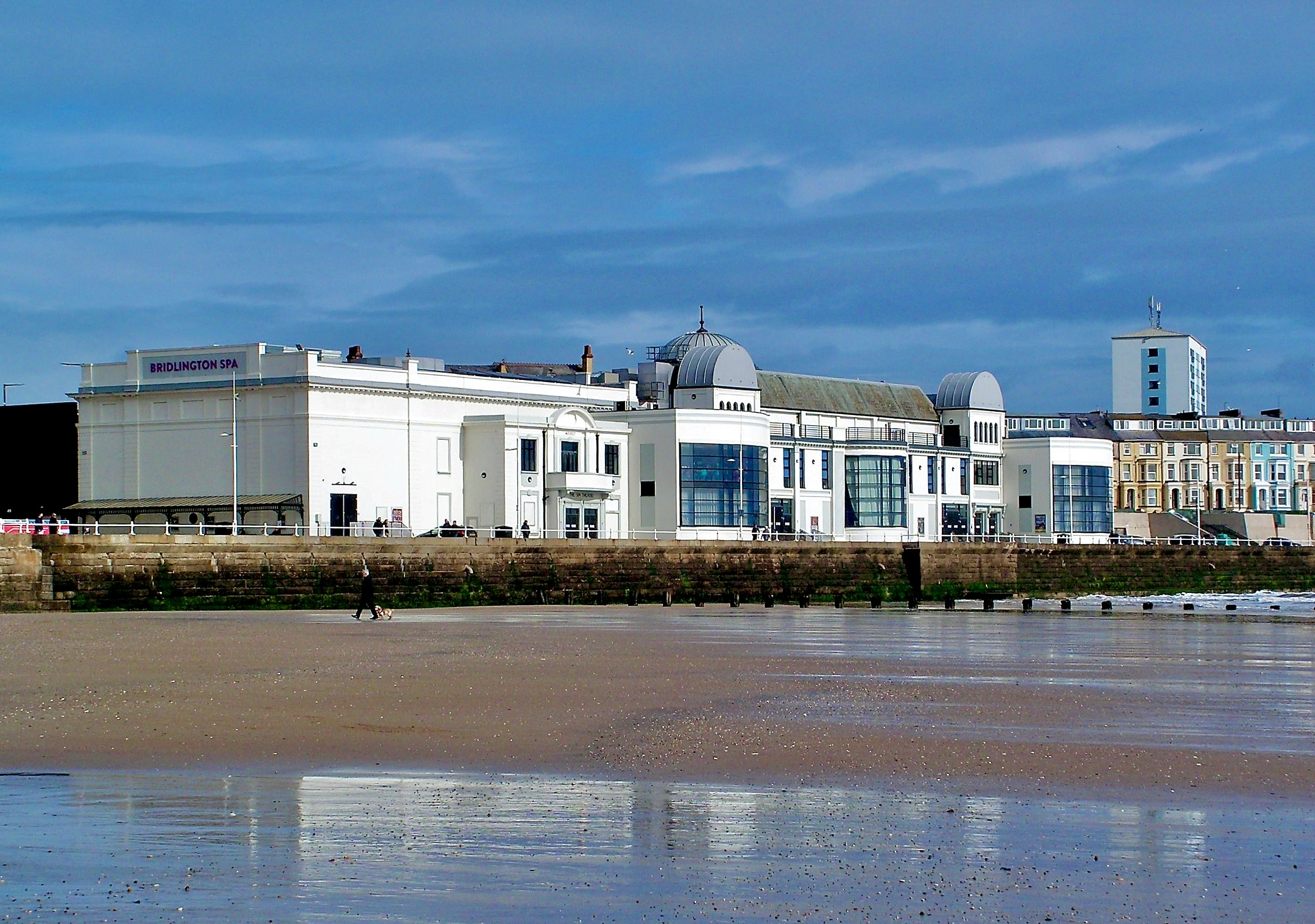
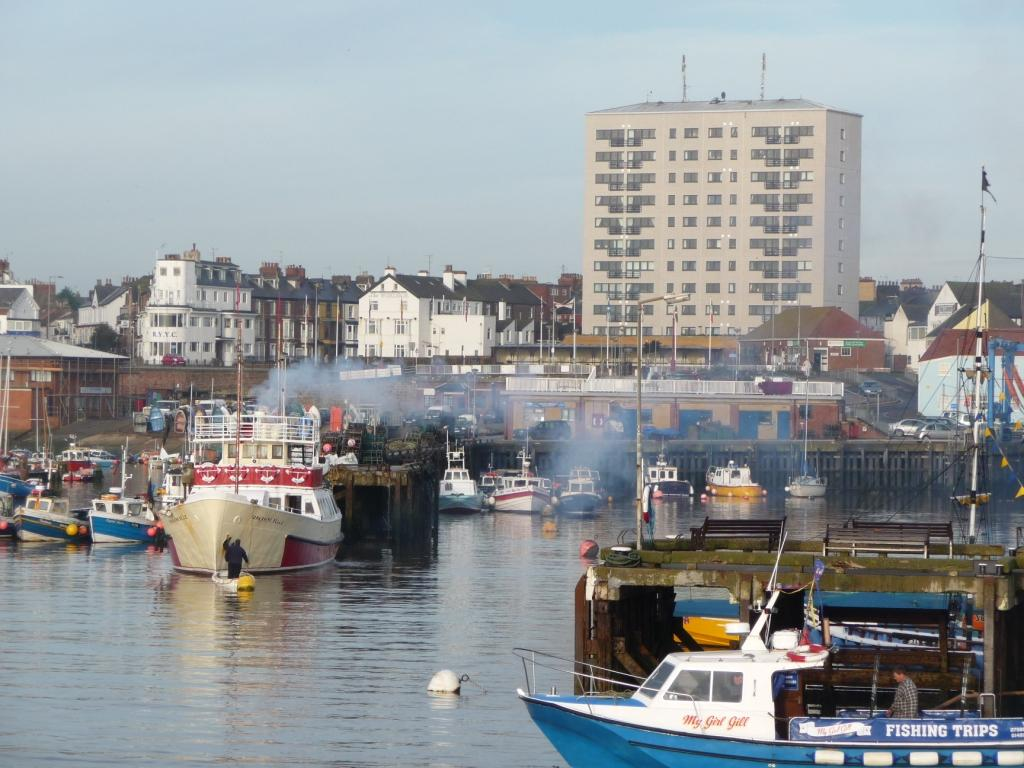
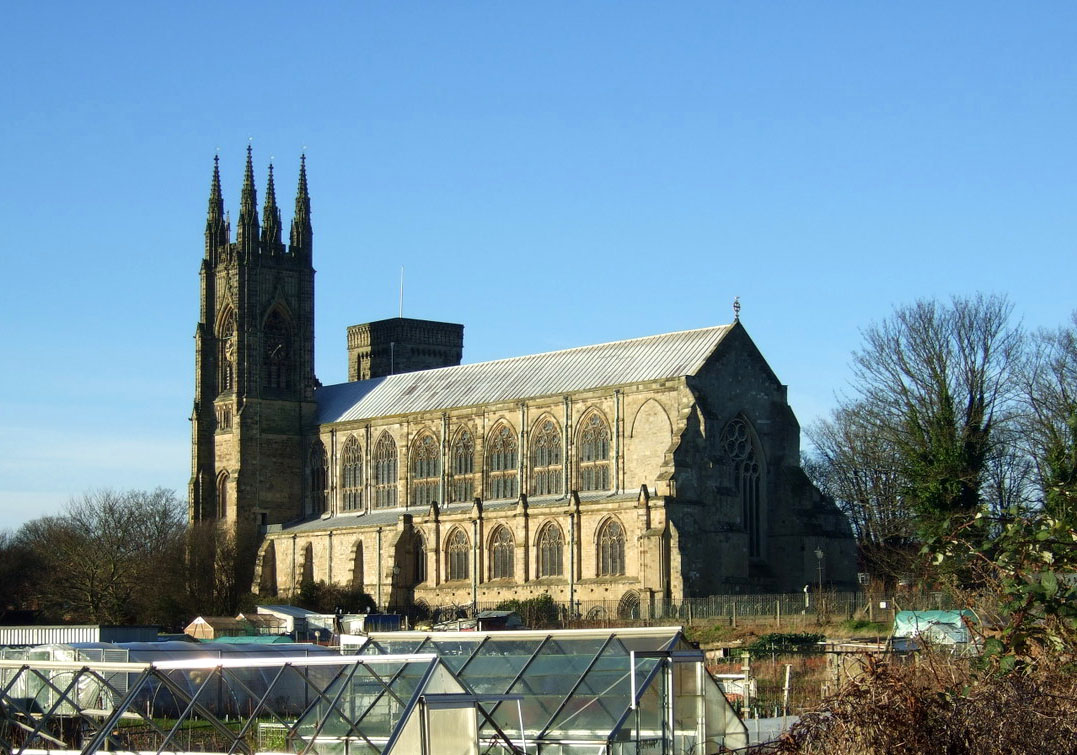
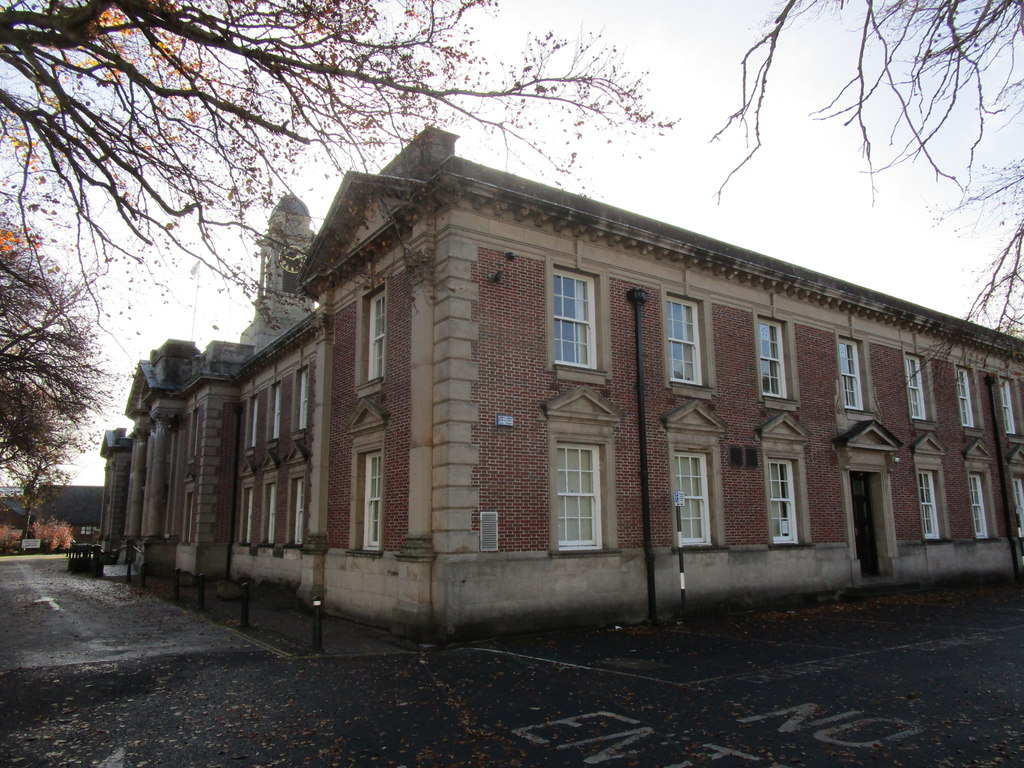
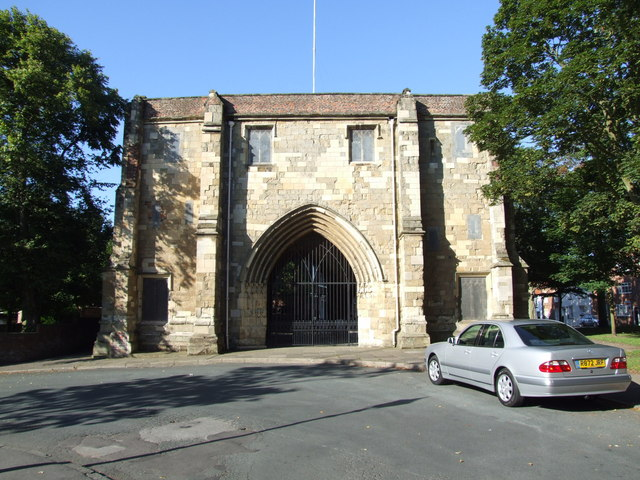
- Bridlington Spa The Harbour Bridlington Priory Town Hall The Bayle

- Arms of Bridlington Town Council

- Location within the East Riding of Yorkshire
- Area: 8.91 sq mi (23.1 km^{2})
- Population: 38,404 (2021 census)
  - Density: 4,310/sq mi (1,660/km^{2})
- Civil parish population: 35,369 (2011 census)
- OS grid reference: TA1866
  - London: 180 mi (290 km) S
- Civil parish: Bridlington
- Unitary authority: East Riding of Yorkshire
- Ceremonial county: East Riding of Yorkshire
- Region: Yorkshire and the Humber
- Country: England
- Sovereign state: United Kingdom
- Post town: BRIDLINGTON
- Postcode district: YO15/YO16
- Dialling code: 01262
- Police: Humberside
- Fire: Humberside
- Ambulance: Yorkshire
- UK Parliament: Bridlington and The Wolds
- Website: www.bridlington.gov.uk

Bridlington is a seaside town and civil parish in the East Riding of Yorkshire, England. It is on the Holderness part (Flamborough Head to the Humber estuary) of the Yorkshire Coast by the North Sea. The town is about 28 miles (45 km) north of Hull and 34 miles (55 km) east of York. The stream called Gypsey Race flows through the town and enters the North Sea at the harbour.

The Priory Church of St Mary and the associated Bayle (or gate) are Grade I listed buildings on the site of an Augustinian Priory. As a sea-fishing port, the town is known for shellfish, and is the largest lobster port in Europe, with over 300 tonnes of the crustaceans landed there each year. It has been termed the "Lobster Capital of Europe". Alongside manufacturing, retail and service firms, its main trade is summer tourism. It holds one of the UK's coastal weather stations.

== History ==
=== Ancient history ===
Archaeological evidence shows habitation of the area around the Bronze Age and Roman Britain era. The date of earliest habitation at Bridlington is unknown, but the 2.5-mile (4 km) man-made Danes Dyke at nearby Flamborough Head goes back to the Bronze Age.

A Roman road from York, now Woldgate, can be traced across the Yorkshire Wolds into the town. Roman coins have been found: two hoards in the harbour area, along with two Greek coins from the second century BC — suggesting the port was in use long before the Roman conquest of Britain.

In the fourth century AD, Count Theodosius set up signal stations on the North Yorkshire coast to warn of Saxon raids. It has been suggested that the current town was built near the site of a Roman maritime station called Gabrantovicorum. In the early second-century, Ptolemy described what was possibly Bridlington Bay in his Geography as Γαβραντουικων Ευλίμενος κόλπος: "Gabrantwikone bay suitable for a harbour". No sheltered ancient harbour has been found, coastal erosion will have destroyed traces of any Roman installation near Bridlington Harbour.

Another position at Flamborough Head is also believed to have been a signal station – probably on Beacon Hill (now a gravel quarry) from where Filey, Scarborough Castle and the Whitby promontory can be seen. Another suggestion has been a line of signal stations stretching south round Bridlington Bay. A fort at Bridlington would have made a centre of operations for these. This counterpart to the northern chain would have guarded a huge accessible anchorage from barbarian piracy.

=== Manor of Bretlinton ===
Near Dukes Park are two bowl barrows known as Butt Hills, designated ancient monuments in the National Heritage List for England of Historic England. Nearby are remains of an Anglo-Saxon cemetery on a farm outside Sewerby. The several suggested origins all trace the name to the Anglo-Saxon custom of matching a personal name with a settlement type. Here the personal names advanced include Bretel, Bridla and Berhtel, attached to -ingtūn, an Old English term for a small farming community. In 1072 the area was given to Gilbert de Gant, uncle of the later king King Stephen; it was inherited by his son Walter and thereafter appears to follow the normal descent of that family.

The 1086 Domesday Book contains the earliest known reference to Bridlington being record as Bretlinton: the settlement has since been called Berlington, Brellington and Britlington before gaining its present name in the 19th century. The Domesday Book records that Bretlinton was the Hunthow Wapentake's meeting point (the wapentake later merged with neighbouring wapentakes to form the Dickering Wapentake). The wapentake was held by Earl Morcar; it later passed to William the Conqueror by forfeiture. It also records the effect of the Harrying of the North: the annual value of the land had fallen from £32 in the time of Edward the Confessor to eight shillings (£0.40) at the time of the survey, comprising two villeins and one socman with one and a half of a carucate, the rest being waste.

=== Priory, port and town charter ===
Walter de Gant founded an Augustinian priory on the land in 1133, confirmed by Henry I in a charter. Several succeeding kings confirmed and extended Walter de Gant's gift: King Stephen granted an additional right to have a port, King John in 1200 gave permission for a weekly market and an annual fair, and Henry VI allowed three annual fairs, on the Nativity of Mary and the Deposition and Translation of St John of Bridlington in 1446. In 1415 Henry V visited the Priory to give thanks for victory at the Battle of Agincourt.

After the Dissolution of the Monasteries, the manor of Bridlington remained with the Crown until 1624, when Charles I passed it to Sir John Ramsey, who had recently been created Earl of Holderness. In 1633, Sir George Ramsey sold the manor to 13 inhabitants of the town, on behalf of all the manor tenants. In May 1636, a deed was drawn up empowering the 13 men as Lords Feoffees or trust holders of the Manor of Bridlington.

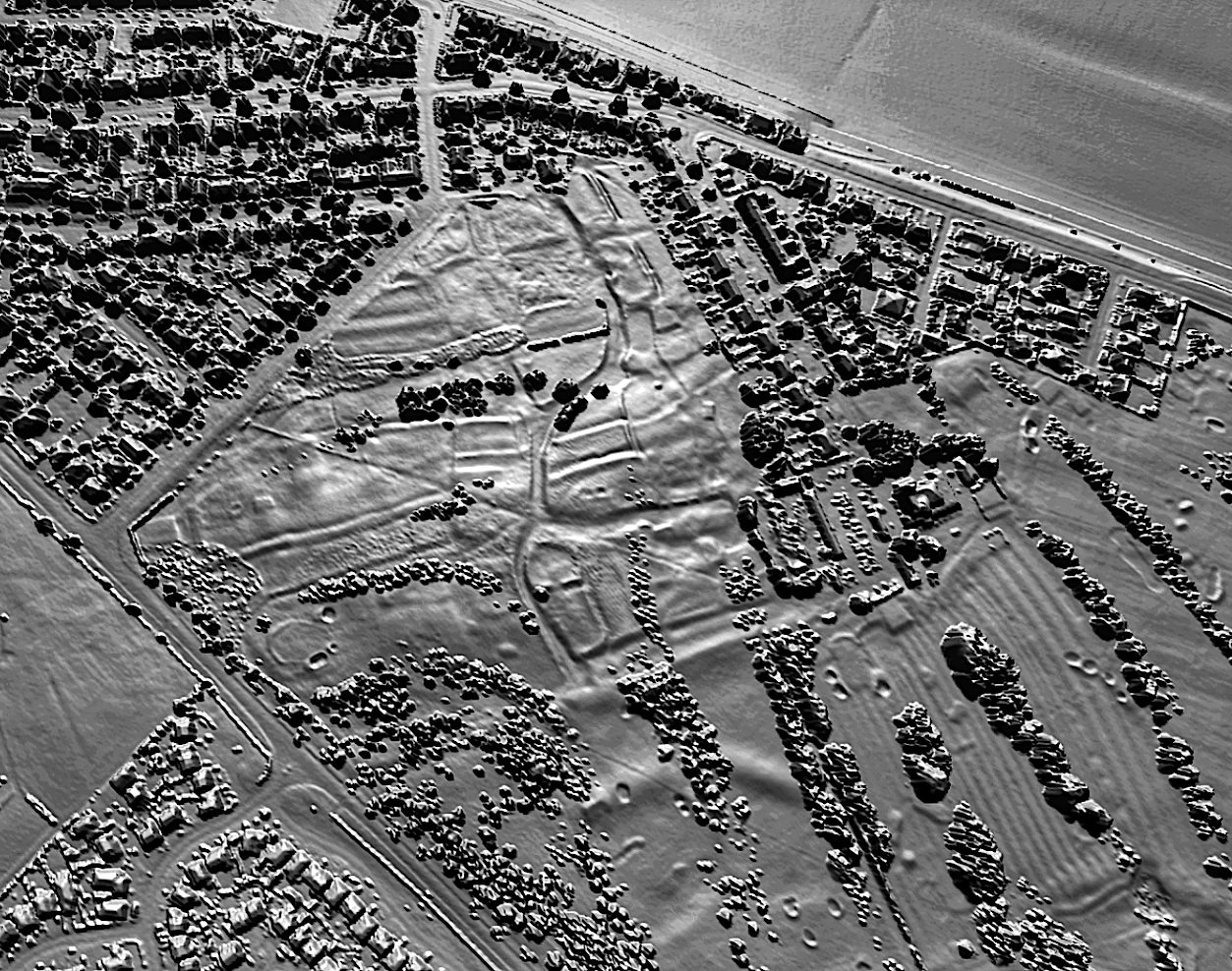
A lidar view of the site of Hilderthorpe Deserted Medieval Village in south Bridlington.

=== Corn, breweries and wars ===
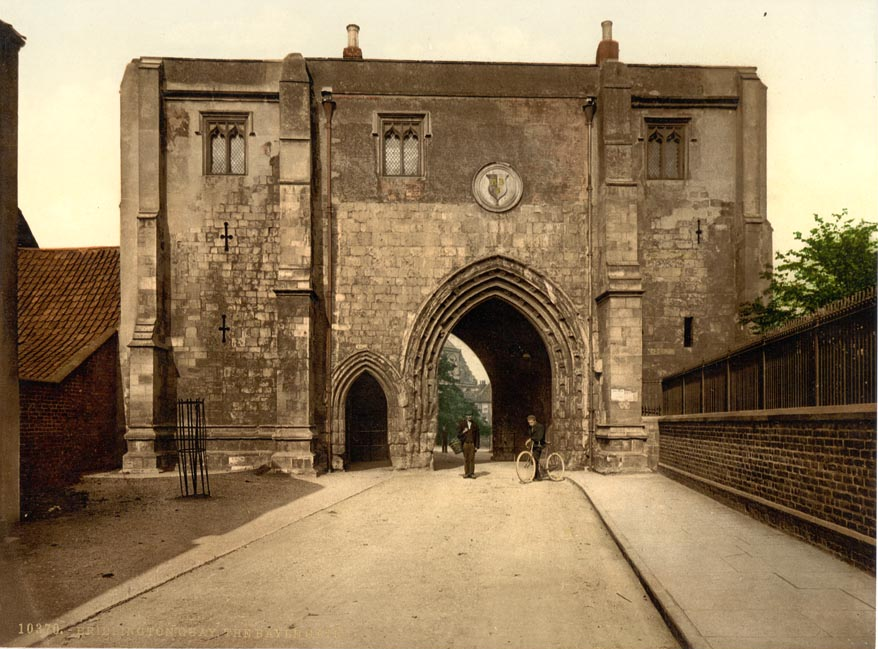
Bayle Gate

The town began to grow in importance and size around the site of the dispersed priory. In 1643 Queen Henrietta Maria of France landed there with troops to support the Royalist cause in the English Civil War, before moving on to York, which became her headquarters.

Bridlington Piers and Harbour Act 1837
- Act of Parliament
- Parliament of the United Kingdom
- Long title: An Act for improving the Piers and Harbour of Bridlington in the East Riding of the County of York, and for rendering the same more safe and commodious as a Harbour of Refuge.
- Citation: 7 Will. 4 & 1 Vict. c. cx

Dates
- Royal assent: 12 July 1837

Text of statute as originally enacted

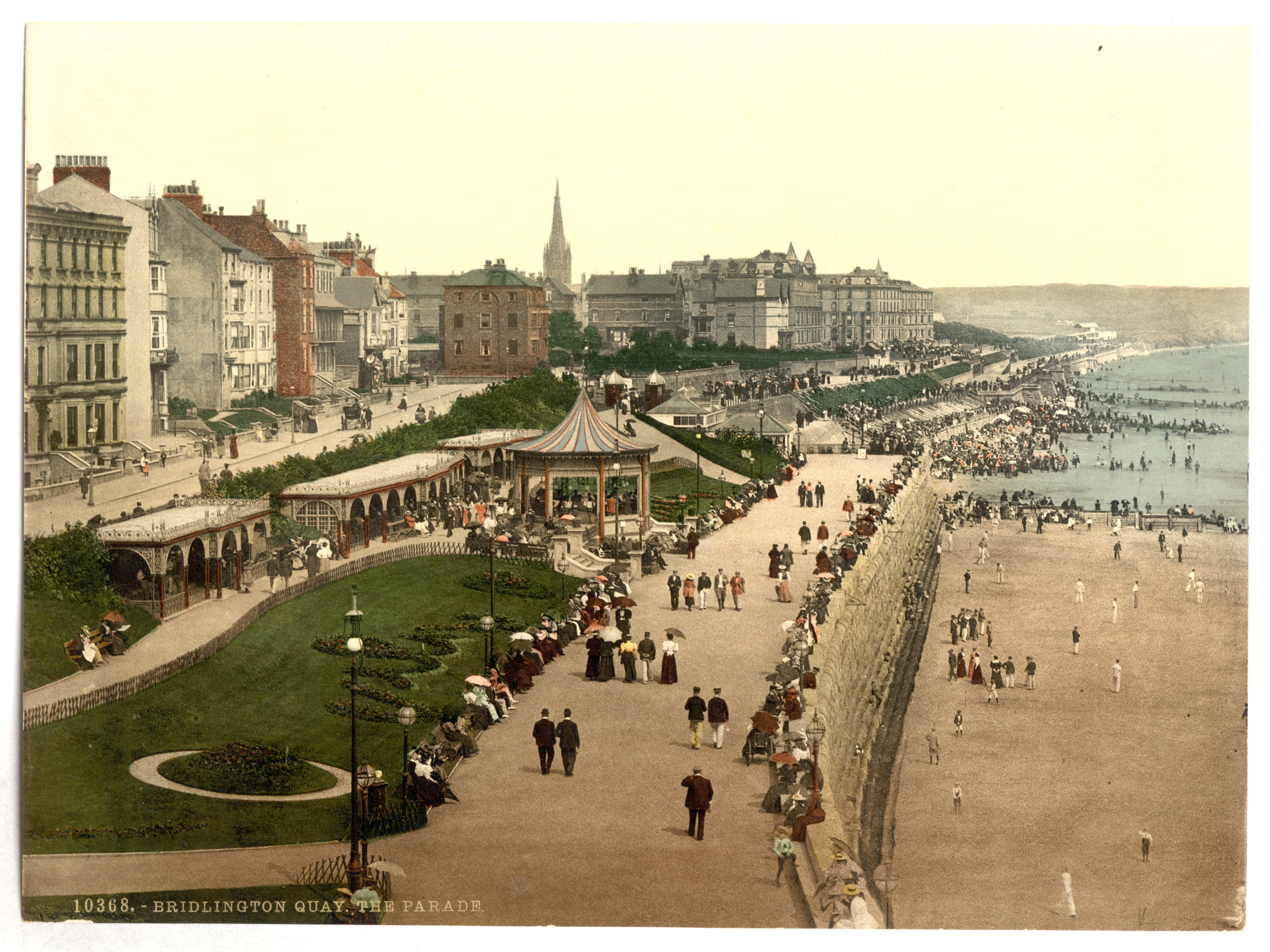
The parade (i.e., promenade) in c. 1895

The town was originally two settlements: the Old Town about one mile (1.6 km) inland and the quay area where the modern Bridlington Harbour lies. The Bridlington Piers and Harbour Act 1837 (7 Will. 4 & 1 Vict. c. cx) enabled the wooden piers to be replaced with two stone piers to the north and south. Apart from landing fish, the port was used to transport corn: Corn Exchange House can still be seen in Market Place. There used to be mills in the town for grinding it, which led to some breweries starting up locally.

In the Second World War, Bridlington suffered several air raids that caused deaths and much bomb damage. The Royal Air Force had training schools in the town collectively known as RAF Bridlington, with one unit, No. 1104 Marine Craft Unit, continuing until 1980.

The decline in the popularity of British seaside tourism in the 1960s reduced the number of pleasure steamers working from the harbour. By the end of the decade, just three were operating.

== Governance ==
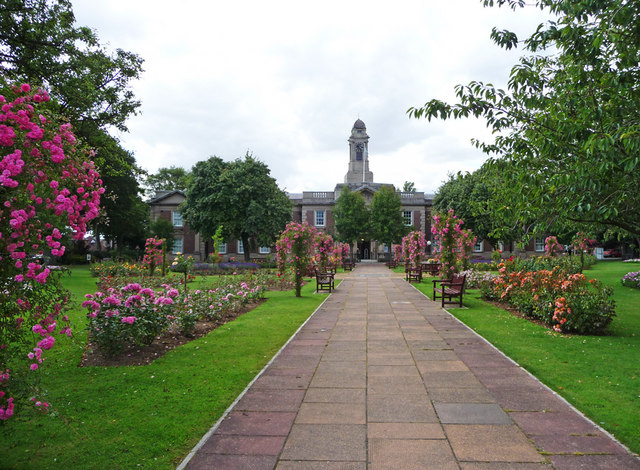
Bridlington Town Hall and the gardens around it

Bridlington is within the unitary authority of the East Riding of Yorkshire. Its three wards are Bridlington North, Bridlington South and Bridlington Old Town and Central, returning eight councillors out of 67. The civil parish consists of the town of Bridlington and the villages of Bessingby and Sewerby. It is run by a town council of twelve councillors, of which the three wards each return four.

The Town Council coat of arms is described as:

Per Sable and Argent three Gothic Capital letters B counterchanged on a Chief embattled of the second two Barrulets wavy Azure and for the Crest Issuant from a Coronet composed of eight Roses set upon a rim of a Sun rising Gules.

with the motto:

Signum Salutis Semper

meaning Always the bringer of good health.

Bridlington lies in the large Bridlington and The Wolds parliamentary constituency that covers the mostly rural, northern part of the county, including the towns of Driffield, Market Weighton and Pocklington. Its size and shape correspond to the East Yorkshire/North Wolds District under the earlier county of Humberside.

The town has been subject to several changes in parliamentary representation. From 1290 to 1831 it was part of the large Yorkshire constituency, sending two members until 1826, when it gained an additional two. Thereafter it was part of the East Riding of Yorkshire constituency until 1885, returning two members. Further reform reduced the boundaries again, to a single-member Buckrose seat until 1950. From 1950 to 1997, Bridlington had its own MP, until reform extended the boundary to include more countryside, as the single-seat East Yorkshire constituency.

Bridlington was designated a municipal borough in 1899. Local government reorganisation in 1974 included it in the new county of Humberside, which caused resentment among residents against being excluded from Yorkshire. The town became the administrative centre of a local government district, initially called the Borough of North Wolds but later changed to the Borough of East Yorkshire. The district disappeared when the county of Humberside was abolished in the 1990s, the new East Riding of Yorkshire unitary authority absorbing it and the neighbouring county districts, and Bridlington no longer having any formal local-government administrative status above town-council level.

== Geography ==
Bridlington lies 19 miles (31 km) north-north-east of Beverley, 17 miles (27 km) south-east of Scarborough, 11 miles (18 km) north-east of Driffield and 24 miles (39 km) north of Kingston upon Hull, the principal city in the county. It is 179 miles (288 km) north of London. The height above sea level ranges from the beaches to 167 feet (51 m) on Bempton Lane on the outskirts. The Gypsey Race river flows through the town, the last 1/2 mi (800 m) being below ground from the Quay Road Car Park. The solid geology of the area is mainly from the Cretaceous period, consisting of chalk overlain by Quaternary boulder clay. The chalk is exposed as the land rises to the north of the town, where a cliff, probably formed in the last interglacial, extends inland at right angles to the present sea cliff, and forms the promontory of Flamborough Head.

Bridlington is in an area said to have the highest coastal erosion rate in Europe. Southwards the coast becomes low, but northwards it is steep and very fine, where the great spur of Flamborough Head projects eastwards. The sea front is guarded by a sea wall and a wide beach with wooden groynes to trap the sand. Offshore, the Smithic Sands sandbank stretches out into the bay, as an important habitat for many marine species. Bridlington north and south beaches have won EU environmental quality awards over the years.

=== Areas of the town ===
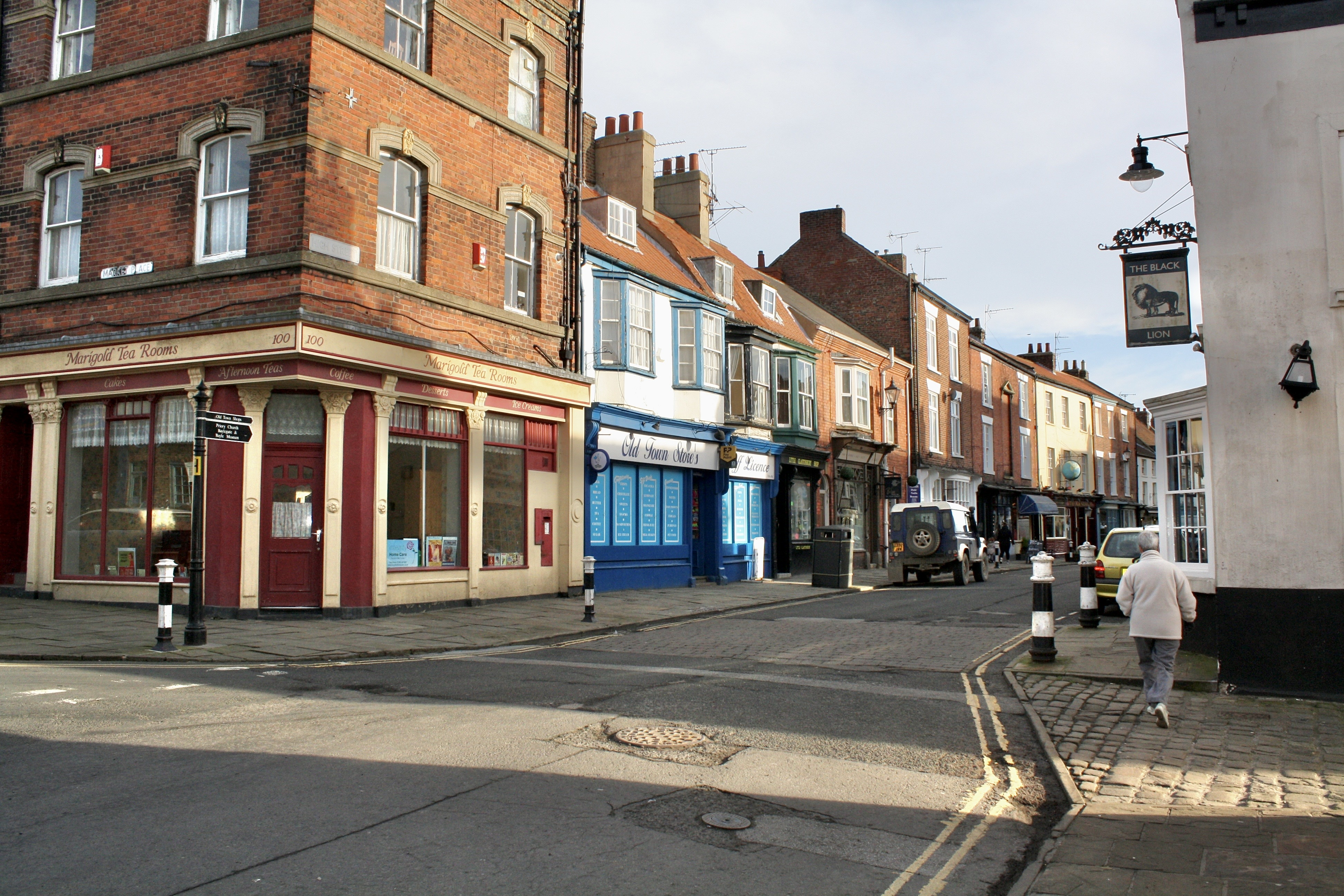
Old-town's High Street

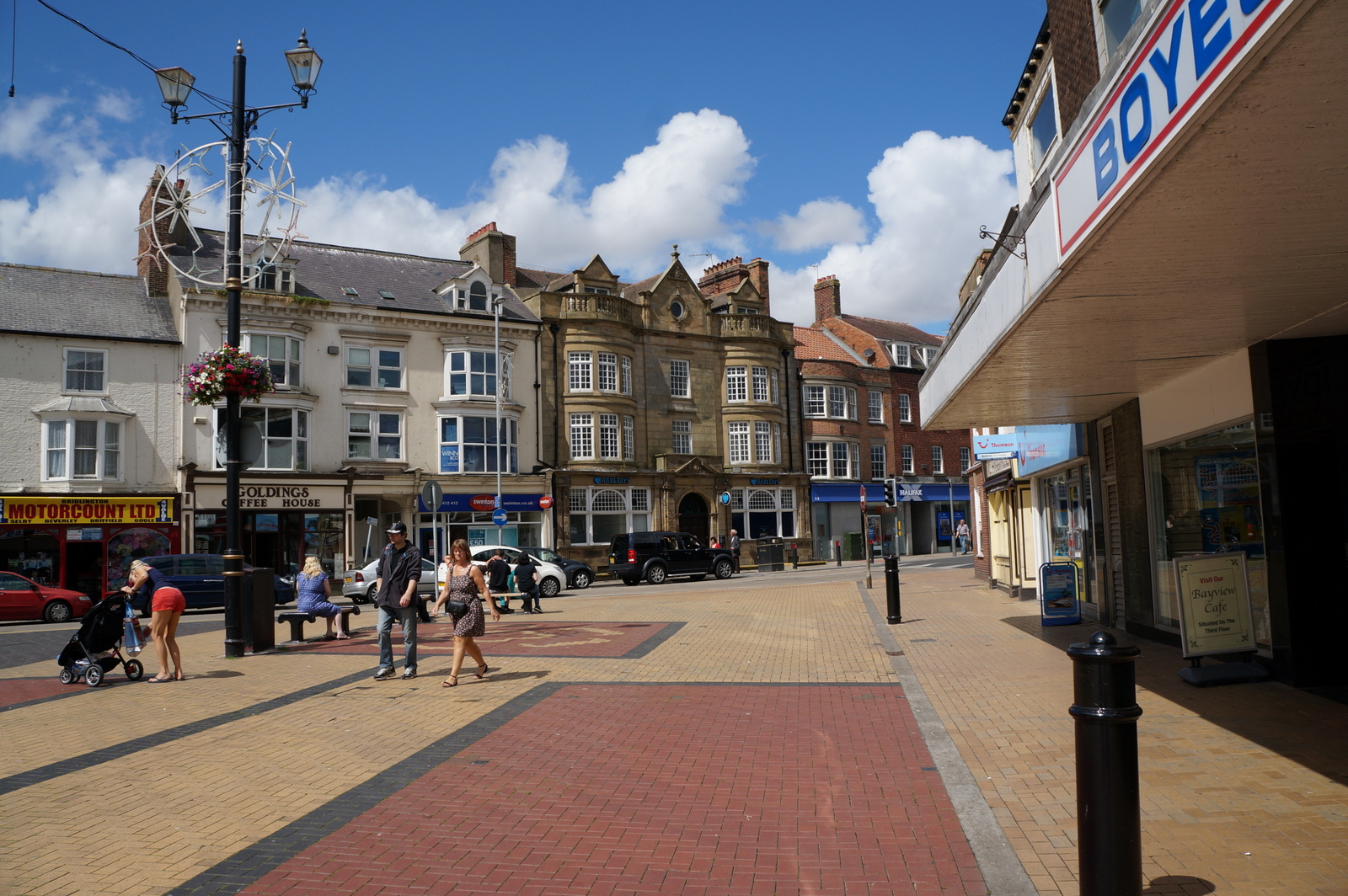
The centre's Manor Street from King Street

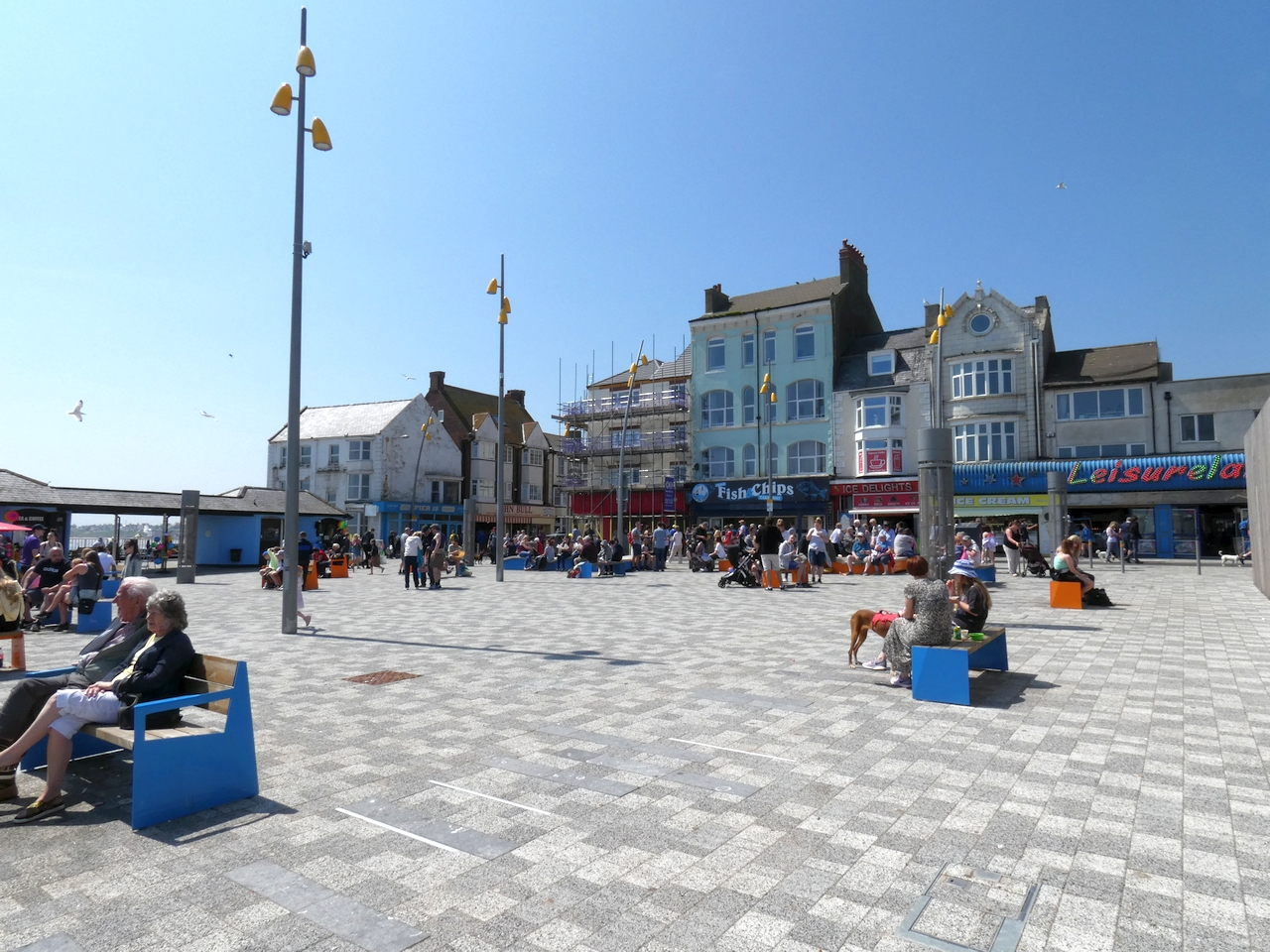
The seaside resort (Garrison Square)

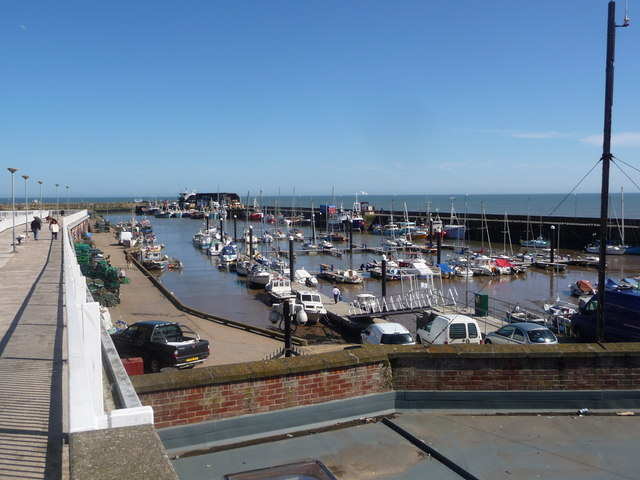
The harbour

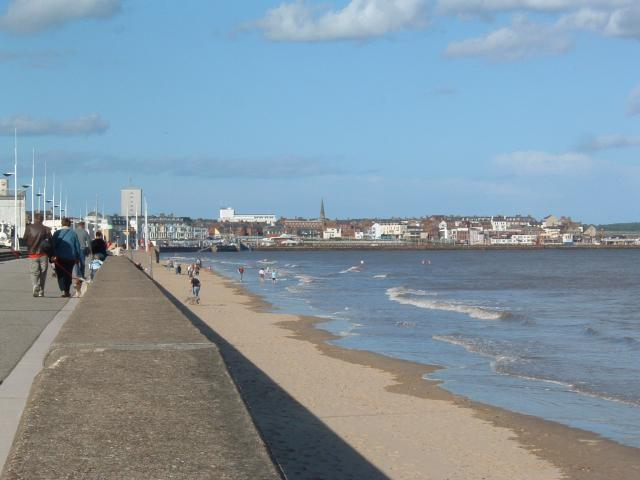
South Sands

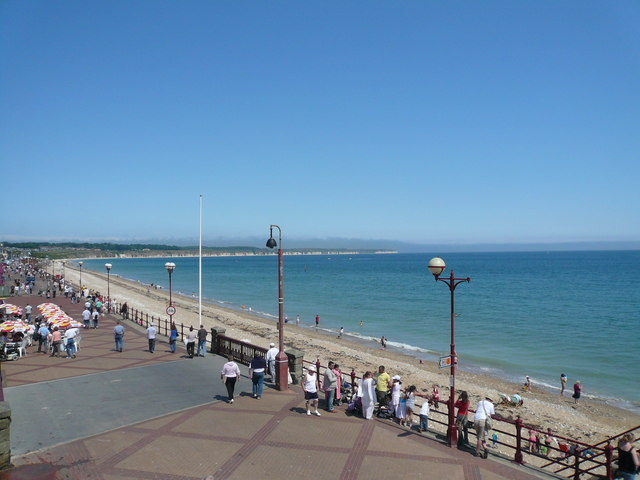
North Beach

=== Climate ===
The climate is temperate with warm summers and cool, wet winters, much like the rest of the east-northeast of England. The hottest months are from June to September, with temperatures reaching an average high of 20 °C (68 °F) and falling to 13 °C (55 °F) at night. The average daytime temperatures in winter are 8 °C (46 °F) in the day and 2 °C (36 °F) at night.

Climate data for Bridlington, 15 m asl, 1991–2020
Month	Jan	Feb	Mar	Apr	May	Jun	Jul	Aug	Sep	Oct	Nov	Dec	Year
Mean daily maximum °C (°F)	7.3 (45.1)	7.9 (46.2)	9.7 (49.5)	11.8 (53.2)	14.6 (58.3)	17.3 (63.1)	19.7 (67.5)	19.8 (67.6)	17.5 (63.5)	14.0 (57.2)	10.2 (50.4)	7.6 (45.7)	13.1 (55.6)
Mean daily minimum °C (°F)	2.3 (36.1)	2.4 (36.3)	3.4 (38.1)	5.1 (41.2)	7.7 (45.9)	10.4 (50.7)	12.5 (54.5)	12.7 (54.9)	10.9 (51.6)	8.4 (47.1)	5.0 (41.0)	2.5 (36.5)	6.9 (44.5)
Average rainfall mm (inches)	55.0 (2.17)	47.9 (1.89)	43.6 (1.72)	44.9 (1.77)	41.9 (1.65)	57.9 (2.28)	48.7 (1.92)	58.5 (2.30)	50.7 (2.00)	57.3 (2.26)	65.6 (2.58)	63.5 (2.50)	635.5 (25.04)
Average rainy days (≥ 1.0 mm)	12.0	10.7	9.6	8.4	8.1	8.9	9.0	10.1	8.6	10.9	12.3	12.6	121.2
Source: Met Office

== Demography ==
Population
Year	1801	1811	1821	1831	1841	1851	1881	1891	1901	1911	1921	1931	1951	1961	1981	1991	2001	2011
Total	3,773	4,422	5,034	5,637	6,070	6,846	6,642	6,840	10,023	11,281	16,604	19,705	24,661	26,023	28,970	32,163	33,837	35,369

=== 2001 census ===
The 2001 UK census showed a population 47.4 per cent male and 52.6 per cent female. The religious affiliations were 77 per cent Christian, 0.14 per cent Buddhist, 0.03 per cent Jewish, 0.196 per cent Hindu, 0.04 per cent Sikh, 0.22 per cent other, and the rest, over 22 per cent stating no religion or not declaring one. The ethnic make-up was 98.7 per cent White, 0.43 per cent Mixed, 0.08 per cent Black/Black British, 0.19 per cent Chinese/Other Ethnic and 0.49 per cent Asian/British Asian. There were 16,237 dwellings.

=== 2011 census ===
The 2011 UK census showed that a population split of 48.2 per cent male to 51.8 per cent female. The religious breakdown was 66.2 per cent Christian, 0.2 per cent Buddhist, 0.1 per cent Muslim, 0.1 per cent Hindu, 0.1 per cent Sikh, 0.0 per cent Other, and the remaining 33.3 per cent stating no religion or not declaring one. The ethnic make-up was 98.5 per cent White British, 0.7 per cent Mixed Ethnic, 0.2 per cent Black British, 0.5 per cent Chinese/Other Ethnic and 0.6 per cent British Asian. There were 17,827 dwellings.

== Economy ==
From the early history of Bridlington, a small fishing port grew up near the coast, later known as Bridlington Quay. After the discovery of a chalybeate spring, the Quay developed in the 19th century into a seaside resort. Bridlington's first hotel was opened in 1805 and it soon became a popular resort with industrial workers from the West Riding of Yorkshire. A new railway station opened on 6 October 1846 between the Quay and the historic town. The area round it was developed and the two areas of the town were combined.

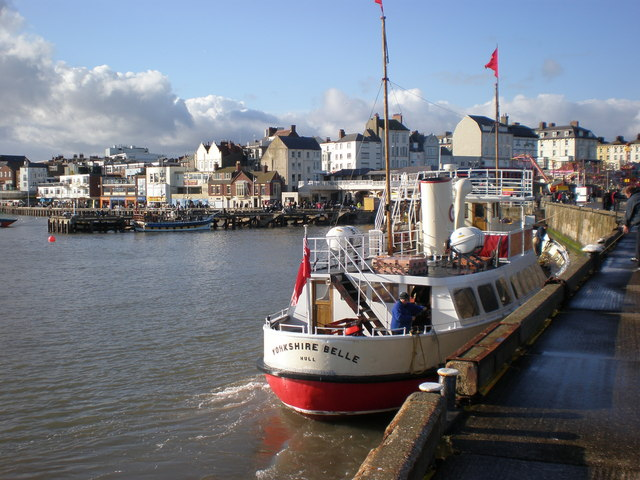
The harbour

Bridlington's popularity declined along with the industrial parts of the north and the rising popularity of cheap foreign holidays. Although the fishing fleet also declined, the port remains popular with sea anglers for trips along the coast or further out to local shipwrecks. Bridlington has lucrative shellfish exports to France, Spain and Italy, said to be worth several million pounds a year.

== Culture and community ==
The town is served by the Bridlington-based monthly Bridlington Echo newspaper, Scarborough-based weekly Bridlington Free Press and the East Riding Mail in Hull.

Local radio stations are BBC Radio Humberside, Hits Radio East Yorkshire & North Lincolnshire, Nation Radio East Yorkshire, Capital Yorkshire, Greatest Hits Radio Yorkshire Coast, This is The Coast and Bridlington Gold Radio, a community based station.

Local news and television programmes are provided by BBC Yorkshire and Lincolnshire and ITV Yorkshire. Television signals are received from the Belmont TV transmitter.

Jake Thackray's song "The Hair of the Widow of Bridlington" mocks Bridlington for the ostensible small-mindedness of its inhabitants.

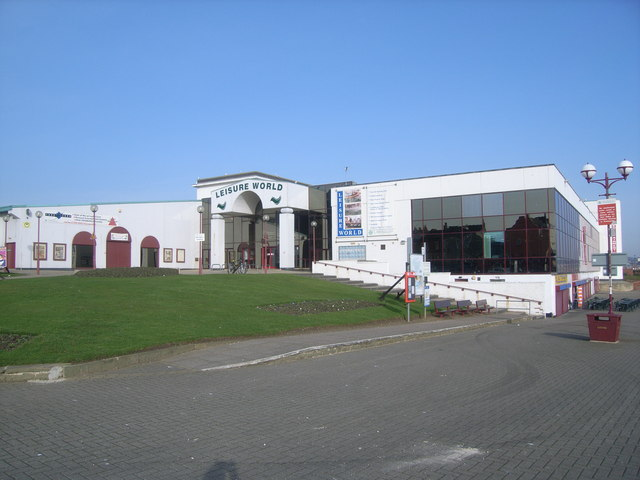
Leisure World leisure centre before demolition

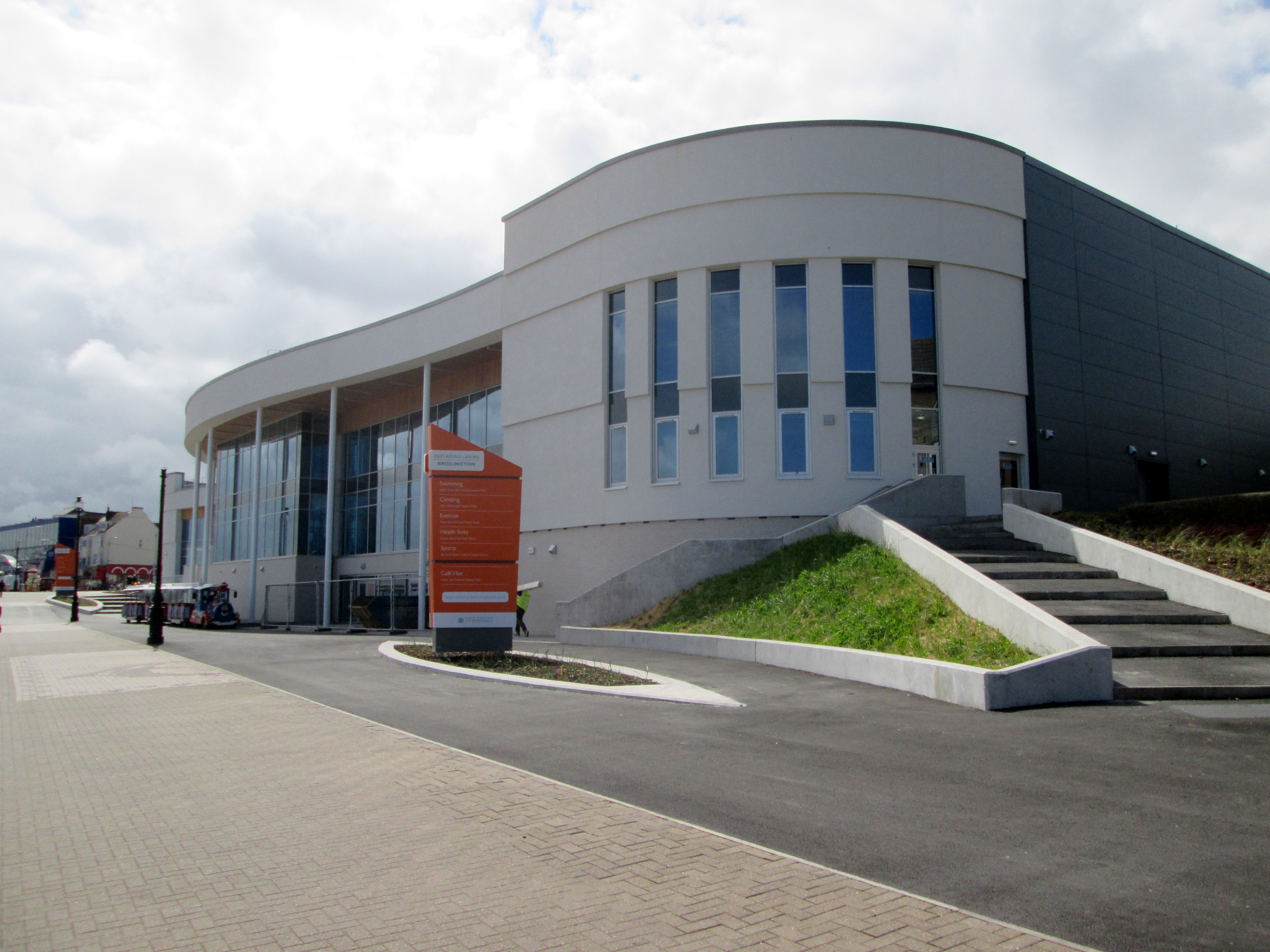
The replacement leisure centre opened in May 2016

There are three main parks. Queen's Park is a small open area at the junction of the B1254 and Queensgate. Westgate Park is a mostly wooded area between Westgate and the A165 on the outskirts of the town. The largest open area is Duke's Park, between Queensgate and the railway line. It hosts Bridlington Sports and Community Club, a skate park and Bridlington Town Football Club. In addition, there is a Sports Centre on the outskirts, in Gypsey Road, with a general-purpose sports hall, a gymnasium and squash courts. In January 2014, Bridlington Leisure World on the Promenade, with its swimming facilities, gymnasium and indoor bowling rinks, closed for redevelopment. A temporary Olympic legacy pool was opened by Jo Jackson in January 2014 at the Bridlington Sports Centre on Gypsey Road, while Leisure World was rebuilt. The new centre opened on 23 May 2016, with an official opening on 1 July 2016 by Rebecca Adlington, Gail Emms and Dean Windass.

The town has a public library in King Street. Within the triangle of Station Avenue, Station Road and Quay Road are the Town Hall, Magistrates Court and several other government buildings. On South Marine Drive there is an RNLI Life Boat Station. There has been a life boat since 1805, crewed wholly by volunteers. It received a new Shannon-class lifeboat in 2018, with some redevelopment to accommodate it.

Close to the A165/A614 junction is Bridlington Hospital and the Ambulance Station. On the opposite side, closer to the town centre, is the fire station, established in 1960, with a mix of full-time and on-call crew. There is a post office and depot not far from the level crossing in Quay Road.

=== Town crier ===
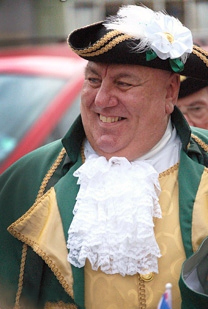
Town Crier David Hinde of Bempton

David Hinde, who lived in the nearby village of Bempton and was a member of the Ancient and Honourable Guild of Town Criers and the Loyal Company of Town Criers, was appointed in the Queen's Diamond Jubilee Year of 2012 by Bridlington Town Council. He was the first town crier in Bridlington since 1901. On 23 July 2013 Hinde gave a special proclamation outside Bridlington Priory, before a visit from Prince Charles and Camilla, Duchess of Cornwall as part of the special "Priory 900" celebrations.

On 17 August 2013, at the town's Sewerby Park, Hinde's cry was recorded at 114.8 decibels. He appeared as the Walmington-on-Sea town crier in the 2016 film Dad's Army.

== Landmarks ==
Bridlington Priory, also known as the Priory Church of St Mary, is a Grade I listed building named after the Augustinian Priory on which it was built. It was once fortified; the Bayle (gate) nearby is what remains of that fortification and also a Grade I listed building. It has a ring of eight bells (tenor c. 24 cwt, 05 t) with a long draft. It also has a large four-manual organ that boasts the widest "scaled" 32-foot reed (contra tuba) in the United Kingdom. Bridlington's war memorial is located in a triangular patch of garden at the junction of Prospect Street and Wellington Road. It was unveiled on 10 July 1921 by Captain S. H. Radcliffe, C. M. G., R. N.

Bridlington Cemetery in Sewerby Road dates from the 19th century and includes 73 Commonwealth War Graves. The Grade II listed Gothic cemetery chapels, gatehouse and lodge were built in 1869 by the architect Alfred Smith of Nottingham.

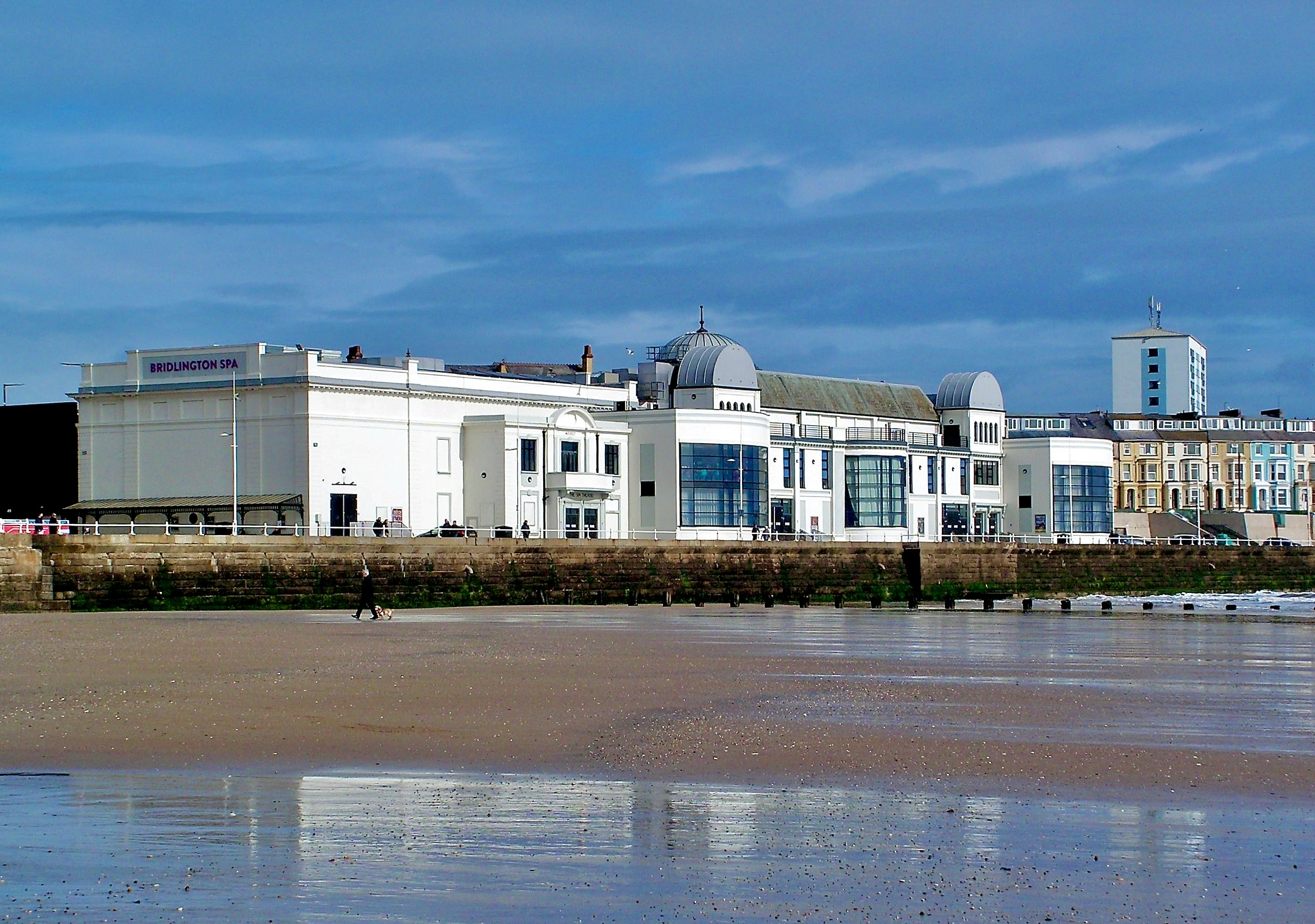
The spa building

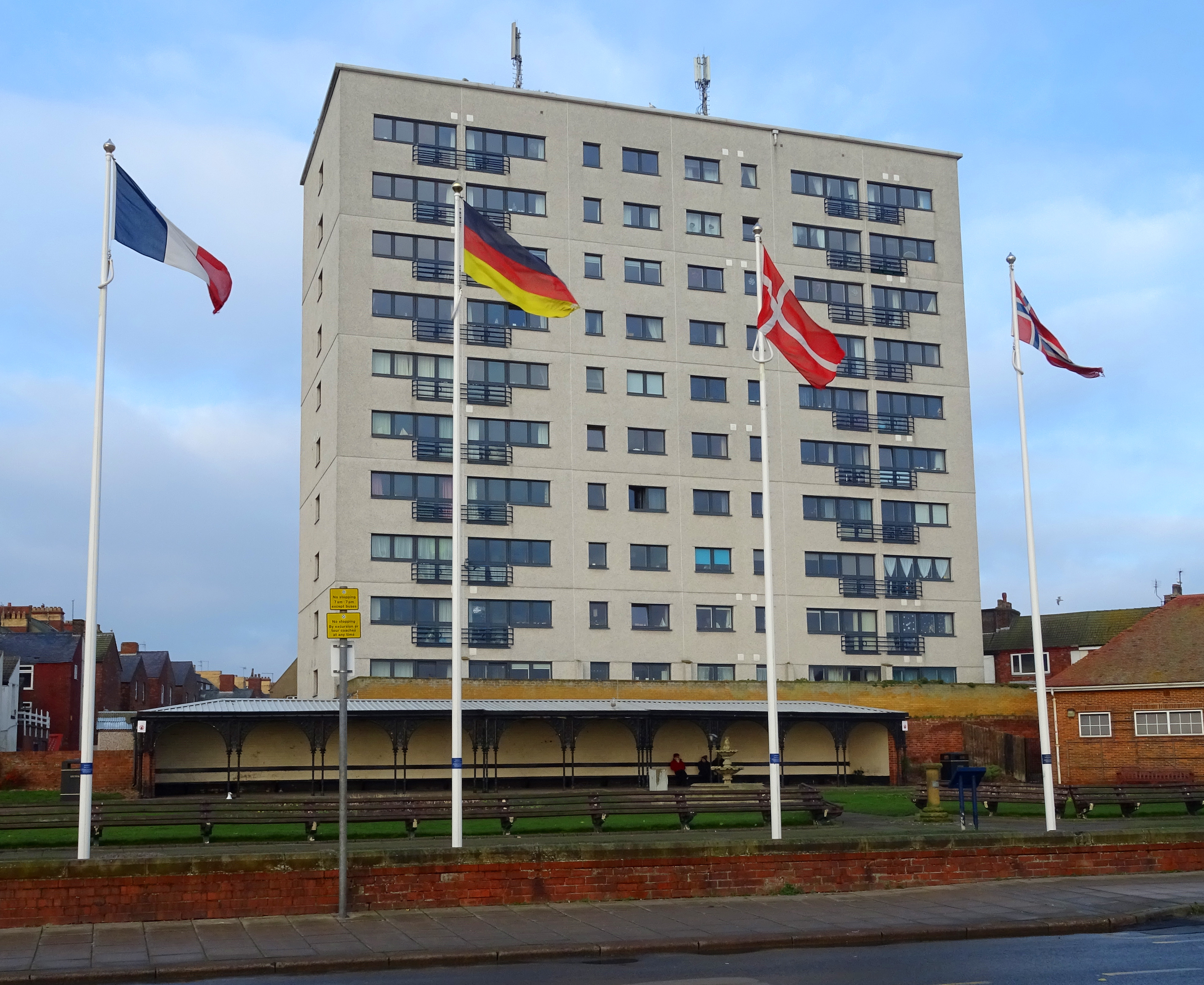
Ebor House is the town's tallest building

Bridlington Spa opened in 1896, when Bridlington in its heyday was a leading entertainment resort and a nationally famous dance venue, where many well-known entertainers appeared, including David Bowie and Morrissey. By 2005 the condition of the building had deteriorated to a point where East Riding of Yorkshire Council had to undertake a thorough refurbishment in 2006–2008. It has since begun to attract well-known names again: in 2013 indie rock bands the Kaiser Chiefs and Kasabian, Irish band The Script and Joe McElderry all performed there.

In 2014 blue plaques went up for Herman Darewski, composer and conductor of light music, and Wallace Hartley, leader of the orchestra playing as the Titanic sank. Hartley had led an orchestra in the town in 1902. Darewski was musical director for the town in 1924–1926 and 1933–1939.

Bridlington has several notable public artworks along the seafront. 'Promenade' by Bruce McLean and Mel Gooding with architects Bauman Lyon runs the length of the South Foreshore and encompasses beach huts, a metal sculpture and public showers as well as a nautical mile of text that references aspects of the locale. It was completed in 1998 and won the RIBA 'Building of the Year'.

== Transport ==
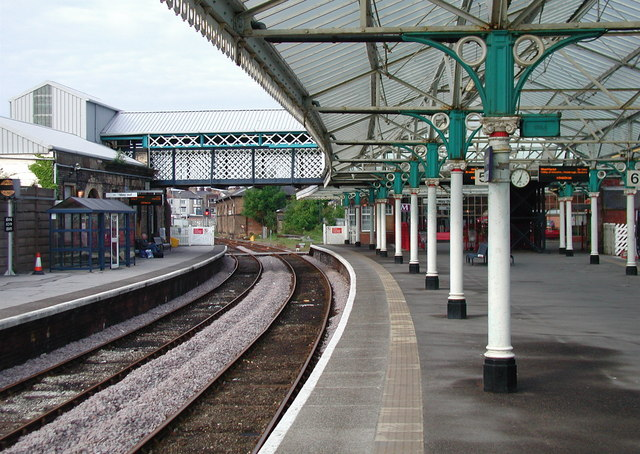
Bridlington Station

Bridlington is served by a railway station on the Yorkshire Coast Line between Hull and Scarborough. It opened on 6 October 1846 between the Quay and the Old Town.

East Yorkshire Motor Services has a depot, running nine local and six out-of-town bus routes, including York, Scarborough, Driffield, Beverley and Hull. The company operates a summer Beachcomber open-top bus service in Bridlington. Yorkshire Coastliner runs a service to Filey, Malton, York, Tadcaster and Leeds.

The town lies at the junction of two trunk roads: the A165 between Hull and Scarborough and the A614 between Bridlington and Nottingham. The A614 was extended in 1996 to include the length previously known as the A166 to York.

Four land trains run in Bridlington: the Yorkshire Rose, Yorkshire Lass and Yorkshire Lad and the Spalight Express. Two run on the North Promenade between Leisure World and Sewerby Hall and Gardens linking Bridlington town centre with the summer car parks. One runs on the South Promenade linking Bridlington town centre to the park and ride and South Cliff Caravan Park. In the 1970s and 1980s there were two other trains — the Burlington Bertie and Bridlington Belle.

== Education ==
=== Primary ===
Bridlington civil parish has seven primary schools, counting Burlington Infant and Junior together. All are mixed gender, for pupils between three or four and eleven years of age.

Bay Primary School in St Alban Road had 335 pupils in 2013. Burlington Infant School in Marton Road had 239. Burlington Junior School, also in Marton Road, had 320 pupils. Hilderthorpe Primary School in Shaftesbury Road had 328 pupils. Martongate Primary School in Martongate had 424 pupils. Quay Academy in Oxford Street had 390 pupils. Our Lady and Saint Peter RC Primary academy, built in 1977 (formerly St Mary's R.C. Primary School) is located in George Street and had 210 pupils. New Pasture Lane Primary School in Burstall Hill had 177 pupils.

=== Secondary ===
Bridlington School is a mixed-gender specialist Sports and Design and Technology College for 11–18-year-olds. Located in Bessingby Road on the outskirts of the town, it had a 2013 capacity of 1,244 pupils. There have been many notable past pupils.

Headlands School in Sewerby Road caters for mixed-gender eleven to 18-year-olds. It partners the town's other secondary school and had a 2013 capacity of 1,485 pupils.

=== Further and higher education ===
East Riding College provides tertiary education for students from 16. Located in St Mary's Walk, it is close to Bay Primary School. Courses cover both academic and vocational subjects.

== Health service ==
All six GP practices closed their lists to new patients in 2016 due to problems with premises and staff shortages. The town has an elderly population, which adds to demand. In May 2018 they were obliged by NHS England to reopen their lists, but there was no funding for a proposed Health and Wellbeing Centre, which was to have housed five surgeries. In October 2022 it was announced that three of the five practices would be closed because of challenges recruiting and retaining staff. Two larger practices, Humber Primary Care and Practice Three will take over and each serve around 19,000 patients.

== Religious sites ==
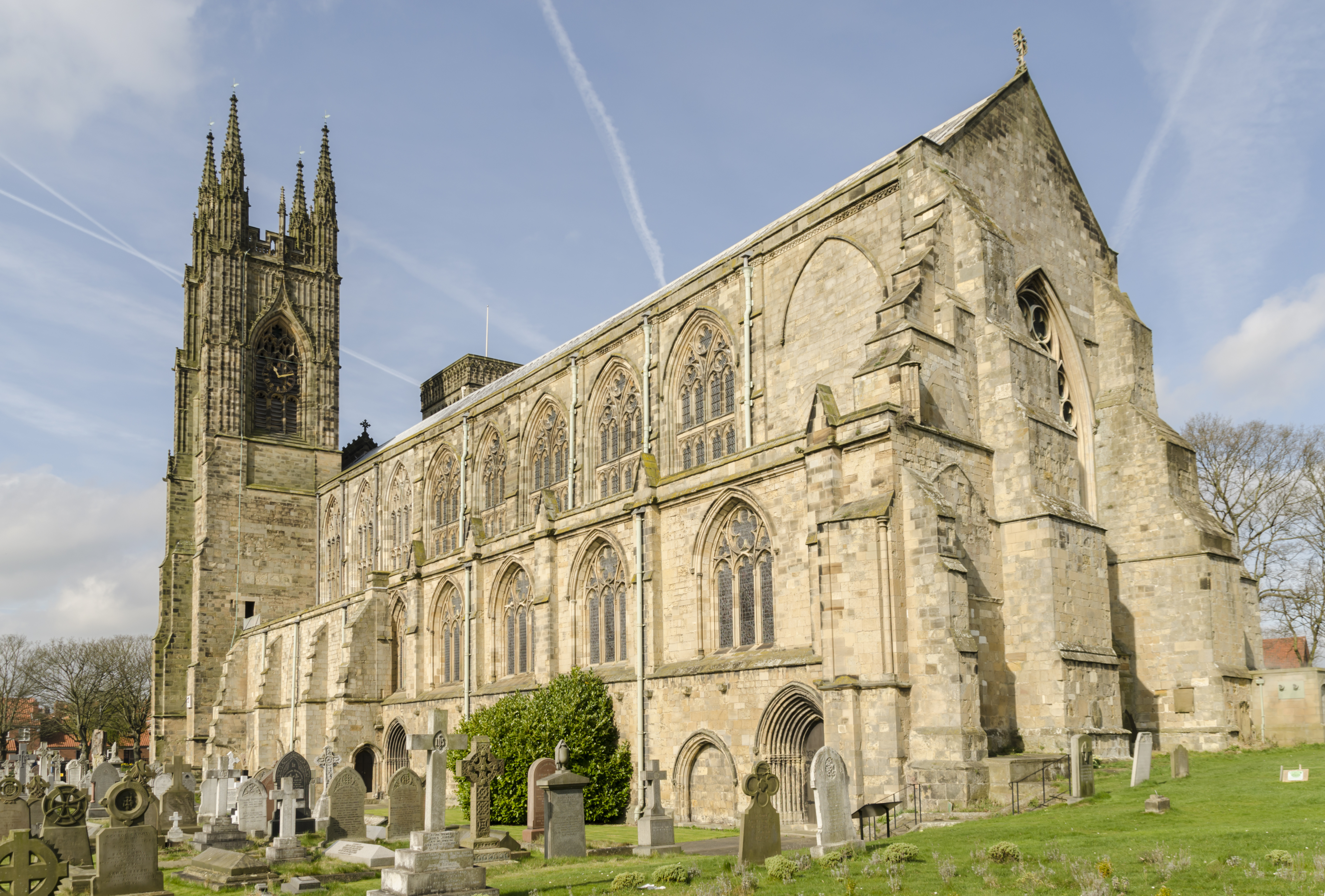
Bridlington Priory

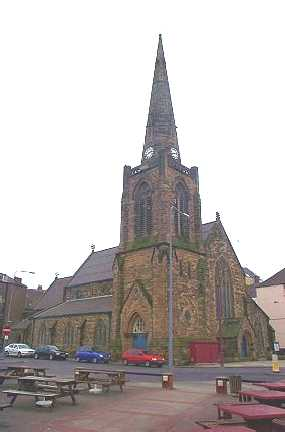
Holy Trinity Church (Church of England)

The main Anglican place of worship is the Priory Church of St Mary in Church Green. Christ Church in Quay Road, next to the war memorial, was built in 1841 by Gilbert Scott. Originally a chapel of ease, it became a parish church in 1871 and is now a Grade II listed building. Emmanuel Church in Cardigan Road is a modern red-brick building, also part of the Church of England.

The Harbourside Evangelical Church stands in a side road off Bridge Street. The Kingdom Hall of Jehovah's Witnesses is in Station Avenue. The Cornerstone Church, once known as The Chapel Hall, is an Evangelical Church in St John's Walk. There has been a Baptist church in the town since 1698, the current place of worship being on the corner of Quay Road and Portland Place. On the corner of St John Street and Brett Street is the Free Presbyterian Church. The independent Evangelical Church in Ferndale Terrace is called Calvary Chapel by the Sea.

The strong Methodist Church presence in the town since 1770 is covered in various locations. St John's Burlington Methodist Church in St John's Street remains. The chapel in the Promenade lasted from 1852 until 1957 as part of the United Methodist Free Church. The Primitive Methodists established a chapel in St John Street in 1833, but moved to a nearby location in 1849. This in turn was rebuilt in 1877 and lasted until 1970. The Primitive Methodists also had a chapel known as the Central Methodist Church on the Quay in 1833. It moved to Chapel Street in 1870 and built itself larger premises there in 1878. In 1969 it joined with the Chapel Street Methodist Church, which was in existence in 1810 in what was originally Back Street. This was rebuilt in 1873 and lasted until 1999, when it became the final Methodist congregation to unite with the present church.

The Roman Catholic Church of Our Lady and St Peter stands in Victoria Road. The Catholics had long lacked a permanent mission in the town. A previous 1886 building in Wellington Road had not provided sufficient space when a mission was eventually granted. Modern premises were built in 1893–1894 by Arthur Lowther. The church hall adjacent was added in 1963. The connection to the sea is evident on the dedication to Our Lady, also known as the Star of the Sea, and to St Peter, Patron Saint of Fishermen. The convent in the High Street is associated with the church and though now run by the Sisters of Mercy, was originally Dominican.

== Sport ==
The town has a semi-professional football club, Bridlington Town A.F.C., founded in 1918, refounded in 1994, and now playing in the Northern Counties East League Premier Division (NCEL). Its home ground is a stadium in Queensgate. The team's honours include the FA Vase in 1993, three NCEL Premier Division titles and 15 East Riding Senior Cup's. The town also has a junior football club, Bridlington Rangers, with teams playing in various age groups of the Hull Boys Sunday Football League. Bridlington Sports Club plays in the Humber Premier League. Bridlington Rovers F.C. formed in 1903, is the oldest club in the town & run a number of teams.

A now defunct club, Bridlington Trinity, enjoyed league success in the Yorkshire League and Midland League respectively.

Bridlington Cricket Club play in the York and District Senior League Division 1, and also run three Saturday league teams and junior teams.

Bridlington Rugby Union Football Club are neighbours of Bridlington Town AFC, at Dukes Park, fielding two senior men's teams, a women's team and numerous junior sections. The men's 1st XV played in Yorkshire 1 for the 2019 season, after spending three years in North East 1. They reached the final of the RFU Intermediate Cup at Twickenham on 4 May 2013, losing 22–30 to Brighton Blues.

Bridlington Hockey Club has existed for over a century. It currently plays home matches at Bridlington Astro Centre in Bessingby Road, and also field two ladies' sides and a junior development section for girls and boys. An annual hockey festival is held, with both men's and women's tournaments. A new format added to the festival for 2014 gave chances for men and women to play together.

Other sports played around Bridlington include tennis, pétanque, sand racing fencing and archery.

Bridlington hosted the first Tour de Yorkshire in 2015, the start of the first stage in 2017 and the start of the third stage in 2019.

Bridlington Spa is host to the popular British Open darts championships.

== Notable people ==
=== Natives ===
- William of Newburgh, a 12th-century English chronicler and historian, was born in Bridlington.
- William Kent (1686–1748), architect, landscape architect and furniture designer, was born in the town.
- Sir John Major, 1st Baronet of Worthlingworth Hall was born in Bridlington in 1698. The merchant and member of Parliament died in 1781.
- Benjamin Fawcett, a woodblock colour printer and ornithologist, was born in the town in 1808.
- Henry Freeman was a Whitby fisherman and lifeboatman born in the town.
- A. E. Matthews, stage and film actor, was born in Bridlington in 1869. He featured in the 1956 version of Around the World in 80 days, Doctor at Large and Carry On Admiral.
- Thomas Fenby, a Liberal politician and blacksmith, was born in the town in 1875. He acted as Mayor of Bridlington and represented the town as MP. He died at his Bridlington home in 1956.
- Cecil Burton (1887–1971), cricketer and former Yorkshire County Cricket Club captain, was born in the town, as was his younger brother Claude Burton (1891–1971), who also played for Yorkshire.
- Francis Johnson (1911–1995), born in Bridlington, was a renowned church architect.
- Gordon Lakes, former Deputy Director General of the Prison Service, was born in the town in 1928. He is credited with helping to achieve improved working conditions among UK prisons.
- Bob Wallis (1934–1991), jazz musician, was born in Bridlington. He had some success in the British charts in the late 1950s and early 60s. His father was harbourmaster in the town.
- David Pinkney, businessman and auto racing driver competing in the British Touring Car Championships, was born in the town on 5 July 1952.
- Andrew Dismore, the Labour politician and lawyer was born in the town on 2 September 1954. He was educated at Bridlington School.
- Mark Herman, film director and screenwriter, was born in the town in 1954. Among his best-known works are Brassed Off, Little Voice and The Boy in the Striped Pyjamas.
- Angela Eagle and her twin sister Maria Eagle, both Labour politicians, were born in the town on 17 February 1961.
- Craig Short, professional footballer and manager, born in Bridlington on 25 June 1968, has played at top levels in both the English and Turkish league systems, including Derby County, Everton, and Blackburn.
- Richard Cresswell, professional football player, was born in Bridlington on 20 September 1977. He started with York City F.C., before playing in higher divisions of the league system.
- Adam Khan, racing driver, was born in the town on 24 May 1985.
- Charlie Heaton, actor and musician, is known for playing Jonathan Byers in the Netflix supernatural drama series Stranger Things.
- Stephen W. Parsons, musician, composer, songwriter and music producer
- Rosie Jones, comedian and writer
- Leon Cole, actor, comedian and filmmaker

=== Residents ===
- John Twenge (St John of Bridlington), a 14th-century English saint, was a Canon of Bridlington Priory. He was born less than 10 miles (16 km) from the town in Thwing.
- David Hockney used to own a house in Bridlington, at which an assistant drank a cleaning product and died in March 2013.
- Malcolm McDowell, actor, lived in Bridlington as a child, where McDowell's father was stationed at the nearby RAF Carnaby.

== Twin towns – sister cities ==
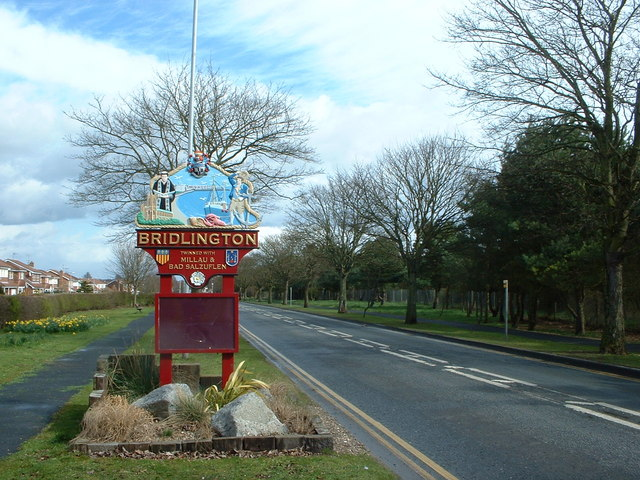
Welcome to Bridlington sign with the two twin towns

Bridlington is twinned with:

- Bad Salzuflen, Germany
- Millau, France

The town's entrance sign shows the twin town names to motorists.

== See also ==
- Burlington, Ontario was named after Bridlington by John Graves Simcoe.
- Burlington, New Jersey was named after Bridlington.
- Burlington County, New Jersey was named after Bridlington.
