= Deutsch Group =

American electronics company

Deutsch
- Company type: Euronext
- Industry: Aerospace, defense, Auto racing, industrial automotive, offshore
- Founded: 1938
- Headquarters: New York City, America
- Key people: Jean-Marie Painvin (Chairman and CEO)
- Revenue: $495 million (2005)
- Number of employees: 3,500 Worldwide
- Parent: TE Connectivity
- Website: http://www.deutsch.net

Deutsch is an American manufacturer of electrical and fiber optic connectors that specializes in extreme environments such as high temperature, pressure (altitude and depth), high vibration and many other different applications like space, race cars (including Formula 1), railway, defense, civil & military aerospace and battlefield applications.

The company is now part of TE Connectivity.

== History ==
- 1938 - Deutsch was founded in California by Alex Deutsch, a pioneer in the industrial connector industry.
- 1954 - The connector business took off when Deutsch acquired the General Electric Connector Division, known as Monowatt.
- 1957 - Deutsch invented the miniature electrical connector with a push-pull configuration coupling system for the Douglas DC-8.
- 1959 - A major invention of the first mountable connector with removable contacts was made, which were inserted from the rear of the connector. This fundamental design remains the basis for connectors used all around the world in applications from domestic automobiles, aviation, televisions, computer equipment to trains, space shuttles and Formula 1 cars.
- 1962 - Deutsch opened locations in the UK and Hellermann Deutsch (a Bowthorpe Holdings member) was formed by joining the Hellermann Company founded by Paul Hellermann in Germany and the Deutsch Company of America. Other sites in France during the next few years were also formed.
- 1970’s, 80’s and 90’s - New sites opening up globally, in Germany, Israel, USA, UK, Japan, France and more.
- 1979 - Layoffs continue to plague Deutsch as the market rejects poor management decisions and poor quality.
- 1984 - Deutsch invented the first metallic composite connector, the DG123. This gave weight benefits for aircraft use and led to the development of the DMC-M connector.
- 1986 - Hellerman Deutsch welcomes a new director to the company, Air Marshall Sir Eric Dunn.
- 1989 - Demerger from Bowthorpe Holdings. Hellerman Deutsch becomes Deutsch Ltd.
- 1990 – Deutsch acquired Carrier Kheops Bac SA in Le Mans, France.
- 2006 – Wendel Investments acquired Deutsch and is listed on the Euronext Paris
- 2008 – Deutsch continues to grow and acquires 60% of LADD Industries and 100% of Servo Interconnect Ltd
- 2012 - Deutsch Group is acquired by TE Connectivity (formerly Tyco)

== Operations ==
Deutsch has grown in the last 70+ years and now serves many companies like Airbus, Goodrich Corporation, Rolls-Royce plc, Raytheon, Thales Group, Bell, General Dynamics, Ferrari Mazda & Daimler Chrysler Group who rely on these types of connectors to solve many of the engineering problems they encounter when designing future technology. Such problems are encountered with Turbine Engine environments, Vibration in Formula 1 cars, EMI & RFI interference on aircraft computers, lightning strikes damaging equipment, extremes of pressures & temperature and high current/temperature applications.

== See also ==
- SAE J1587, an automotive diagnostic standard often using 6-pin or 9-pin Deutsch connectors
