= Eric Dunn =

Royal Air Force Air Marshal

Sir Eric Dunn
- Born: 27 November 1927; Winchester, Hampshire
- Died: 16 July 2008 (aged 80)
- Military career
- Allegiance: United Kingdom
- Branch: Royal Air Force
- Service years: 1944–1986
- Rank: Air Marshal
- Commands: RAF St Athan (1976–77)
- Conflicts: Second World War; Korean War; Falklands War
- Awards: Knight Commander of the Order of the British Empire; Companion of the Order of the Bath; British Empire Medal

Air Marshal Sir Eric Clive Dunn, KBE, CB, BEM, CEng, FRAeS (27 November 1927 – 16 July 2008) was a senior Royal Air Force officer.

Born in Winchester on 27 November 1927 to the son of Royal Air Force Wing Commander he was educated at Bridlington School, East Riding of Yorkshire, and joined the RAF as an aircraft apprentice in February 1944.

Following three years at No 1 Radio School at RAF Cranwell, Dunn graduated in second place as a radio fitter (air). At this point, he missed his first opportunity for an RAF commission, being very unlucky not to be selected for a cadetship. Dunn won his colours every year in rugby and cricket, excelling to win the Victor Ludorum shield for outstanding sportsmanship.

Dunn was soon posted to Hong Kong to work on the flying boats, where Dunn volunteered for many missions during the Korean War. Dunn was an essential member for the crew in many of the missions as they lasted so long – some up to eighteen hours, and Dunn was responsible for the maintenance of the on-board navigation, electrical and radio equipment. Due to his efforts Dunn, then a corporal, was award the British Empire Medal (BEM).

After returning to England in 1951, Dunn was selected for a commission within the engineering branch of the RAF.

Dunn retired in July 1986 and for four years was a director at Deutsch (then, Hellerman Deutsch).

Dunn died on 16 July 2008 aged 80, leaving his wife and three daughters.
