= Lords Feoffees =

The Lords Feoffees and Assistants of the Manor of Bridlington
- Founded: 1636
- Type: charitable trust
- Location: Bridlington, England
- Region served: Bridlington
- Employees: 14
- Website: Official website
- Registered Charity number: 252207

The charitable trust known as The Lords Feoffees and Assistants of the Manor of Bridlington, based in Bridlington, East Riding of Yorkshire, England, was created in 1636.

The Manor of Bridlington had been confiscated by Henry VIII from the monks of Bridlington Priory during the Dissolution of the Monasteries, in 1537. In 1624 James I conferred the Manor on Sir J. Ramsey, recently created Earl of Holderness, "as a reward for the great services the earl had performed by delivering his majesty from the conspirators of the Gowries, and also for the better support of the high dignity to which he had been lately raised".

On inheriting it, his son Sir George Ramsey of Coldstream sold it in 1633 for £3,260 to William Corbett and twelve other inhabitants of Bridlington, to administrate it on behalf of themselves and all the other tenants and freeholders of the Manor. A deed, bearing the date 6 May 1636, was drawn up declaring these citizens as Lords Feoffees (Note: Feoffee is a Medieval word meaning freeholder.) of the Manor of Bridlington, and empowering them to enrol twelve more Assistants.

Lords Feoffees and Assistants continue to fulfill their original charter by donating money (earned from rent from the many properties they continue to own in the old town centre) to causes in Bridlington, for example the funding of the offshore D CLass D 557 RNLI lifeboat Lord Feoffees III at Bridlington lifeboat station, and the awarding of bursaries and scholarships to students from Bridlington.

The Feoffees were also directed to elect one of their number annually as chief Lord of the Manor, in whose name the courts should be called and the business of the town transacted. The election is still continued on the second day of February, and a manor court is held in the Town Hall in February and November.

The Courthouse and Town Hall of the Lords Feoffees is currently used as a museum, The Bayle Museum, dedicated to the history of the Lords and the townsfolk of Bridlington.
