= RAF Holyhead =

Former Royal Air Force station in Wales

RAF Holyhead
- Near Holyhead, Anglesey in Wales

Site information
- Type: Royal Air Force station
- Owner: Ministry of Defence
- Operator: Royal Air Force

Location
- Shown within Anglesey RAF Holyhead (the United Kingdom)
- Coordinates: 53°19′04″N 004°38′49″W

Site history
- Built: 1939
- In use: 1939-1986
- Battles/wars: Second World War; Cold War

Royal Air Force Holyhead or more simply RAF Holyhead is a former Royal Air Force station situated at Holyhead, Anglesey, Wales. The former headquarters building was Porth-y-felin House, a Grade II listed building that was sold by the Ministry of Defence in the 1990s.

== Units ==
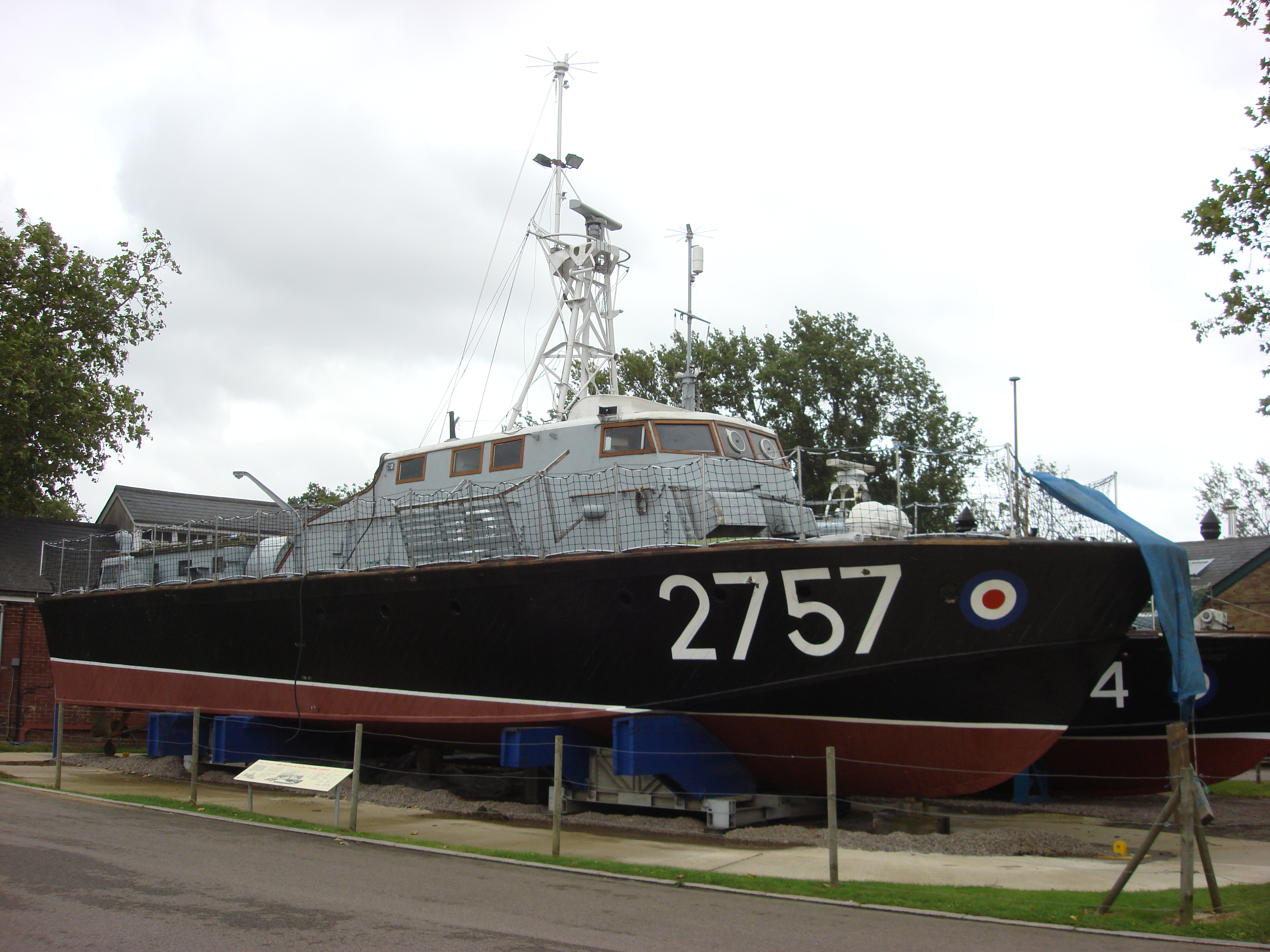
A Vosper Thornycroft 68ft Rescue & Target Towing Launch which was a type used by the 1113 MCU at Holyhead

No. 52 Air/Sea Rescue Marine Craft Unit was formed at Holyhead on 28 March 1942 and was based until disbanded in May 1942.

No. 1113 Marine Craft Unit RAF which was formed at Holyhead on 1 July 1954 and was based until it was disbanded on 1 April 1986.

== See also ==
- Anglesey Airport
- RAF Valley
- RAF Mona
