= York Hospital =

NHS hospital in York, England

- York and Scarborough Teaching Hospitals NHS Foundation Trust
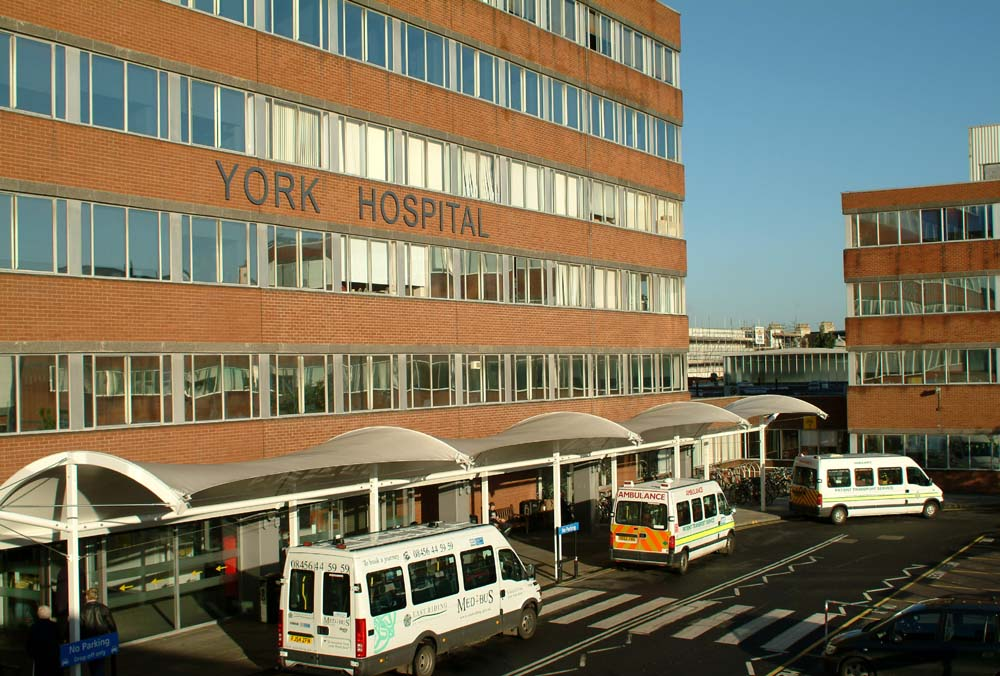
- York Hospital

Geography
- Location: Wigginton Road, York, North Yorkshire, England
- Coordinates: 53.9705°N 1.0835°W

Organisation
- Care system: NHS
- Type: Teaching, District General
- Affiliated university: Hull York Medical School University of York

Services
- Emergency department: Yes
- Beds: 700+

History
- Opened: 1976

Links
- Website: www.yorkhospitals.nhs.uk/our-hospitals/york-hospital/
- Lists: Hospitals in England

York Hospital is a teaching hospital in York, England. It is managed by York and Scarborough Teaching Hospitals NHS Foundation Trust, an NHS Foundation Trust which also runs several other hospitals in North Yorkshire and the East Riding of Yorkshire, including Scarborough Hospital, Bridlington Hospital and Malton Community Hospital.

== History ==
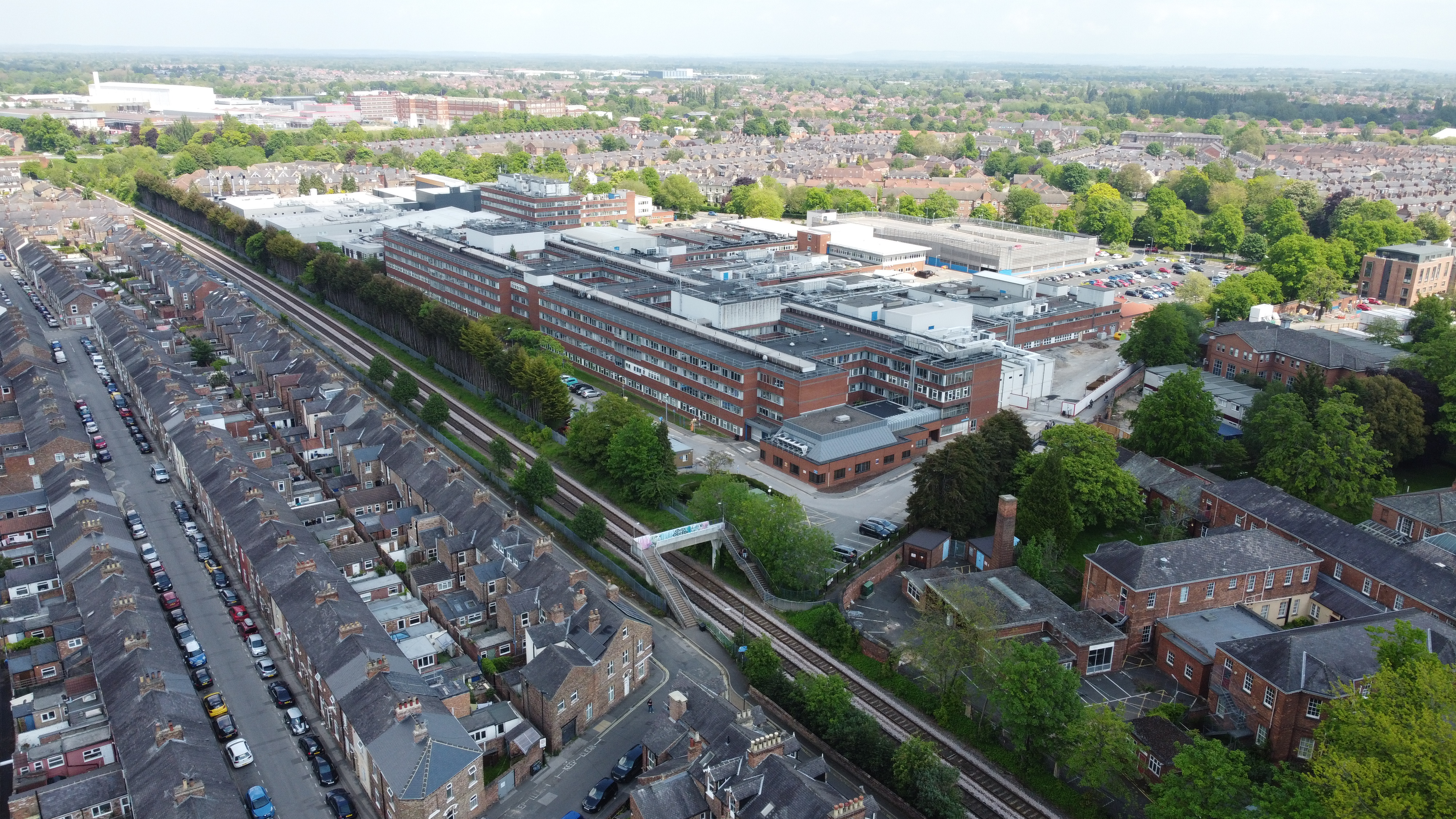
The hospital site

The present facility on Wigginton Road, which replaced numerous other facilities, including Acomb Hospital, Deighton Grove Hospital, Fulford Hospital, the Military Hospital, Yearsley Bridge Hospital, York City Hospital and York County Hospital, was designed by Llewelyn-Davies, Weeks, Forestier-Walker and Bor and built and equipped at a cost of £12.5 million between 1971 and 1976. It was officially opened by Princess Alexandra on 28 July 1977.

== Services ==
There is an Accident and Emergency department at York Hospital which is open every day. The hospital provides acute medical and surgical services for York and the surrounding areas. It has over 700 beds.

York Hospital was rated as Requires Improvement by the Care Quality Commission in March 2023.

== See also ==
- List of hospitals in England
