= Listed buildings in Bridlington =

Bridlington is a civil parish in the county of the East Riding of Yorkshire, England. It contains about 190 listed buildings that are recorded in the National Heritage List for England. These can be found in:

- Listed buildings in Bridlington (Old Town area)
- Listed buildings in Bridlington (Quay area)
- Listed buildings in Bridlington (Sewerby and Marton)
