= Helene Palmer =

English actress (1928–2011)

- Born: Helene Mapplebeck; 5 March 1928; Bolton-on-Dearne, West Riding of Yorkshire, England
- Died: 5 January 2011 (aged 82); Scarborough, North Yorkshire, England
- Occupation: Television actress
- Spouse: Alex Palmer (m. 1948)
- Children: 1

Helene Palmer (née Mapplebeck; 5 March 1928 – 5 January 2011) was an English actress best known for her portrayal of Ida Clough, a factory machinist, in the long-running soap opera Coronation Street. She appeared in the show on and off between 1978 and 1998.

== Entertainment career ==
She began her career as an entertainer in British nightclubs during the 1960s and 1970s. She collaborated and became friends with many well-known English actors and comedians in the clubs, including Lynne Perrie, Pat Phoenix, Liz Dawn, Freddie Starr and Les Dawson.

=== Acting credits ===
Palmer joined the cast of Coronation Street in 1978, portraying machinist Ida Clough. Her son, David Palmer, told the Bridlington Free Press in 2011 that he was unsure how she came to be cast in the show, but she joined the series about the same time as Lynne Perrie and others whom she worked with in the clubs. Palmer's character appeared opposite other high-profile characters on the show, including Ivy Tilsley and Vera Duckworth. Palmer remained a regular cast member on the show until 1988, when Ida Clough was fired by Mike Baldwin (portrayed by Johnny Briggs) for reporting him for drunk driving. Palmer's Ida Clough returned to the show in 1995 for the funeral of Ivy Tilsley, played by Lynne Perrie. Palmer made her last appearance on Cononation Street in 1998. Her other credits included Days of Hope, Spend, Spend, Spend and the 1979 film, Yanks. Her last appearance as an actor was in the comedic series, Stan The Man, in which she played the wife of actor Eric Sykes' character.

== Personal life ==
Palmer and her husband, Alex Palmer, were both originally from Bolton upon Dearne in the West Riding of Yorkshire. The couple, who worked in the licensed trade in addition to her career as an entertainer, purchased a home in the East Riding village of Sewerby in the 1970s with the intent to move there during their retirement. In 1986, they moved to the nearby seaside resort of Bridlington, where they began operating the Nag's Head pub in Market Place. They ran and lived at the Nag's Head until Alex retired in 1990, at which time they moved to Sewerby.

== Death ==
Palmer died on 5 January 2011, at Scarborough General Hospital in Scarborough, North Yorkshire, England at the age of 82 after a brief illness. She was survived by her husband, Alex, and her son, David Palmer. Her funeral was held on 18 January at St John the Evangelist Church in Sewerby.

Her son David died by suicide in 2018. At the time of his death he was being investigated by police over the murder of his partner.
