= Floral Pavilion =

Floral Pavilion is the name of:

- Floral Pavilion Theatre in New Brighton, England
- Old Floral Pavilion in Bridlington, England
