= St Magnus' Church, Bessingby =

Church in Bessingby, East Riding of Yorkshire, England

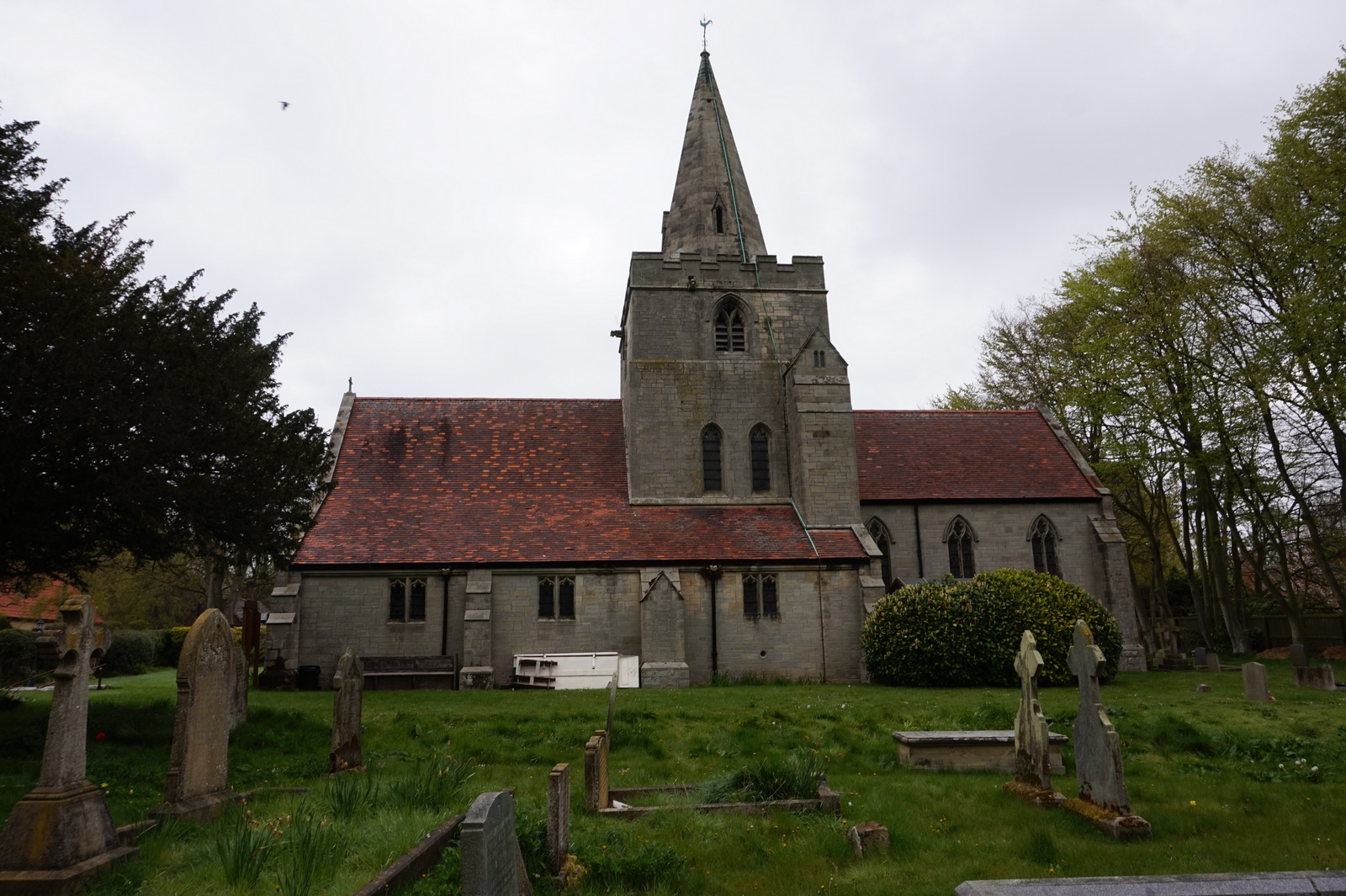
The church, in 2019

St Magnus' Church is the parish church of Bessingby, a village in the East Riding of Yorkshire, in England.

There was a church in Bessingby in the mediaeval period, but it fell into ruin, and the villagers instead worshipped at St John the Baptist's Church, Carnaby. In 1767, a small brick church was constructed in Bessingby. This was demolished and a replacement built between 1893 and 1894. It was designed by Temple Moore in a 14th-century Gothic revival style, at a cost of £2,896. The building was grade II* listed in 1976.

The church is built of Whitby stone with red tile roofs. It consists of a nave, north and south aisles, a chancel, a northeast vestry, and a central steeple. The steeple has a tower with a projecting southeast stair turret, cusped lancet windows, cusped bell openings containing Y-tracery, an embattled parapet, and a recessed spire with small spire lights. Inside, the walls are of pink stone with cream stone above. The original choir stalls, altar rails, pulpit and chancel screen survive. There is a 12th-century tub font possibly brought from Bridlington Priory, and covered in Romanesque carvings. The windows have stained glass designed by Victor Milner, and there are some 19th-century wall monuments, moved from the predecessor church.

== See also ==
- Grade II* listed buildings in the East Riding of Yorkshire
- Listed buildings in Bridlington (Quay area)
