= Brunswick Hotel =

Brunswick Hotel may refer to:

- Brunswick Hotel, Bridlington, a listed hotel in East Riding of Yorkshire, England
- Brunswick Hotel, Holbrook, a former hotel in Arizona, United States
- Brunswick Hotel, Manchester, a listed public house in Greater Manchester, England
