= St John's Church, Sewerby =

Church in Sewerby, East Riding of Yorkshire, England

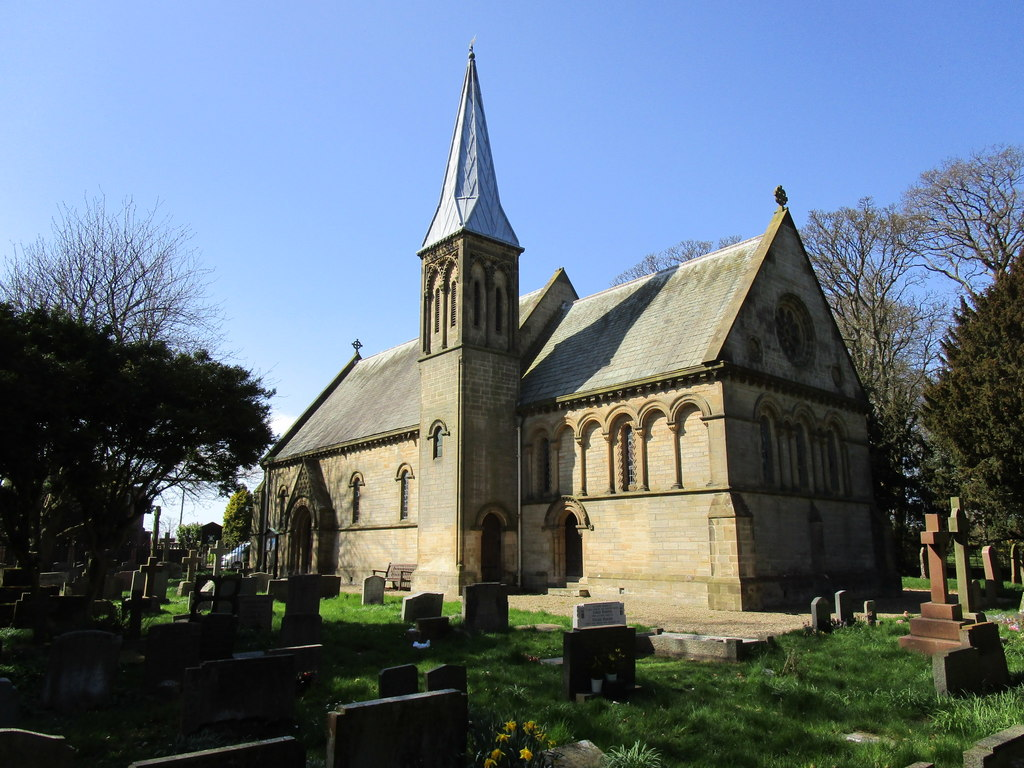
The church, in 2018

St John's Church is the parish church of Sewerby, a village in the East Riding of Yorkshire, in England.

Sewerby was long in the parish of Bridlington Priory. Between 1846 and 1848, a church was built in the village, to the designs of George Gilbert Scott. The church was funded by Yarburgh Graeme, who selected a Romanesque Revival style. This was not Scott's preference, and he later wrote that "difficulties arose from the fads of my employer". The church was restored in 1947 by Francis Johnson, his work including whitening most of the internal walls and picking out selected architectural features with colour, and putting plain glass in the nave windows. The building was grade II* listed in 1976.

The church is built of sandstone with slate roofs, and consists of a nave, a north transept, a chancel, a northeast vestry, and a steeple at the southeast corner of the nave. The steeple has a slender tower with engaged shafts, two-light bell openings in arcades, and a splay-footed lead-covered spire. The openings in the church have round-arched heads, and at the west end is a large window with three orders flanked by three-arched arcades. The south doorway is in a gabled projection, and has three orders, and three shafts in the jambs with reeded and foliage capitals. Inside, most of the original fittings survive, including pews with panelled doors. The west window has stained glass designed by William Wailes, and there is a wall monument dating from 1779, which was moved from St Martin's Church, Wharram Percy.

== See also ==
- Grade II* listed buildings in the East Riding of Yorkshire
- Listed buildings in Bridlington (Sewerby and Marton)
