= James Hudson (diplomat) =

British diplomat (1810–1885)

Sir James Hudson GCB
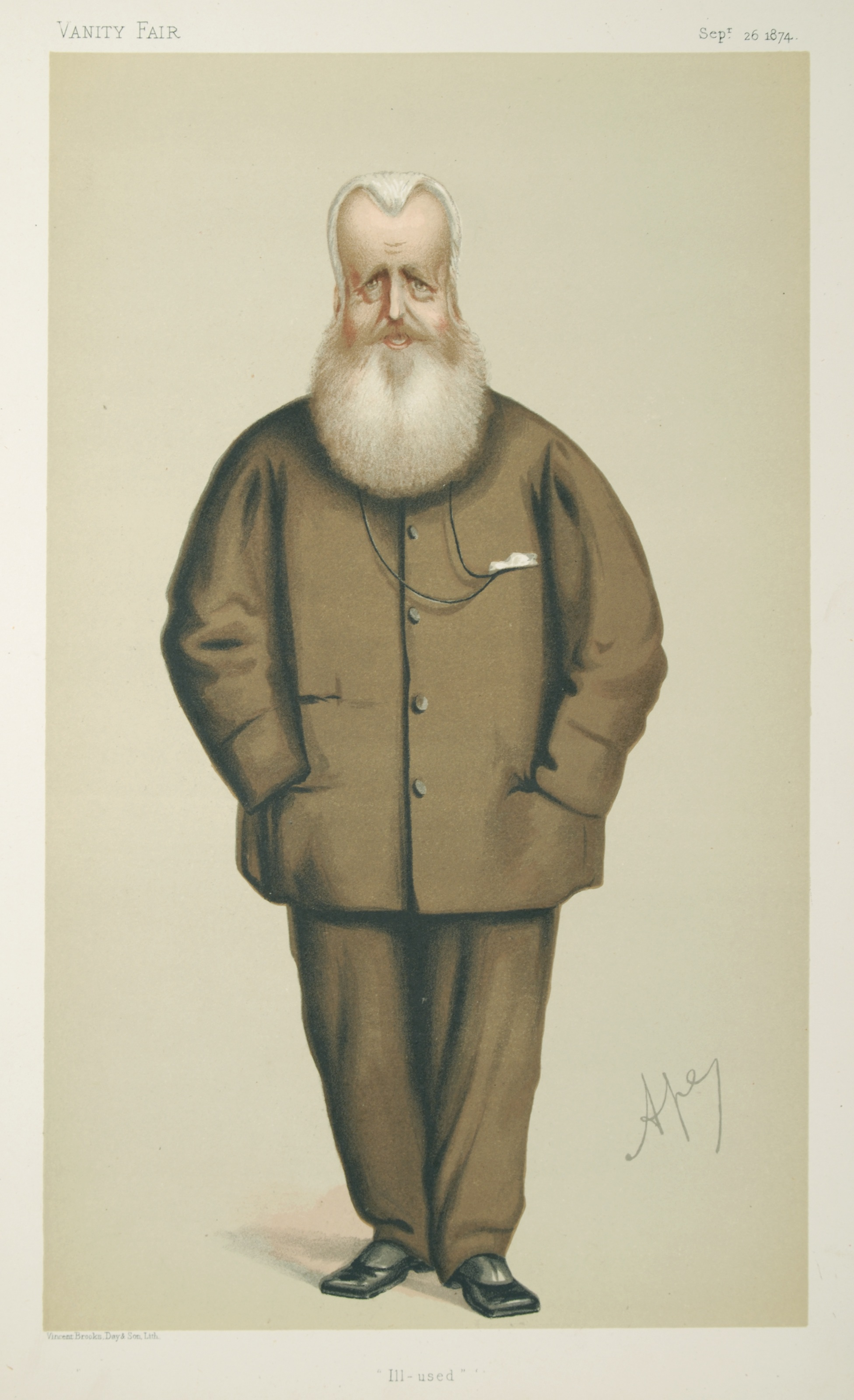
- Vanity Fair caricature of 1874
- Born: 1810; Bessingby, East Riding of Yorkshire, England
- Died: 26 September 1885 (aged 76); Strasbourg
- Occupation: Diplomat
- Known for: Ambassador to Turin

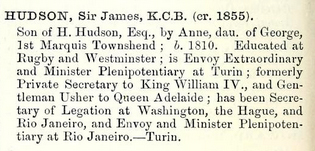
Sir James Hudson GCB biographical note in The county families of the United Kingdom; or, Royal manual of the titled and untitled aristocracy of Great Britain and Ireland, 1860

Sir James Hudson GCB (1810 – 20 September 1885) was a British diplomat. He is noted for his time as British ambassador to Turin between 1852 and 1863, as an italophile and strong supporter of Italian unification (as last British Envoy extraordinary and Minister Plenipotenziary to the Kingdom of Sardinia and first to the Kingdom of Italy after King of Sardinia Victor Emmanuel II became King of Italy), and a collector of Italian art.

== Early life ==
Hudson was born at Bessingby in the East Riding of Yorkshire, England, the eighth son of Harrington Hudson of Bessingby Hall, and his wife Lady Anne Townshend, daughter of George, 1st Marquess Townshend. He was educated at Rugby School (1823–1825) and at Westminster School (1825–1826). For three years during his youth he was sent to Italy, where he returned as part of European travel in the late 1820s.

== Court and diplomatic service ==
Hudson first entered court as a page to George III. In 1830 he became clerk to the Lord Chamberlain and, between 1831 and 1837, usher to Queen Adelaide, consort of William IV. Between 1830 and 1837 he was secretary to Sir Herbert Taylor, the private secretary to William IV. At the accession of Victoria, he, with other officials from the court of William IV, left Windsor Castle.

Foreign Secretary Lord Palmerston appointed Hudson as secretary to successive British Legations: Washington (1838), The Hague (1845), and to Rio de Janeiro, where, in 1850, he became Envoy Extraordinary and Minister Plenipotentiary. He was posted to the Grand Duchy of Tuscany, and in 1852, to Turin.

== Italy ==
Hudson returned to Italy when appointed by the 1852–55 UK coalition government to the British Legation at Piedmont, specifically to promote representative democracy. He developed a close relationship with Camillo Cavour, Prime Minister of Piedmont-Sardinia, later the first Prime Minister of a united Italy, and other leading Italian liberals, Giuseppe Massari, Marco Minghetti, Bettino Ricasoli, Giovanni Morelli and Verdi, which caused Lord Malmesbury, Foreign Minister of the 1858–59 Tory administration, to describe Hudson as "more Italian than the Italians themselves", and Victoria to express her displeasure at his closeness to the Italian liberal cause. Hudson's intimate association with Italian patriots was seen as too partisan for a man in his position, however, Malmesbury understood Hudson's reluctance to act in a way that could prevent a war (between France and Austria) that could lead to unification According to Lord Cowley, British Ambassador in Paris, Cavour went further, believing Hudson to be a greater revolutionary than any Italian, had encouraged the Sardinian Government to action, and whose home was the rendezvous for disaffected liberals. The Times commented that although he had acted in accordance with the desires of English people, he had disregarded directions from two successive governments.

Hudson was a collector of Italian art. His interest in painting fostered friendships with Massimo d'Azeglio, Prime Minister of Piedmont, and Giovanni Morelli, who were entertained at the British Legation. Hudson's mutual friends, art historian and diplomat Austen Layard and Florence-based English artist William Blundell Spence were visitors, and all could have been longstanding friends, Layard and Spence being at school together in Florence during Hudson's visit in 1829. First mention of Hudson's collection at the Legation was in 1856 by a National Gallery agent, who noted the Portrait of a Young Knight by Moretto da Brescia, seen again during a viewing of all Legation paintings by Sir Charles Eastlake, director of the National Gallery; The Moretto was acquired for the Gallery in 1857. The same year, a description of the Legation was given by the wife of the secretary to the Prussian Minister at Turin who had heard of the richness of Hudson's home; she compared it favourably to other Turin legations, mentioning "beautiful things" and Hudson's devotion to paintings. At the end of his tenure Hudson sold the Legation artworks, but gave a Titian copy, ascribed to Poussin, to Verdi and a Jacopo de' Barbari to Layard.

== Later life ==
In 1863 he was offered the ambassadorial post at Constantinople by the then Foreign Secretary, Lord John Russell; this he refused, not wanting to leave Italy. He chose retirement, which was spent mainly in Italy where he undertook various business interests, including railway projects, and became a director of the Anglo-Italian Bank, and a director of the Italian Lands & Public Works development company, which financed Milan's Galleria Vittorio Emanuele II and other public works in Florence. In 1864 he moved from Turin to a villa in the Tuscan hills near Pistoia, to be near what would be the new Italian capital of Florence, and stayed here until his death. He died on 20 September 1885 at Strasbourg, after travelling there for an operation, and is buried in Florence. During his diplomatic career he was awarded a CB (1851), a KCB (1855) and a GCB (1863).
