= York and Scarborough Teaching Hospitals NHS Foundation Trust =

NHS hospital trust

York and Scarborough Teaching Hospitals NHS Foundation Trust provides services for a population of around 800,000 people living in and around York, North Yorkshire, North East Yorkshire and Ryedale, United Kingdom.

== Facilities ==
The trust runs:

- York Hospital
- Scarborough Hospital
- Bridlington Hospital
- Malton Community Hospital
- The New Selby War Memorial Hospital
- Nelsons Court Inpatient Unit
- St Monica's Easingwold
- White Cross Court Rehabilitation Hospital

== History ==
The York Hospital NHS Foundation Trust was established on 1 April 2007, and renamed York Teaching Hospital NHS Foundation Trust in 2010, following its links with Hull York Medical School (HYMS).

In October 2010, Scarborough and North East Yorkshire NHS Trust approached the trust, seeking assistance due to their financial misfortunes. On 1 July 2012 this deal was complete and Scarborough General Hospital became part of the York trust. With many departments merging between hospitals. This new larger organisation employs over 8,500 people.

From April 2011, with community-based services moving away from the primary care trust, the trust took over the management of some of the community nursing and specialist services in Selby, York, Scarborough, Whitby and Ryedale.

In 2021 Rachael Maskell and Keep York Urgent Care Public, a staff group, denounced plans by the trust to outsource initial assessment, streaming and minor injury care in the A&E department to Vocare as privatisation.

On 1 April 2021 the trust changed its name to York and Scarborough Teaching Hospitals NHS Foundation Trust. The name was chosen to better reflect the geographical area covered by the trust and to be more inclusive of all staff.

== Performance ==
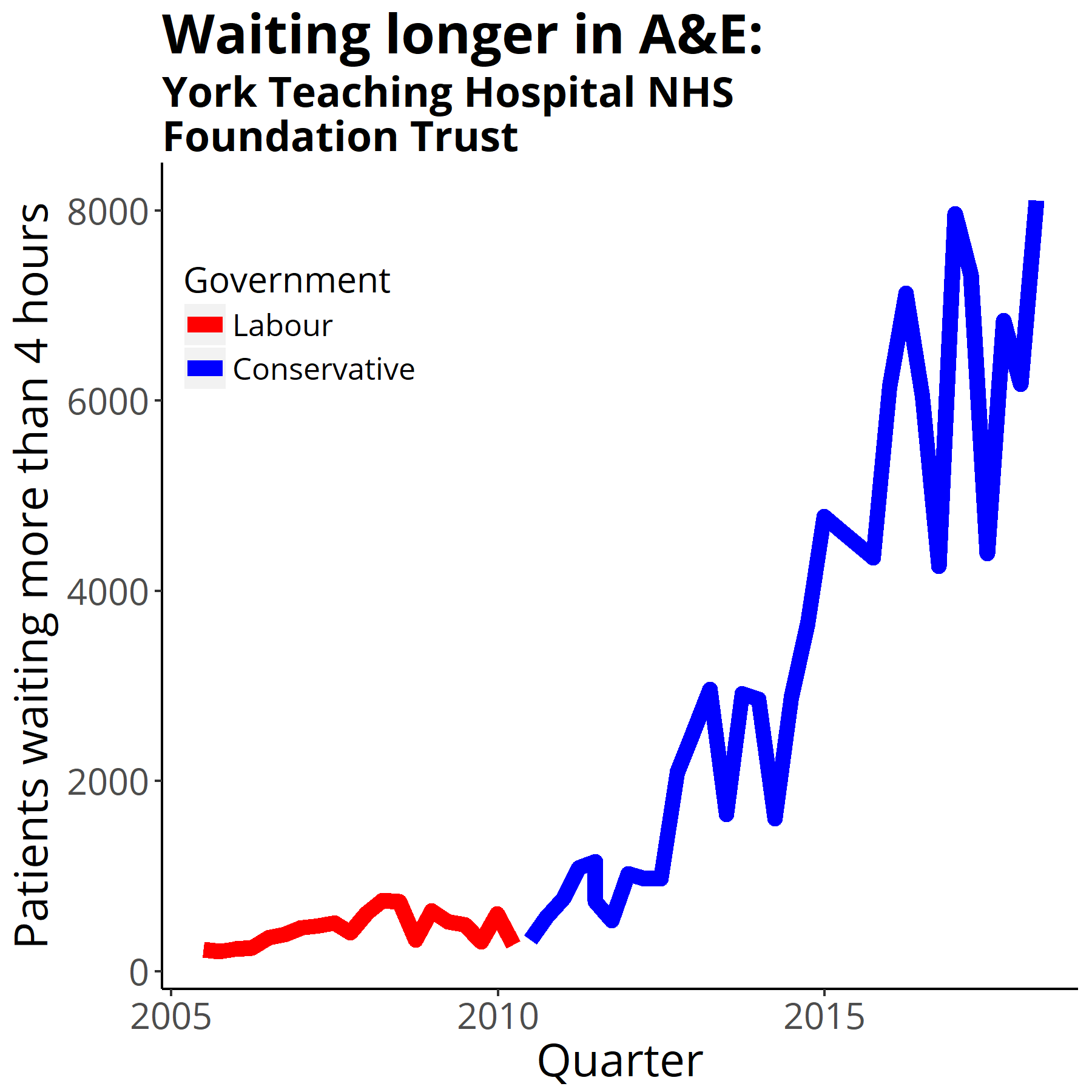
Four-hour target in the emergency department quarterly figures from NHS England Data from https://www.england.nhs.uk/statistics/statistical-work-areas/ae-waiting-times-and-activity/

During 2010/11 the annual turnover for the hospital was £247m. More than 92% of the trust's clinical income came from contracts with the Primary Care Trust.

The trust was one of 26 responsible for half of the national growth in patients waiting more than four hours in accident and emergency over the 2014/15 winter.

The trust broke from the national pay agreement in August 2015 by giving a 1% pay rise to its senior non-clinical staff - those earning above £57,069 - in line with the award for the rest of the staff. It spent £11.8m on agency staff in 2014/15.

In January 2016 the trust announced that it was expecting an unprecedented deficit of £11m on an annual budget of about £450m. All spending was to be deferred until April if possible.

In a survey of 242 hospitals in England it had the slowest responding telephone switchboard, with an average response time of 278 seconds.

In October 2017 it reported a £17.6m deficit and was reported to be "on the verge" of financial special measures as it expected to be unable to pay its bills by November 2017.

In 2022 the Care Quality Commission found there were “significant safety concerns about fundamental standards of patient care” at York hospital because “The service didn’t have enough nursing staff with the right skills, training and experience to keep patients safe and to provide the right care and treatment”.
