= Holy Trinity Church, Bridlington =

Church in Bridlington, East Riding of Yorkshire, England

Holy Trinity Church
- Church of the Holy Trinity, Bridlington
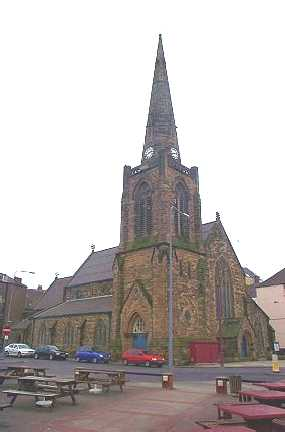
- Exterior of Holy Trinity Church
- 54.08679°N 0.18481°W
- OS grid reference: TA 18827 67174
- Address: Promenade, Bridlington, East Riding of Yorkshire, YO15 2PJ
- Country: England
- Denomination: Church of England
- Website: www.achurchnearyou.com/church/19079/

History
- Status: Grade II listed building
- Founded: 1870
- Founder: Rev. Y. G. Lloyd-Graeme
- Dedication: Holy Trinity
- Consecrated: 1871

Architecture
- Architect(s): Frederick Stead Brodrick and R. G. Smith
- Architectural type: Parish church
- Style: Gothic Revival (Early English / Late 13th-century)
- Years built: 1870–1871
- Groundbreaking: 1870
- Completed: 1871
- Construction cost: £7,000

Specifications
- Capacity: 900
- Materials: Busca Gill rock-faced stone with Whitby stone dressings

Administration
- Diocese: Diocese of York
- Parish: Bridlington

Holy Trinity Church is a Grade II listed Church of England parish church located on the Promenade in Bridlington, East Riding of Yorkshire, England. Built between 1870 and 1871 in the Early English Gothic Revival style, the building historically served an independent parish before becoming part of the Christ Church Bridlington Network.

== History ==
=== Background and construction ===
By the mid-19th century, the expansion of Bridlington Quay as a commercial port and seaside resort increased demand for local church seating, particularly unrented free seats for lower-income residents, mariners, and visitors.

The foundation stone was laid in March 1870. Construction was funded by public subscription, supported by the Reverend Yarburgh George Lloyd-Graeme (1814–1890) of Sewerby House. Lloyd-Graeme, who also funded the nearby Lloyd Hospital, contributed toward the £7,000 construction cost and donated a peal of three bells.

The church was consecrated on 15 August 1871, providing seating for 900 people. On 20 January 1874, an Order in Council formally established Holy Trinity as an ecclesiastical parish, formed from parts of Bridlington, Christ Church, and Sewerby.

=== Maritime connections ===
The period of construction coincided with the Great Gale of 10 February 1871, a severe storm off Bridlington Bay that resulted in the loss of over 70 mariners and six local lifeboatmen. Following its completion, the church's spire served as a landmark for vessel navigation into Bridlington Harbour.

=== Listing ===
The building was listed Grade II on 9 January 1976.

== Architecture and fittings ==
=== Exterior and layout ===
The church was designed by architects Frederick Stead Brodrick (1847–1927), nephew of Cuthbert Brodrick, and Richard George Smith (fl. 1870–1882), surveyor to Hull Council.

Constructed from rock-faced Busca Gill stone with Whitby stone dressings, the plan comprises a four-bay nave with lean-to aisles, a clerestory with geometrical quatrefoils, a chancel, a west porch, a north vestry, and a two-stage northwest tower with a ribbed, recessed spire.

=== Interior and stained glass ===
The nave arcades feature octagonal stone piers beneath a plastered interior. The original Victorian pews include square-headed ends and integral iron umbrella stands. Heating was originally supplied by cast-iron floor radiators manufactured by Wright Brothers of Sheffield.

Stained glass includes two windows by Hardman & Co. and three chancel windows installed between 1917 and 1921 by Herbert William Bryans.

=== Pipe organ ===
A three-manual pipe organ is situated on the north side of the chancel. It was restored in 1949 by the John Compton Organ Co.

In 1968, the organ was rebuilt by Laycock & Bannister of Keighley. The rebuild was dedicated to Wing Commander O. W. Clapp, who served as churchwarden from 1956 to 1976.

== 2024 Parish restructuring ==
In August 2024, the Diocese of York reorganized the parish boundaries in Bridlington. The independent parish of Holy Trinity was dissolved, with the church building incorporated into the Christ Church Bridlington Network, while portions of the former parish area were transferred to Bridlington Priory.

Holy Trinity continues as a worship venue within the Christ Church network.

== See also ==
- Listed buildings in Bridlington (Quay area)
