= Roxy Amusements & Cafe =

Building in Bridlington, East Riding of Yorkshire, England

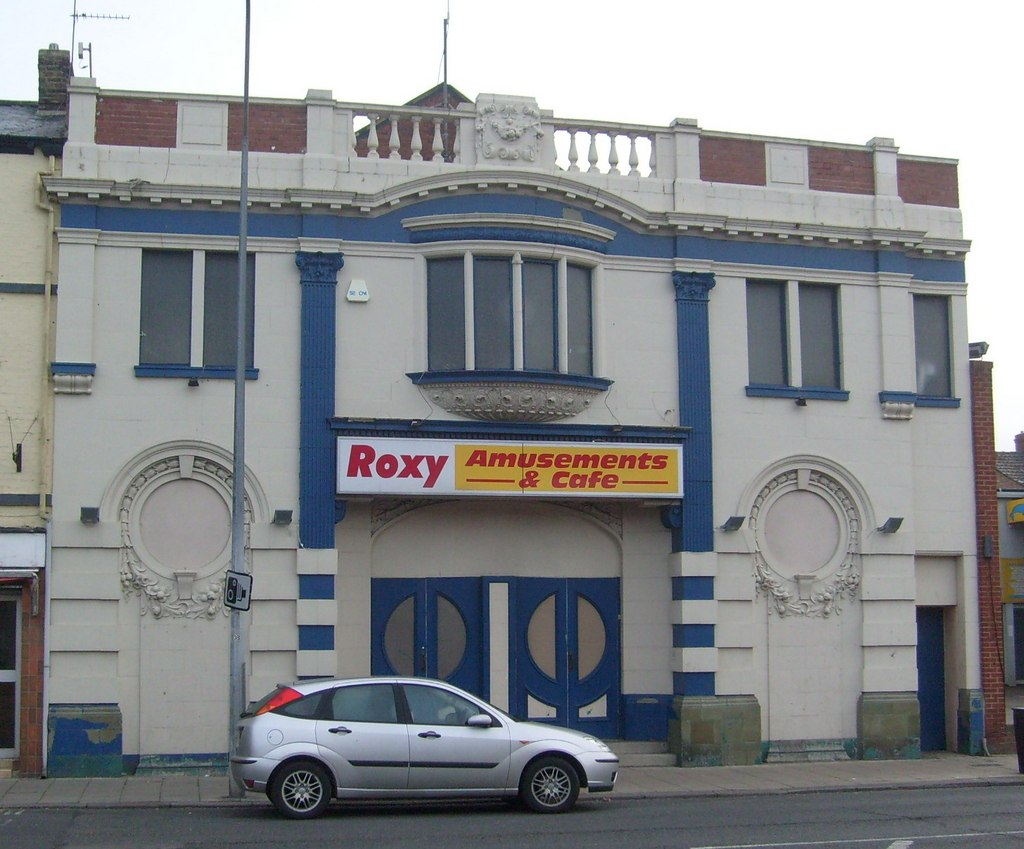
- The building in 2010

- Location within East Riding of Yorkshire
- Former names: Picture House; Picturedrome; Adelphi Picture Theatre; The Roxy

General information
- Location: Quay Road, Bridlington, East Riding of Yorkshire, England
- Year built: 1912

Listed Building – Grade II
- Official name: Former Picture House Cinema
- Designated: 19 December 2018
- Reference no.: 1452343

Roxy Amusements & Cafe (officially listed as the Former Picture House Cinema) is a historic building on Quay Road in Bridlington, a town in the East Riding of Yorkshire, England.

A temperance hall was built on Quay Road in Bridlington in 1854. In 1912, it was redeveloped as a cinema and music hall, perhaps including part of the original building. This was originally named the "Picture House", but it became the "Picturedrome" in 1913, and the "Adelphi Picture Theatre" in 1924. This latest name change was probably accompanied by a new facade. Sound equipment was installed in 1930, by British Eastern Electric. In 1933, the capacity was increased to 497. It closed in 1941 and was used for storage until 1950, when it reopened as "The Roxy". In 1961, it was converted into a bingo hall, although initially films were still occasionally shown. It was later converted into an amusement arcade, a false ceiling being inserted in the auditorium. On 19 December 2018, the former Picture House Cinema was designated a Grade II listed building.

The building is constructed of red brick, with dressings in painted stone and faience, and a pantile roof with gablets. It has two storeys and is three bays wide. The central entrance is flanked by fluted Corinthian pilasters, above which is a bow window with a decorated foliate faience plinth, and a canopy with a pulvinated frieze. The outer bays contain recessed panels above which are blocked circular window recesses enclosed by swags, and over these are two-light windows. At the top is a parapet with panels and a central balustrade containing a garlanded motif. Inside, glazed double doors lead to a rectangular entrance foyer with two staircases leading to the circle, which is used for storage. The auditorium has a proscenium arch but other original features have been removed.

== See also ==
- Listed buildings in Bridlington (Quay area)
