= Vocare =

Healthcare provider based in the UK

Vocare is a provider of Out-of-hours services to the NHS in England based in Newcastle upon Tyne.

The firm started in 1996 as Northern Doctors Urgent Care GP co-operative, run by family doctors in Northumberland who were then responsible for 24 hour care for their patients. In 2004 it took over Out-of-hours services in the North East. In 2008 it had a turnover of £10m and in 2017 it is anticipating that turnover will exceed £75 million. It now employs more than 1,800 people. It was converted from a community benefit society to a private company limited by shares in December 2016.

In 2014 the group had contracts to deliver GP out-of-hours, NHS 111 services and urgent care services to more than 1.3m patients in York, Scarborough and Ryedale, Somerset and East Leicestershire and Rutland. It took over the NHS 111 service in Shropshire in 2015. It was announced in 2017 that a £48m contract for Out-of-hours service GP and 111 services in Cornwall and the Isles of Scilly had been awarded to a consortium of Royal Cornwall Hospitals NHS Trust, Kernow Health Community Interest Company and Vocare.

It runs minor injury units, urgent care centres and Primary Care Centre in Sunderland. Four of them were rated as needing improvement by the Care Quality Commission in 2017. It also runs urgent care centres at St Mary’s Paddington, Royal United Hospital, Scarborough and Wolverhampton and an integrated urgent care service in South West London.

The company was the highest entry in the North East’s Top 200 list of largest companies 2016 and is the largest provider of GP out-of-hours and urgent care services in the region, having grown from a turnover of circa £10m in 2008 to around £77m in 2017.

John Harrison was the Chief Executive until the acquisition in 2017, at which point Andy Gregory became Managing Director.

It was bought by Totally plc for £11 million in November 2017.

In 2021 Rachael Maskell and Keep York Urgent Care Public, a staff group, denounced plans by York Teaching Hospital NHS Foundation Trust to outsource initial assessment, streaming and minor injury care in the A&E department in York as privatisation.
