= Sewerby Hall =

Country house in the East Riding of Yorkshire, England

Coordinates: 54.103360°N 0.160950°W

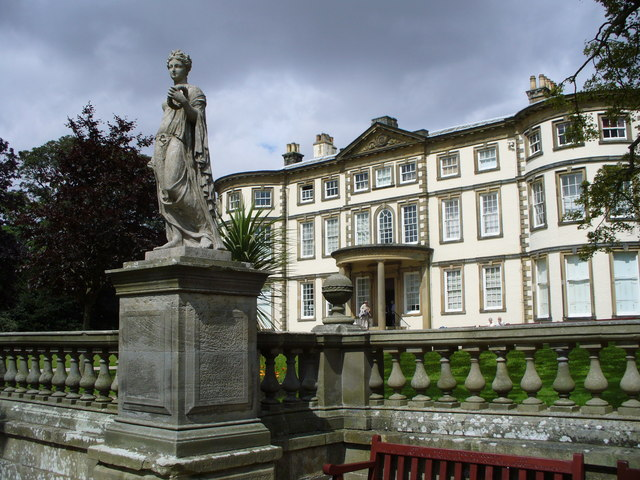
Sewerby Hall

Sewerby Hall (also known as Sewerby House) is a Grade I listed Georgian country house set in 50 acres (20 ha) of landscaped gardens in the village of Sewerby, 2 miles (3.2 km) from the seaside town of Bridlington in the East Riding of Yorkshire, England.

The main block was built c. 1714, incorporating some older work, in 3 storeys in brick with a seven window frontage. In 1808, 2-storey bow fronted wings and a semi-circular Doric portico were added and the whole building painted to resemble stone. The wings were later raised to 3 storeys.

== History ==
John Greame, son of Robert Greame, was the first of the Greame family to live at the old manor house at Sewerby. He had become quite wealthy on the death of his father in 1708 and bought the estate from Elizabeth Carleill, the last of the previous family to own the property.

He built the present Sewerby Hall between 1714–1720, replacing the manor house which had existed on the site for many years. John died in 1746 at the age of 83. His son John Greame II died childless in 1798 at the age of 98, and his widow Alicia Maria (née Spencer) stayed on at the hall until her own death in 1812. It then passed to a nephew, a third John Greame, who had married an heiress, Sarah Yarburgh of Heslington Hall, York. Sarah had died young and John Greame III had remarried and moved with his second wife to live in Sewerby Hall with his Aunt Almary.

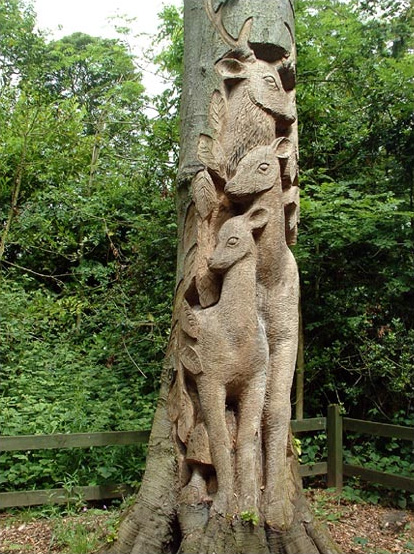
Carving at Sewerby Hall

He commissioned a number of alterations including the addition of a portico in 1808. On his death in 1841 ownership passed to his eldest son Yarburgh Greame, who also took the surname Yarburgh on inheriting his mother's estate at Heslington. Yarburgh made many improvements to the house and gardens at Sewerby, including a large conservatory called the Orangery in the mid 19th century, a clock tower in 1847, and finally a gatehouse in 1848. He also built a church and a school, designed by Sir Gilbert Scott, on the edge of the estate. He died in 1856 at the age of 70 and the estate went to his sister Alicia Maria, the wife of George Lloyd of Stockton Hall, at Stockton-on-the-Forest, York, and afterwards to their younger son, the Revd Yarburgh Gamaliel Lloyd, a Lincolnshire vicar. He changed his name to Lloyd-Greame and his son, Colonel Yarburgh George Lloyd-Greame, inherited in 1890. The Colonel's elder son, also Yarburgh Lloyd-Greame, sold the house and part of the estate to Bridlington Corporation in 1934.

In 1936, the hall and park was opened to the public with a ceremony on 1 June by aviator Amy Johnson. During the Second World War, the Royal Air Force used the house as a hospital and convalescent home for the RAF bases in the area.

In May 2012 plans for a £2.6 million restoration project moved forward with a £949,000 grant from the Heritage Lottery Fund with the work expected to take 30 months. The first phase of the project (new offices, classrooms and a shop), was started in November 2012 and was completed in August 2013. The second phase to restore the interior of the hall was started in September 2013. The restoration work was completed by August 2014.

== Architecture ==
=== House ===
The country house is in rendered brick on a plinth, with stone dressings, quoins, string courses and a slate roof. There are three storeys and seven bays, the middle three bays projecting slightly, and later full-height bowed wings. In the centre is a semicircular portico with Doric columns and a garland frieze. The windows are sashes with moulded stone architraves and keystones, the central window on the middle floor with a round-arched head.

=== Old Laundry ===
The original stable block was later converted into a laundry and then to provide amenities including toilets. It is built of brick, with rusticated stone quoins. There are two storeys and five bays, with a pediment over the middle three bays. The central doorway ha a rusticated surround and a triple keystone, and above it is a round-arched window with a rusticated head breaking through the pediment. The ground floor windows have been altered. The building is grade II* listed.

=== Stable block ===
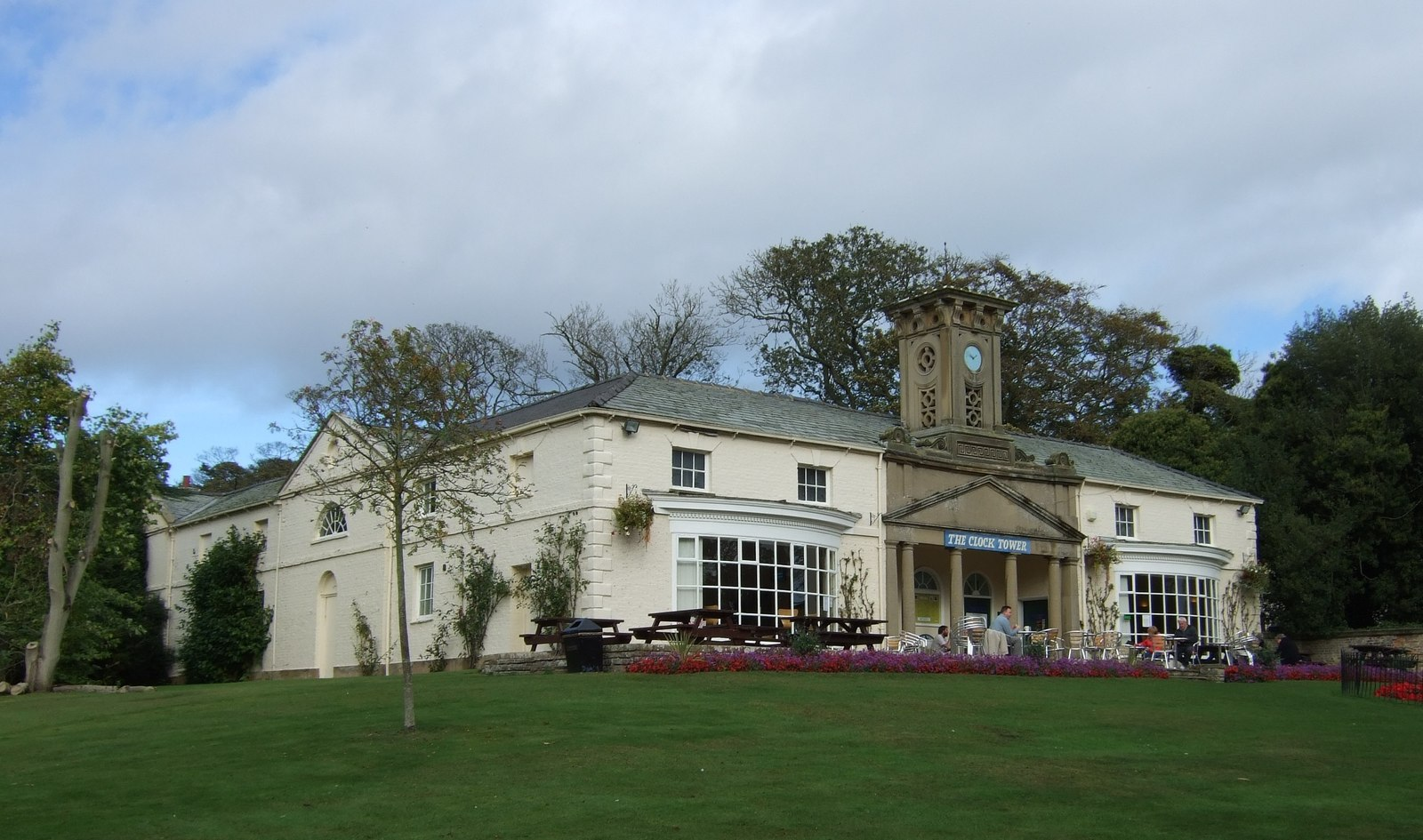
The stable block

The grade II*-listed stable block to the northwest of the house was built in 1810. It is built of painted stone, with rusticated stone quoins, a sill band, and hipped slate roofs. There are two storeys, and they form three ranges round a courtyard. The western front has five bays, the second and fourth projecting and pedimented. These bays contain a round-headed doorway, above which is a segmental-headed window, and a circular window in the tympanum, all with rusticated surrounds. The southern front has five bays and a central recessed Doric portico with a pediment. This is flanked by large bow windows, and on the roof is a cupola containing a clock face, which was added in 1847.

=== Gatehouse ===
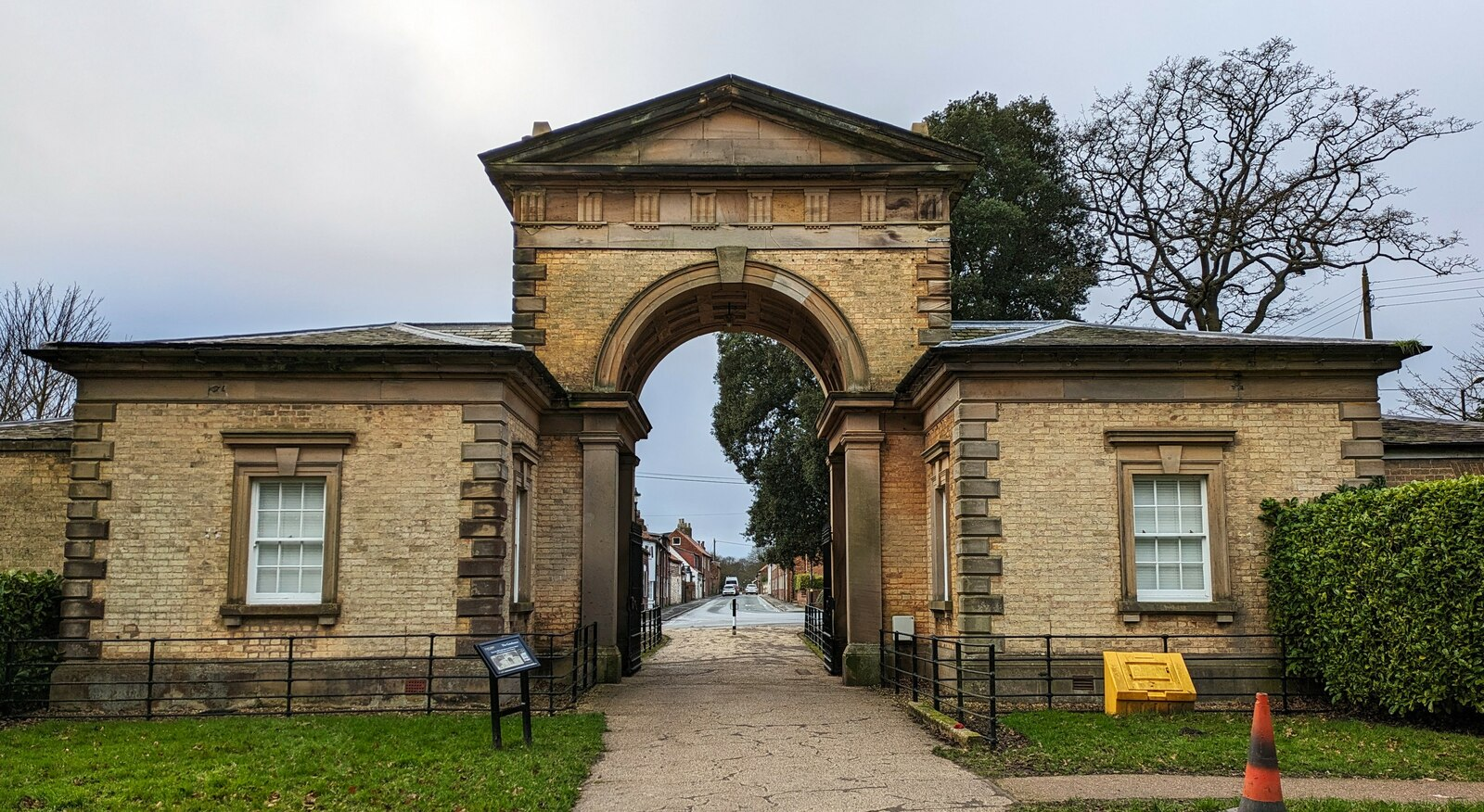
The gatehouse

The mid-19th century gatehouse at the western entrance to the grounds of the house is grade II* listed. It is built of yellow brick with stone dressings. It consists of a Doric arch with a panelled soffit, an entablature and a pediment flanked by lodges. The lodges are in yellow brick with rusticated quoins, a stone eaves cornice and a hipped roof. Each lodge has a single storey and a square plan, and it contains a doorway with a moulded surround and a cornice, and the windows have moulded surrounds and keystones. The gates are in iron, and the gateway is flanked by curving walls with stone coping on a plinth, and gate piers.

=== Conservatory ===
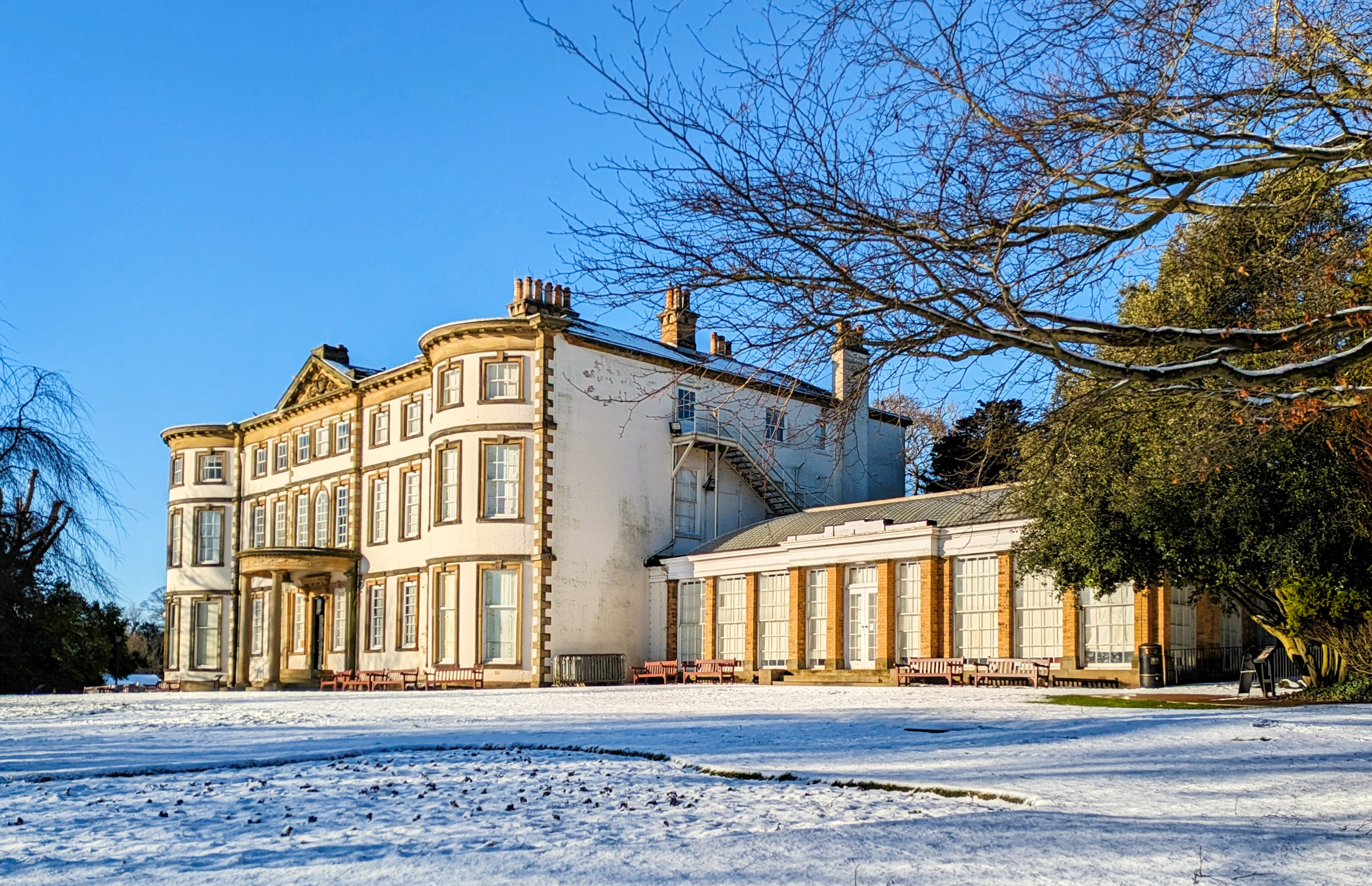
The conservatory

The conservatory to the east of the house was designed by Henry F. Lockwood and completed in 1848. It was restored by Smith and Broderck in 1889. There is a single storey, a rectangular plan, and a front of nine bays. It has a stone base, the bays are divided by yellow brick pilasters with stone capitals, and above is a cornice and a blocking course which rises in the centre. The doorway is in the centre and the windows are sashes. It is grade II* listed.

=== Courtyard archway ===
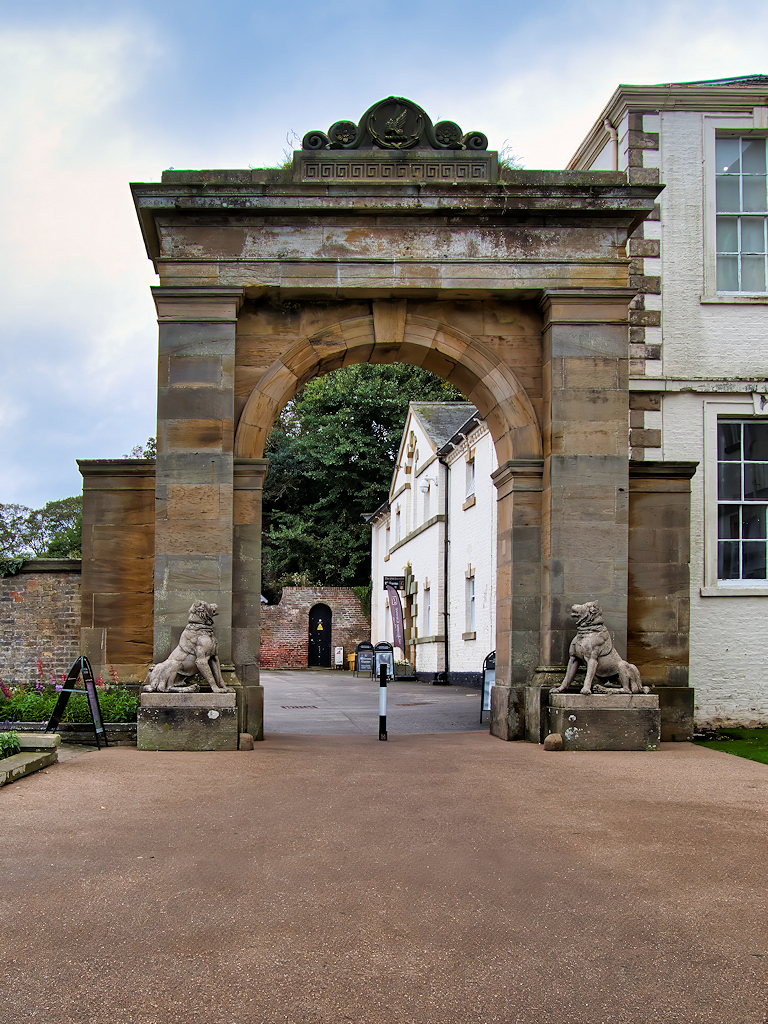
The archway

The mid-19th century archway to the northwest of the house consists of a round-headed arch with a moulded surround, Doric pilasters and an entablature with a blocking course raised in the centre and containing a Greek key over which is a heraldic emblem. On each side, in front of the arch, are statues of dogs on plinths. It is also grade II* listed.

=== Terrace balustrade, wall and archway ===
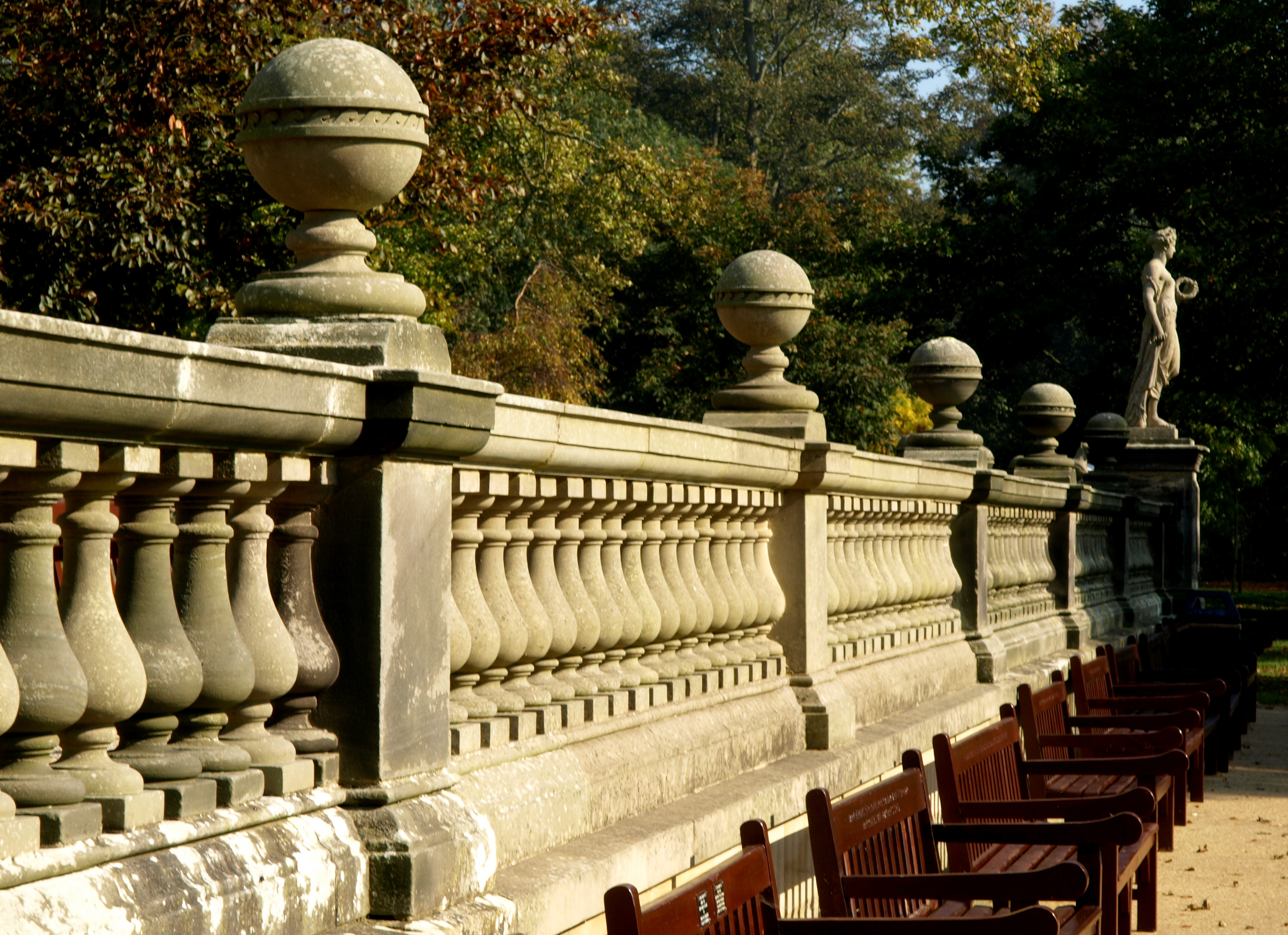
The balustrade

The balustrade on the terrace to the south of the hall, is on plinths, and carries statues of Ceres and Flora. It joins the brick garden walls that contain two elliptical archways. It was built around 1850 and is also grade II* listed.

== Attractions ==
Today, Sewerby Hall is a major tourist attraction, with over 150,000 visitors a year. The hall now houses the Museum of East Yorkshire, including a room dedicated to Amy Johnson, and the Coastguard Museum. The grounds of the hall are home to a small zoo and aviary as well as an 18-hole putting green, 9-hole pitch and putt and various gardens. As well as tourist activities, the hall also hosts many local community events. The home ground of Sewerby Cricket Club is situated within the grounds, near the cliff top.

== See also ==
- Grade I listed buildings in the East Riding of Yorkshire
- Listed buildings in Bridlington (Sewerby and Marton)
