= Lloyd Hospital =

Hospital in the East Riding of Yorkshire, England

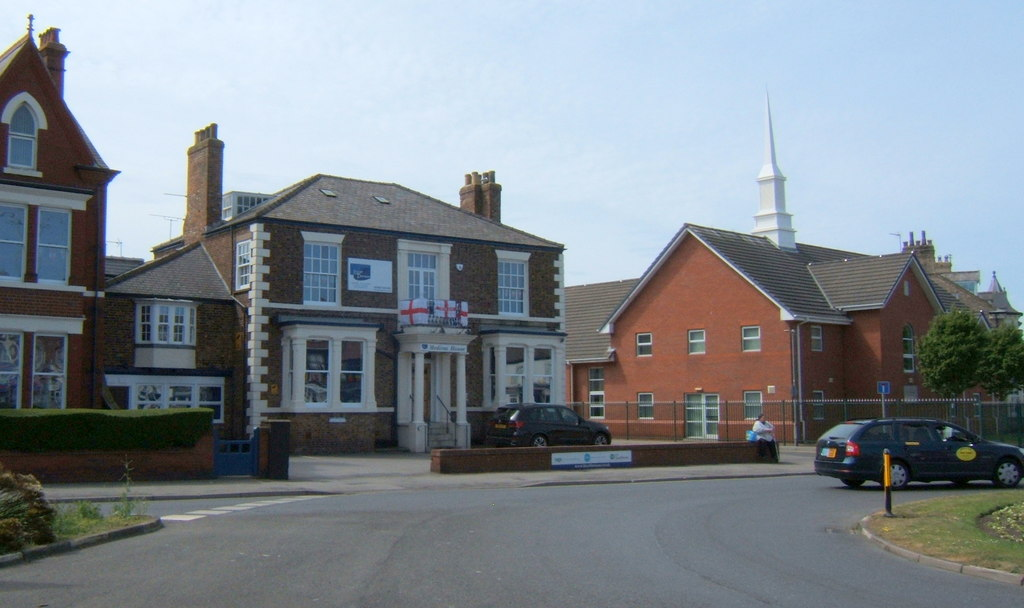
- Medina House

- Shown in East Riding of Yorkshire

Geography
- Location: Quay Road, Bridlington, East Riding of Yorkshire, England
- Coordinates: 54.0863°N 0.2020°W

Organisation
- Care system: NHS

Services
- Emergency department: No

History
- Founded: 1868
- Closed: 1988

Links
- Lists: Hospitals in England

Lloyd Hospital was a community hospital in Quay Road, Bridlington, East Riding of Yorkshire, England. The remaining structure, known as Medina House, is a Grade II listed building.

== History ==
The hospital was endowed by Miss Alicia Maria Lloyd of Stockton Hall as a memorial to her mother in 1868. It was first established in West View House in North Bridlington as "the Lloyd Cottage Hospital and Dispensary" in May 1871. In April 1876, the hospital moved to new purpose-built facilities on the north side of Medina Avenue facing Medina Cottage, an early 19th-century building which was also acquired to form part of the hospital. It joined the National Health Service in 1948. After services transferred to modern facilities at Bridlington Hospital in 1988, the Lloyd Hospital closed and was demolished in 1994. The former "Medina Cottage" was subsequently converted for commercial use as "Medina House".

== Architecture ==
The building was constructed in the early 19th century. It is built of pale brick on a plinth, with rusticated quoins, a sill band, and a hipped slate roof. There are two storeys and three bays. In the centre is a porch with columns and a moulded cornice, containing steps leading up to a doorway with a rectangular fanlight. Above it is an iron balcony, and a window with quasi-Ionic pilasters and a cornice. The outer bays of the ground floor contain two rectangular bay windows, and on the upper floor are sash windows with rusticated lintels.

== See also ==
- Listed buildings in Bridlington (Quay area)
