= Listed buildings in Bridlington (Quay area) =

Bridlington is a civil parish in the county of the East Riding of Yorkshire, England. It contains about 190 listed buildings that are recorded in the National Heritage List for England. Of these, three are listed at Grade I, the highest of the three grades, 20 are at Grade II*, the middle grade, and the others are at Grade II, the lowest grade. The parish contains the seaside town of Bridlington and the surrounding area. This list contains the listed buildings in the area described by Pevsner and Neave as the Quay area. Originally this was centred around the harbour, and during the late 18th century it became a fashionable seaside report. With the coming of the railway in 1846, the area expanded rapidly, and tourist accommodation and buildings for leisure activities grew. The listed buildings include houses, shops and offices, two piers, public houses, churches, a railway station and associated structures, a seafront pavilion, a former theatre and cinema, a war memorial and the town hall. The list also includes buildings in the village of Bessingby to the southwest of the Quay area, which contains listed houses, cottages, farmhouses and farm buildings, and a church.

== Key ==
| Grade | Criteria |
|---|---|
| II* | Particularly important buildings of more than special interest |
| II | Buildings of national importance and special interest |

== Buildings ==
| Name and location | Photograph | Date | Notes | Grade |
|---|---|---|---|---|
| Bessingby Hall Farmhouse; 54.07682°N 0.23103°W | | Early 17th century | The cottage, which was later restored and extended, is in brick, with stone quoins, and a pantile roof. The gable end facing the street is in chalk in the lower part and tumbled brickwork above. There is one storey and attics, and three bays. The porch has moulded imposts, an inscribed and dated keystone and a pediment. The windows are mullioned, with four lights, and there are two gabled roof dormers. | II |
| 9 Garden Walk; 54.08149°N 0.19104°W | — | 17th century | The house is rendered, and has a rendered and moulded eaves cornice, and a steep pantile roof. There are two storeys and an attic, and one bay. On the ground floor is a doorway with a carved rendered lintel and a keystone. To its left and on the upper floor are three-light windows, and above is a three-light sloped roof dormer. | II |
| 25 and 26 Queen Street; 54.08167°N 0.19097°W | — | 17th century | A pair of rendered shops with a pantile roof. There are two storeys and attics, and three bays. On the ground floor are two mid-to-late 19th-century shopfronts with pilasters. The upper floor contains two canted bay windows flanking a sash window, and above is a sloped roof dormer with horizontally sliding sashes. | II |
| Pigeoncote, Bessingby Hall; 54.07655°N 0.23202°W | — | 17th century (probable) | The pigeoncote is in brick, partly rebuilt in stone, and it has a steep pantile roof. There are two storeys, and between the storeys is a diagonal-set brick cornice. On the roof is a weathervane. | II |
| 21, 21A and 22 Queen Street; 54.08168°N 0.19046°W | | Late 17th or early 18th century | The building, on a corner site, is rendered, and has a pantile roof, hipped on the left. There are two storeys, three bays on the front and two on the left return. The ground floor contains shopfronts, and on the upper floor are windows of varying types, including sashes, a casement window and modern windows. | II |
| 15 Promenade; 54.08270°N 0.18929°W | — | 18th century | The shop is rendered, and has a wooden eaves cornice and a pantile roof. There are three storeys and one bay. On the ground floor is a modern shopfront, the middle floor contains a canted bay window, and on the top floor is a sash window with shutters. | II |
| 17 and 17A Promenade; 54.08275°N 0.18926°W | — | 18th century | The shop is rendered, and has a pantile roof. There are two storeys and two bays. On the ground floor is a shopfront, and to the right is a doorway with grooved pilasters and paterae, a semicircular fanlight, and an open pediment. The upper floor contains a canted bay window, and to the right is a sash window. | II |
| 45 Promenade; 54.08367°N 0.18844°W | — | 18th century | The shop is in painted brick, with a stone coped parapet, and a pantile roof with a stone coped right gable. There are three storeys and attics, and two bays. The ground floor contains a shopfront, on the upper floors of the left bay is a two-storey bow window, the right bay has sash windows, and above are two sloped roof dormers. | II |
| 112 Quay Road; 54.08615°N 0.20027°W | | 18th century | The shop is in painted brick, with a dentilled eaves cornice and a pantile roof. There are two storeys and two bays. On the left is a small shopfront with narrow pilasters, to the right is a doorway with a blocked ornamental fanlight and a tall window with a stuccoed lintel. The upper floor contains sash windows. | II |
| 4 and 5 Queen Square; 54.08148°N 0.19085°W | | 18th century | A pair of rendered houses with a tile roof. There are three storeys and three bays. The middle bay contains two round-arched doorways with narrow pilasters, panelled soffits and reveals, semicircular fanlights, a grooved frieze with paterae and a cornice, above which are two round-headed windows. The outer bays contain two-storey canted bay windows, and on the top floor are sash windows with stone lintels. On the left return is a two-storey rectangular bay window. | II |
| 9 Queen Street; 54.08189°N 0.19070°W | — | 18th century | The shop is rendered, and has rusticated quoins on the left, a modillion eaves cornice and a Welsh slate roof. There are three storeys and an attic, and two bays. The ground floor has a shopfront and a passage entry to the left, and on the middle floor is a canted bay window with a swept lead roof. The top floor contains two sash windows, and above is a gabled roof dormer. | II |
| 12 Queen Street; 54.08183°N 0.19047°W | — | 18th century | The shop is in painted brick with a pantile roof. There are two storeys and attics, and two bays, the right bay narrower. The ground floor contains a shopfront and a passage entry to the right under a segmental arch. On the upper floor is a canted bay window on the left, and a sash window with a moulded surround, and above are two sloped dormers. | II |
| 8 Wellington Road; 54.08409°N 0.19246°W | — | 18th century | The building is rendered, and has bracketed eaves and a Welsh slate roof. There are two storeys and attics, and two bays. The doorway in the right bay has pilasters, a panelled soffit and reveals, a semicircular fanlight and a cornice, and to its right is a round-arched passage entry. The windows are sashes, the ground floor windows with painted voussoirs, and on the roof are two segmental-headed dormers. | II |
| Cottage at corner of Main Street and Church Lane; 54.07675°N 0.23066°W | | Mid-18th century (probable) | The cottage is in brick, and has a pantile roof with tumbled brickwork to the gable ends. There is one storey and two bays. The doorway has a moulded surround, the windows are horizontally sliding sashes, and at the rear is a sloped dormer. | II |
| Field House; 54.08593°N 0.19336°W | — | 18th century | Two houses in brick, with hipped roofs of grey and red pantiles. The left house has a fluted Doric portico with an entablature, later filled in to form a porch, and bay windows. The right house faces the reverse way, and has a bow window containing a chalybeate spring. The entrance has a Tuscan portico, and at the rear is a two-storey bow window. | II |
| Manor Farmhouse; 54.07737°N 0.22679°W | — | 1754 | The farmhouse is in brick with a pantile roof. There are two storeys and four bays, with the gable end facing thestreet. The doorway has a rectangular fanlight, and the windows are three-light horizontally sliding sashes. On the front is an inscribed date plaque. | II |
| 10 and 12 Wellington Road; 54.08420°N 0.19240°W | — | Late 18th century | A pair of houses in brick on a rendered plinth, with stone dressings, rusticated quoins, and floor and sill bands. There are three storeys and four bays. In the central two bays are doorways with reeded pilasters, panelled soffits and jambs, a semicircular fanlight, a reeded frieze and a small cornice, and between them is a round-arched passage entry. The windows are sashes, one tripartite, with painted voussoirs. | II |
| Cottage Farmhouse; 54.07714°N 0.22947°W | — | Late 18th century (probable) | The farmhouse is in brick, with a brick eaves cornice, partly dentilled, and a pantile roof with tumbled brickwork to the gable ends. There are two storeys and six bays. On the front are two doorways with plain surrounds and rectangular fanlights, and there are three sloped dormers. | II |
| Outbuildings east of Manor Farmhouse; 54.07750°N 0.22647°W | — | Late 18th century (probable) | The farm buildings are in brick, and have a pantile roof and tumbled brickwork to the gable ends. They have one storey and contain stable doors. | II |
| 114 and 116 Quay Road; 54.08619°N 0.20038°W | | 18th or early 19th century | Two rendered shops, in brick on the side, with a dentilled eaves cornice and a pantile roof. There are two storeys and three bays. On the ground floor are two late 19th-century shopfronts, and the upper floor contains sash windows. | II |
| 24 Queen Street; 54.08162°N 0.19087°W | — | 18th or early 19th century | The shop is rendered and has a pantile roof. There are three storeys and an attic, and one bay. On the ground floor is a modern shopfront, the middle floor contains a canted bay window, the top floor has a sash window with a moulded surround, and above is a sloped roof dormer. | II |
| The Brunswick Public House; 54.08203°N 0.19198°W | | Late 18th or early 19th century | The public house is rendered, and has a slate roof with a coped gable and a kneeler on the left. There are three storeys and attics, and five bays. In the centre is a Doric porch, and the outer bays contain three-storey canted bay windows. The other windows are sashes, those on the left return with segmental heads, and there are three gabled roof dormers. At the rear is a two-storey wing, and a wing with oriel windows. | II |
| Bessingby Hall; 54.07907°N 0.23064°W | | 1807 | A country house in yellow brick, with a sill band, a moulded parapet, a cornice, and a hipped roof. There are two storeys and five bays, the middle bay slightly recessed. In the centre is a semicircular Grecian portico with a stone balustrade forming a balcony. The doorway has a narrow fanlight and narrow flanking lights. The window above the portico has three lights and a segmental head, and the other windows are sashes. | II |
| North Pier and Crane Wharf; 54.08096°N 0.18788°W | | 1816–43 | The pier was extended in 1866 by Sir John Coode. It is built in sandstone blocks, the extension has concrete blocks, the core is filled with chalk, and the middle section incorporates iron sheet piles. The pier forms the eastern side of the harbour, and extends for about 223 metres (732 ft). Crane Wharf extends for about 50 metres (160 ft) to the west, and incorporates a jetty extending into the harbour. | II |
| 2 and 4 Havelock Place; 54.08841°N 0.20137°W | | Early 19th century | A pair of houses in painted brick with a pantile roof. There are two storeys and four bays. The right doorway has attached wooden columns and a cornice, the left doorway has a plain rendered surround, and both have rectangular fanlights. The windows are sashes with painted brick voussoirs. | II |
| 10 and 12 King Street; 54.08219°N 0.19135°W | — | Early 19th century | A pair of offices in brick with a Welsh slate roof. There are two storeys and attics, and four bays. The ground floor contains shopfronts with grooved pilasters, a dentilled cornice, a continuous fascia, scroll brackets over the doorways, and rendered stall risers. On the upper floor are canted bay windows alternating with sash windows with painted voussoirs, and above are two sloped roof dormers. | II |
| 9 and 10 Manor Street; 54.0823081°N 0.19201°W | — | Early 19th century | A pair of shops in painted brick, with a roof partly of pantile, and partly of Welsh slate, and with a coped gable and kneeler on the left. There are three storeys and three bays. The ground floor contains two modern shopfronts, between which are paired doorways with rectangular fanlights, and a central panelled pilaster with a pediment. On the middle floor, each outer bay has a canted bay window, between which is a two-light window with a rendered lintel and a keystone. On the top floor are three sash windows with rendered lintels. | II |
| 6 Queen Square; 54.08153°N 0.19087°W | | Early 19th century (probable) | The house is rendered and has a Welsh slate roof. There are three storeys and two bays. The left bay has a doorway with a flat hood on brackets, above which is a two-storey canted bay window. The right bay has a bay window on the middle floor, and a sash window in an architrave above. | II |
| 13 Queen Street; 54.08181°N 0.19040°W | — | Early 19th century | The shop is rendered and has a pantile roof. There are three storeys and attics, and two bays. The ground floor contains a modern shopfront, on the middle floor is a canted bay window, the top floor has two sash windows with moulded surrounds and painted lintels, and there is a gabled roof dormer. | II |
| 15 Queen Street; 54.08177°N 0.19018°W | — | Early 19th century | The shop is in painted brick with a pantile roof. There are three storeys and attics, and two bays, the right bay narrow and recessed. On the left bay is a modern shopfront, above which is a canted bay window. The top floor has a sash window with a moulded surround and a rusticated lintel, and above is a roof dormer. The right bay has a round-arched doorway, and sash windows above. | II |
| Belle Vue Terrace; 54.08647°N 0.18747°W | | Early 19th century | A terrace of four houses in brick, with a hipped Welsh slate roof. There are three storeys and eight bays. On the right bay of each house is a round-arched doorway with a moulded surround, panelled reveals and soffit, a semicircular radiating fanlight and a keystone. The windows are sashes with rusticated lintels and grooved keystones. | II |
| Bellevue House; 54.08638°N 0.18786°W | — | Early 19th century | The house is rendered and has a hipped tile roof. There are two storeys and three bays. The doorway has pilasters, an entablature, a three-light rectangular fanlight and a cornice. The windows are sashes with rusticated lintels and keystones. | II |
| Lodge, Bessingby Hall, walls, gate piers and gates 54.08066°N 0.22757°W | | Early 19th century | The lodge at the entrance to the grounds of the hall is in yellow brick with a Welsh slate roof. There is a single storey and two bays, the left bay forming a canted bay window under a gable. The attached retaining walls are in yellow brick and panelled, the gates are in iron, and the gate piers have ball finials. | II |
| Havelock House; 54.08812°N 0.20124°W | | Early 19th century | The house is in brown brick, with a stone sill band, eaves on carved brackets, and a hipped Welsh slate roof. There are two storeys and three bays. The central doorway has attached columns, a rectangular fanlight, and a moulded cornice. The windows are sashes with painted lintels. | II |
| Former Lloyd Hospital; 54.08638°N 0.20193°W | | Early 19th century | The building, later Medina House, is in pale brick on a plinth, with rusticated quoins, a sill band, and a hipped slate roof. There are two storeys and three bays. In the centre is a porch with columns and a moulded cornice, containing steps leading up to a doorway with a rectangular fanlight. Above it is an iron balcony, and a window with quasi-Ionic pilasters and a cornice. The outer bays of the ground floor contain two rectangular bay windows, and on the upper floor are sash windows with rusticated lintels. | II |
| The George Public House; 54.08133°N 0.18834°W | — | Early 19th century | The public house is rendered, on a plinth, with rusticated quoins, a moulded eaves cornice, and a Welsh slate roof. There are three storeys and two bays. Steps lead up to the central doorway that has carved pilasters, an entablature, panelled reveals and a cornice, and to its right is a foot scraper. Flanking the doorway are two-storey canted bay windows, above it is a blank panel, and the top floor contains two sash windows. | II |
| Thorn Villa; 54.08620°N 0.18766°W | — | Early 19th century | The house is rendered, with rusticated quoins, sill bands, and a hipped Welsh slate roof. There are two storeys and three bays. In the centre is a porch with hexagonal columns, an entablature and a cornice. This is flanked by canted bay windows, and the other windows are sashes under rendered segmental arches. | II |
| 170 and 172 Quay Road; 54.08735°N 0.20197°W | | Early to mid-19th century | A pair of houses in brick, with a wide bracketed eaves cornice, and a hipped slate roof. There are two storeys and three bays. In the centre is a paired doorway with inset columns, a central pilaster, panelled reveals, rectangular fanlights, an entablature and a cornice. The windows are casements with brick voussoirs, and the window above the doorway is recessed. | II |
| Christ Church; 54.08473°N 0.19312°W | | 1840–41 | The church was designed by George Gilbert Scott and William Moffatt, alterations were made in 1851, the steeple was built in 1859, a hall was added in 1884–85, and in 1962–63 the interior was redesigned by George Pace. It is built in sandstone with slate roofs, and consists of a nave, north and south aisles, north and south transepts, a chancel and a southwest steeple. The steeple has a tower with four stages, and octagonal angle buttresses rising to turrets with octagonal pinnacles. It contains lancet windows and bell openings, and clock faces, and has a tall spire with two tiers of lucarnes. | II |
| South Pier; 54.07999°N 0.19024°W | | 1843–48 | The pier, which is built in sandstone blocks, was designed by James Walker. It forms the southern side of the harbour, and extends westward for about 460 metres (1,510 ft). On the south side is a slipway, and on the northern side is a flight of steps. The pier is widened on the harbour side to accommodate a fish market, and there is another widening halfway along the pier. | II |
| Goods Shed, Bridlington railway station 54.08468°N 0.19785°W | | 1846 | The goods shed was built for the York and North Midland Railway and designed by George T. Andrews. It is in yellow brick on a stone plinth, with stone dressings, an impost band and a Welsh slate roof. There is a single storey, and fronts of five and two bays. In the centre of the front is a former Diocletian window that has been extended, the flanking bays contain round-arched doorways, an on the outer bays are flat-headed vehicle doorways. On the reverse are three Diocletian windows and two loading doors. At the southwestern end is a projecting office. | II |
| Holy Trinity Church; 54.08675°N 0.18477°W | | 1870–71 | The church was designed by Smith and Brodrick in Early English style. It is built in Busa Gill stone with dressings in Whitby stone, and consists of a nave with a clerestory, a west porch, north and south aisles, a chancel, a north vestry and a northwest steeple. The steeple has a tower with two stages, a north doorway under a gable, tall two-light bell openings, and a recessed spire with ribs on the angles and tall spire lights. | II |
| Bridlington South signal box 54.08350°N 0.20452°W | | 1893 | The signal box was built for the North Eastern Railway. It is in red brick on a plinth, with glazing on the upper storey, and a Welsh slate roof with orange ridge tiles and timber bargeboards. There are two storeys and ten bays, and stairs in galvanised steel on the southwest. | II |
| St Magnus' Church, Bessingby; 54.07643°N 0.23010°W | | 1893–94 | The church, designed by Temple Moore, is in Whitby stone with red tile roofs. It consists of a nave, north and south aisles, a chancel, a northeast vestry, and a central steeple. The steeple has a tower with a projecting southeast stair turret, cusped lancet windows, cusped bell openings containing Y-tracery, an embattled parapet, and a recessed spire with small spire lights. | II* |
| Church of Our Lady and St Peter and presbytery 54.08638°N 0.19287°W | | 1893–94 | The church is in red brick, with stone dressings and a Welsh slate roof with terracotta cresting. It consists of a nave with aisles, and a chancel with side chapels. Flanking the entrance are buttresses rising to stone pinnacles, and between these are a stone coped gable with a cross finial. The doorway and flanking windows have pointed arches, and above them are three tall windows and two statues under canopies. On the left is a porch linking the church to the presbytery. This has two storeys and two bays, the left bay forming a wide two-storey bay window. To the right is a doorway with an elaborate pointed and crocketed hood mould. | II |
| Floral Pavilion; 54.08251°N 0.18700°W | | 1904–06 | The seafront pavilion has a cast iron frame, and is largely glazed, with a partial roof in Welsh slate added later. The pillars are decorated, and have spandrel brackets carrying an overhanging glazed roof. Between the pillars are timber and glazed screens, and on the roof are two domed ventilators. | II |
| Bridlington railway station 54.08417°N 0.19964°W | | 1912 | The railway station was built for the North Eastern Railway, and the refreshment rooms were added in 1925. It is in red brick with sandstone details, and roofs of Welsh slate, steel and glazing. The entrance front has three gabled ranges with a canopy in front of the left two ranges. The left range contains offices and has two large three-light windows. The middle range consists of the concourse and has three round-arched entrances, above which is a segmental pediment containing a clock face. The right range contains two-storey refreshment rooms. | II |
| Former Picture House Cinema; 54.08899°N 0.20314°W | | 1912 | A variety theatre and cinema built on the site of a previous temperance hall, and later used for other purposes, it is in red brick, with dressings in painted stone and faience, and a pantile roof with gablets. There are two storeys and three bays. The central entrance is flanked by fluted Corinthian pilasters, above which is a bow window with a decorated foliate faience plinth, and a canopy with a pulvinated frieze. The outer bays contain recessed panels above which are blocked circular window recesses enclosed by swags, and over these are two-light windows. At the top is a parapet with panels and a central balustrade containing a garlanded motif. | II |
| War memorial 54.08438°N 0.19272°W | | 1921 | The war memorial was designed by Ernest G Theakston and the sculpture is by Stanley Nicholson Babb. It is in limestone, and consists of a tall cenotaph on two steps. At the top are carved swags, and a bronze urn with an eternal flame. On the south front is a bronze relief of the winged Angel of Victory over two slumped soldiers. On the memorial are inscriptions, and bronze plaques containing the names of those lost in the World Wars and other conflicts. | II |
| Bridlington Town Hall; 54.08513°N 0.19949°W | | 1931 | The town hall is in red brick on a concrete plinth, with dressings in stone and concrete, quoins, a moulded entablature, a cornice and a parapet. There are two storeys and a front of 15 bays, the middle five and the end bays projecting. In the centre is a portico with four Corinthian columns carrying an open pediment containing a coat of arms, and above it is a stone cupola with a square lead dome. The doorway has a moulded surround and a flat hood forming a balcony with iron railings. The flanking wings contain sash windows with moulded surrounds and pediments. The outer bays form pavilions, with giant Corinthian pilasters and pediments. The north and south fronts have seven bays, and the rear has 15 bays, and contains a central doorway with a pediment. | II |

== See also ==
- Listed buildings in Bridlington (Old Town area)
- Listed buildings in Bridlington (Sewerby and Marton)
