= Listed buildings in Bridlington (Sewerby and Marton) =

Bridlington is a civil parish in the county of the East Riding of Yorkshire, England. It contains about 190 listed buildings that are recorded in the National Heritage List for England. Of these, three are listed at Grade I, the highest of the three grades, 20 are at Grade II*, the middle grade, and the others are at Grade II, the lowest grade. This list contains the listed buildings in the villages of Sewerby and Marton, to the northeast of the Old Town area of Bridlington. The most important building is the country house Sewerby House, which is listed together with associated structures. The other listed buildings include houses, cottages and associated structures, farm buildings, a public house, a former school, a church and a former vicarage.

== Key ==
Grade	Criteria
I	Buildings of exceptional interest, sometimes considered to be internationally important
II*	Particularly important buildings of more than special interest
II	Buildings of national importance and special interest

== Buildings ==
Name and location	Photograph	Date	Notes	Grade
17 Main Street and outbuildings 54.10148°N 0.16695°W		17th century	The house is in brick, with an eaves cornice and a pantile roof. There are two storeys and two bays. The central doorway has a painted stucco surround with pilasters and an entablature. The windows are sashes, those on the ground floor with white brick heads. To the left is a lower block with a doorway, a large window and a horizontally sliding sash window above. Further to the left is a single-storey block with a sash window, a doorway and a large small-paned window.	II
Marton Hall; 54.10906°N 0.16403°W		1672	The house, later used for other purposes, is in brick, with rusticated quoins, a moulded string course, a floor band, and a hipped slate roof. There are two storeys and attics, and five bays, the middle bay projecting slightly. In the centre is a doorway with engaged Doric columns, pilasters, an entablature, a segmental fanlight with Gothic tracery and an open pediment. The windows are sashes with moulded surrounds. On the right return is a later two-storey canted bay.	II*
4 Main Street; 54.10120°N 0.16739°W	—	17th or early 18th century	The cottage is in brick on a stone plinth, and has a pantile roof. There is one storey and three bay. The doorway has a plain surround, and the windows are horizontally sliding sashes.	II
Sewerby House; 54.10339°N 0.16095°W		c. 1714	The country house is in rendered brick on a plinth, with stone dressings, quoins, string courses and a slate roof. There are three storeys and seven bays, the middle three bays projecting slightly, and later full-height bowed wings. In the centre is a semicircular portico with Doric columns and a garland frieze. The windows are sashes with moulded stone architraves and keystones, the central window on the middle floor with a round-arched head.	I
The Old Laundry, Sewerby House; 54.10358°N 0.16131°W	—	18th century	The original stable block, later used for other purposes, is in brick, with rusticated stone quoins. There are two storeys and five bays, with a pediment over the middle three bays. The central doorway ha a rusticated surround and a triple keystone, and above it is a round-arched window with a rusticated head breaking through the pediment. The ground floor windows have been altered.	II*
Farm buildings, Marton Manor; 54.11073°N 0.16327°W	—	1775	The farm buildings to the northwest of the house are in brick with pantile roofs, and consist of barns and stables. One barn is dated, and has iron clamps, tumbled brickwork to the gable end, and a brick eaves cornice, and it contains two cart doors and slit vents.	II
Marton Manor; 54.11045°N 0.16360°W		Late 18th century	The house is in brick with a Welsh slate roof. There are three storeys and four bays. The main doorway has pilasters, an entablature and side lights, and there is a round-headed doorway to the right. The windows are sashes.	II
10 Main Street; 54.10131°N 0.16710°W		Late 18th or early 19th century	The house is in brick, with a brick eaves cornice and a pantile roof. There are two storeys and two bays. The central doorway has a plain surround, and the windows are horizontally sliding sashes.	II
32 Main Street; 54.10189°N 0.16510°W		18th or early 19th century	The house is in stone, with a brick eaves cornice and a pantile roof. There are two storeys and two bays. It contains a doorway with a moulded surround, two sash windows, one horizontally sliding, and two small windows. To the right is a lower section with garage doors.	II
Stable block northwest of Sewerby House; 54.10350°N 0.16187°W		c. 1810	The stable block is in painted stone, with rusticated stone quoins, a sill band, and hipped slate roofs. There are two storeys, and they form three ranges round a courtyard. The western front has five bays, the second and fourth projecting and pedimented. These bays contain a round-headed doorway, above which is a segmental-headed window, and a circular window in the tympanum, all with rusticated surrounds. The southern front has five bays and a central recessed Doric portico with a pediment. This is flanked by large bow windows, and on the roof is a cupola containing a clock face, which was added in 1847.	II*
25–39 Main Street; 54.10185°N 0.16575°W		Early 19th century	A terrace of houses in brick, with a brick eaves cornice, a pantile roof, and two storeys. The left building has two bays and the others have one each. The left building is a shop, it is stuccoed and contains a shopfront. The other houses each have a doorway with a segmental head, and the windows are a mix of modern windows and sashes, some horizontally sliding.	II
Marton Grange; 54.11046°N 0.16134°W	—	Early 19th century	The house is in brick, with lion's mask guttering and a hipped Welsh slate roof. There are two storeys and three bays. On the front is a bowed porch, and the windows are sashes with brick voussoirs.	II
Pigeon Cote; 54.10364°N 0.15644°W		Early 19th century	The pigeoncote, in the grounds of Home Farm, is in buff brick on a stone plinth, with stone dressings, brick corner pilasters, and a dentilled eaves course. There is a rectangular plan and two storeys. On the front is a doorway with a round brick arch, stone voussoirs and a keystone, and above is a similar window. Inside there are nesting boxes and ledges.	II
The Ship Public House; 54.10160°N 0.16423°W		Early to mid-19th century	The public house is in red brick, with end pilasters, an eaves cornice, and a pantile roof. There are two storeys and attics, and three bays, and a single-storey extension to the left. The central doorway has pilasters, an entablature, panelled reveals, a rectangular fanlight and a cornice. The windows are sashes with rusticated lintels and fluted keystones, and there are two gabled roof dormers.	II
Tower in the grounds of Nettlehole; 54.10981°N 0.16182°W		Early to mid-19th century	The tower, which formerly housed a hydraulic ram, is in brick with a Welsh slate roof. It contains a doorway, above which is a sash window. Attached on the left is a later garage.	II
Sewerby School; 54.10461°N 0.16513°W		1849	The school, later a private house, was designed by Scott and Moffatt. It is in yellow brick, with stone dressings, and a slate roof with ridge and gable coping. On the left is a two-storey gabled bay with a canted bay window, and paired lancet windows and a trefoil above. To the right is a single-storey three-bay range, the middle bay projecting and gabled. The gabled porch is on the left return and contains an arched entrance and a datestone. At the rear are sash windows.	II
Terrace balustrade, wall and archway, Sewerby House; 54.10307°N 0.16089°W		c. 1850	The balustrade on the terrace to the south of the hall, is on plinths, and carries statues of Ceres and Flora. It joins the brick garden walls that contain two elliptical archways.	II*
Courtyard Archway, Sewerby House; 54.10343°N 0.16137°W		Mid-19th century	The archway to the northwest of the house consists of a round-headed arch with a moulded surround, Doric pilasters and an entablature with a blocking course raised in the centre and containing a Greek key over which is a heraldic emblem. On each side, in front of the arch, are statues of dogs on plinths.	II*
Gate House, walls and gate piers, Sewerby House; 54.10223°N 0.16399°W		Mid-19th century	The gatehouse at the western entrance to the grounds of the house is in yellow brick with stone dressings. It consists of a Doric arch with a panelled soffit, an entablature and a pediment flanked by lodges. The lodges are in yellow brick with rusticated quoins, a stone eaves cornice and a hipped roof. Each lodge has a single storey and a square plan, and it contains a doorway with a moulded surround and a cornice, and the windows have moulded surrounds and keystones. The gates are in iron, and the gateway is flanked by curving walls with stone coping on a plinth, and gate piers.	II*
St John's Church, Sewerby; 54.10355°N 0.16454°W		1846–48	The church was designed by George Gilbert Scott in Norman style. It is built in sandstone with slate roofs, and consists of a nave, a north transept, a chancel, a northeast vestry, and a steeple at the southeast corner of the nave. The steeple has a slender tower with engaged shafts, two-light bell openings in arcades, and a splay-footed lead-covered spire. The openings in the church have round-arched heads, and at the west end is a large window with three orders flanked by three-arched arcades. The south doorway is in a gabled projection, and has three orders, and three shafts in the jambs with reeded and foliage capitals.	II*
Conservatory, Sewerby House; 54.10344°N 0.16059°W		1848	The conservatory to the east of the house was designed by Henry F. Lockwood, and restored by Smith and Broderck in 1889. There is a single storey, a rectangular plan, and a front of nine bays. It has a stone base, the bays are divided by yellow brick pilasters with stone capitals, and above is a cornice and a blocking course which rises in the centre. The doorway is in the centre and the windows are sashes.	II*
Flamborough railway station and wall 54.11276°N 0.17285°W		Mid-19th century	The disused station building is in yellow brick, partly rendered, with stone dressings, full-height brick pilasters, sill bands, a brick eaves cornice, and hipped slate roofs with ridge tiles. There are two storeys and two bays, the right bay projecting, and a single-storey extension to the right. The doorway in the angle has brick voussoirs. The windows are sashes, and there are two canted bay windows. Attached to the extension is a retaining wall with pilasters and a cornice.	II
Lodge No. 16, Sewerby House; 54.10283°N 0.16439°W		Mid-19th century	The lodge at the western entrance to the grounds of the house is in yellow brick on a plinth, with rusticated quoins, a stone moulded eaves cornice, and a hipped slate roof. There is one storey and three bay. In the centre is a doorway with pilasters and a moulded cornice, and this is flanked by sash windows with stone surrounds and keystones.	II
Sewerby Grange; 54.10121°N 0.17014°W		1865	Originally a vicarage, it is in yellow brick, with stone dressings, a moulded string course, and a Welsh slate roof. There are two storeys and attics, and a garden front of three bays, the outer bays projecting and gabled. The left bay has a canted bay window, and the other windows vary. The entrance front has three bays, the middle bay projecting and gabled, and containing a doorway with a semicircular fanlight and a hood mould.	II

== See also ==
- Listed buildings in Bridlington (Old Town area)
- Listed buildings in Bridlington (Quay area)
