= Christ Church, Bridlington =

Church in Bridlington, East Riding of Yorkshire, England

Coordinates: 54.0847°N 0.1932°W

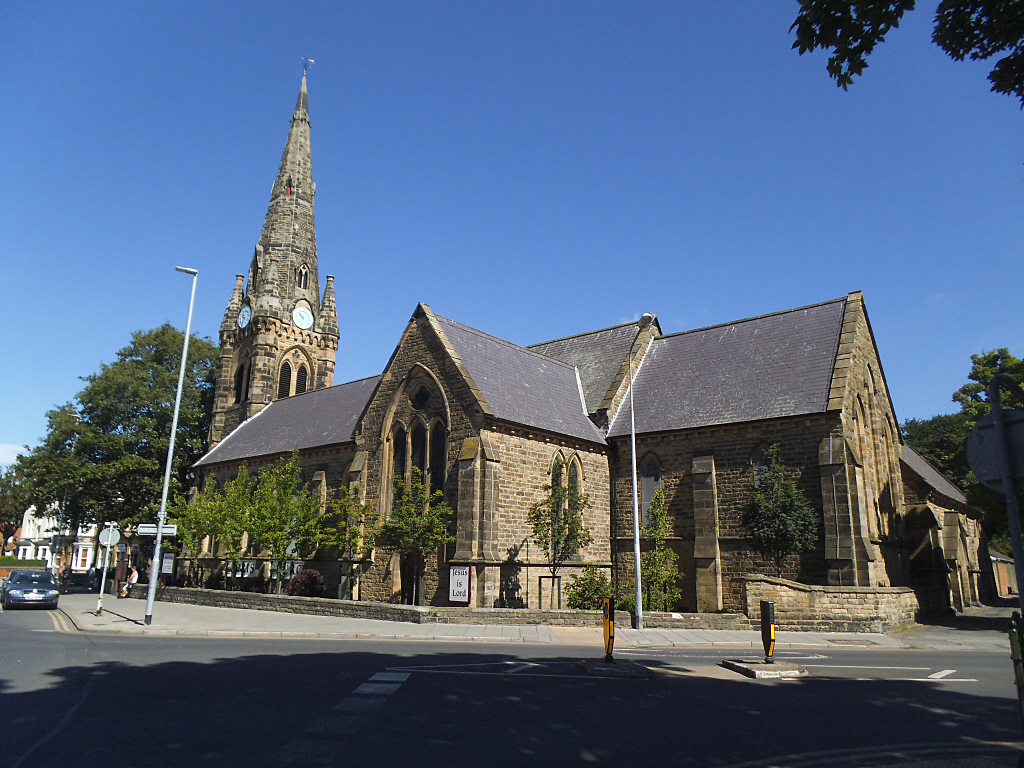
The church, in 2017

Christ Church is an Anglican church in Bridlington, a town in the East Riding of Yorkshire, in England.

The church was built between 1840 and 1841, to a design by George Gilbert Scott and William Bonython Moffatt, and could originally seat 611 worshippers. The aisles were widened and the chancel lengthened in 1851, then in 1859 a steeple was constructed. Originally a chapel of ease to Bridlington Priory, it was given its own parish in 1871. A hall was added from 1884 to 1885, then in the early 20th century a further hall was constructed and later linked to the church, while further blocks were added to the north of the nave. From 1962 to 1963, the interior was redesigned by George Pace, the work including new vaulting. The building has been grade II listed since 1976.

The church is built of sandstone with slate roofs, and consists of a nave, north and south aisles, north and south transepts, a chancel and a southwest steeple. The steeple has a tower with four stages, and octagonal angle buttresses rising to turrets with octagonal pinnacles. It contains lancet windows and bell openings, and clock faces, and has a tall spire with two tiers of lucarnes. Inside is a 17th-century font with an 18th-century cover, brought from York Minster, a west gallery and a reredos designed by Walker, Son and Field in 1924.

== See also ==
- Listed buildings in Bridlington (Quay area)
