= Brunswick Hotel, Bridlington =

Hotel in Bridlington, East Riding of Yorkshire, England

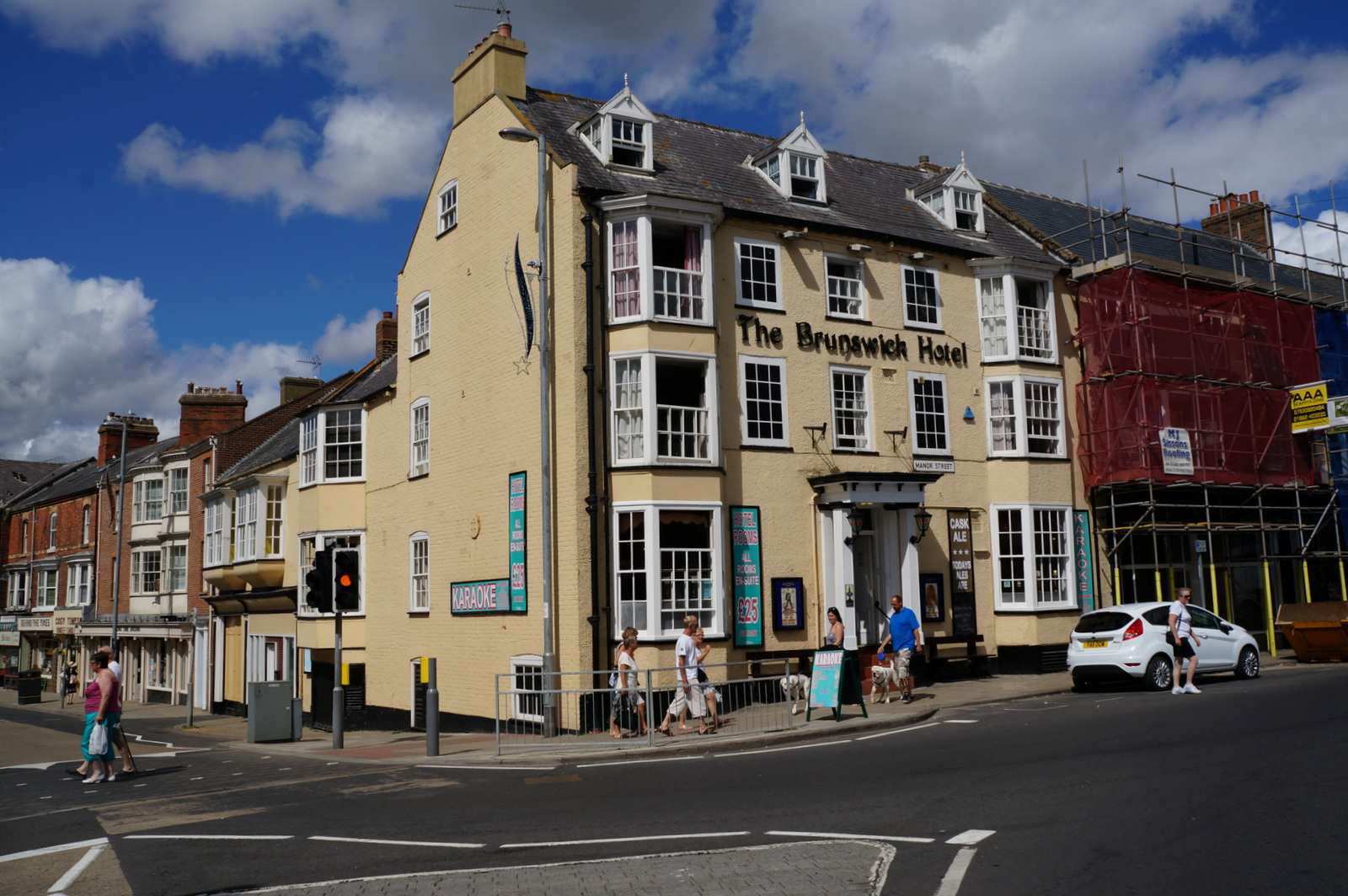
The building, in 2014

The Brunswick Hotel is a historic building in Bridlington, a town in the East Riding of Yorkshire, in England.

The hotel was constructed around 1800. In the 19th century, bay windows were added to the front, and late in the century, a new wing was added. The building was grade II listed in 1976. In the 2020s, the hotel was owned by Harrison Leisure, in which period it had ten bedrooms. In 2023, the upstairs dining room was converted into a sports bar.

The hotel is rendered, and has a slate roof with a coped gable and a kneeler on the left. There are three storeys and attics, and five bays. In the centre is a Doric porch, and the outer bays contain three-storey canted bay windows. The other windows are sashes, those on the left return with segmental heads, and there are three gabled roof dormers. At the rear is a two-storey wing, and a wing with oriel windows.

== See also ==
- Listed buildings in Bridlington (Quay area)
