= Old Floral Pavilion =

Building in Bridlington, East Riding of Yorkshire, England

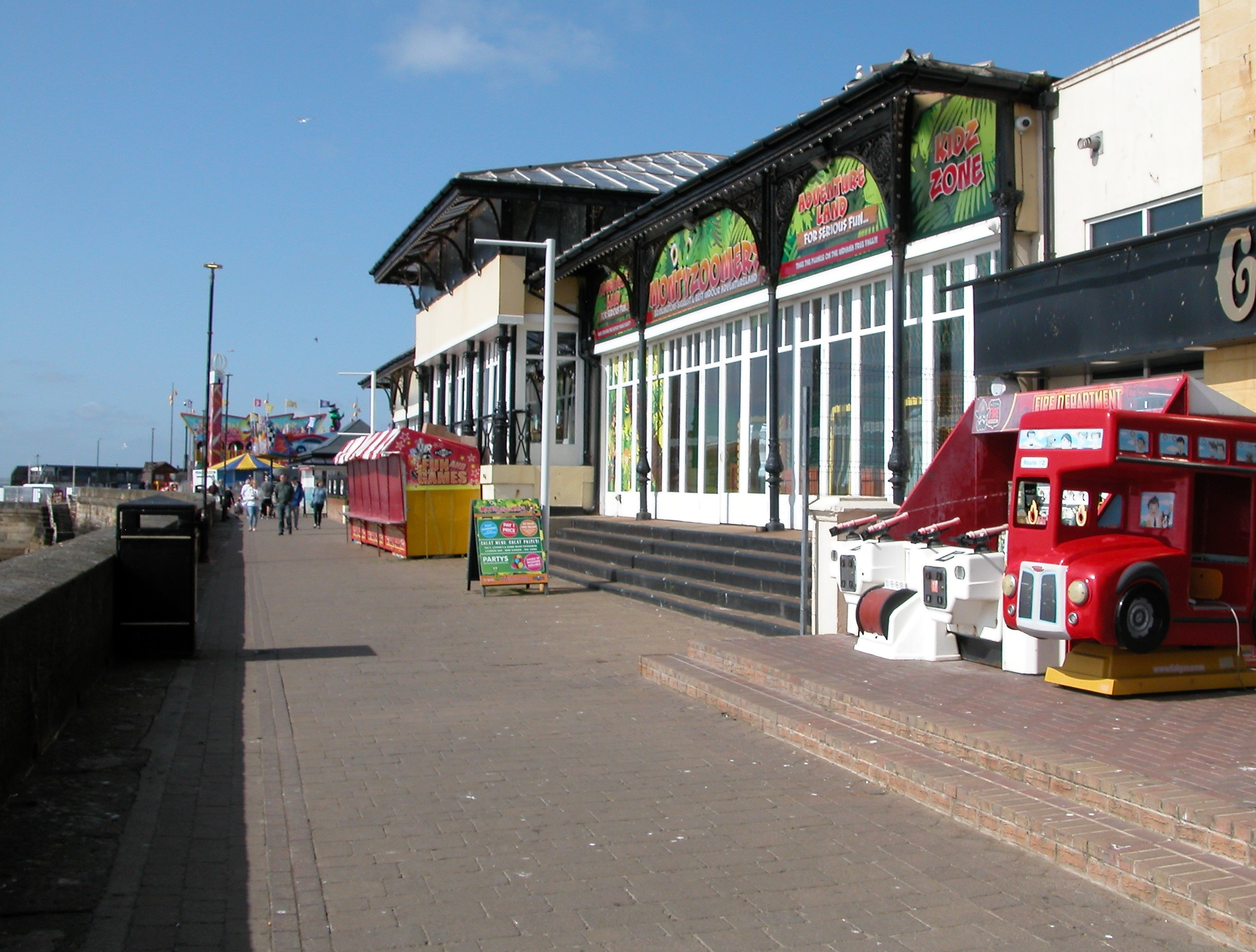
- The building in 2023

- Location within East Riding of Yorkshire

General information
- Location: Royal Princes Parade, Bridlington, East Riding of Yorkshire, England
- Year built: 1904
- Renovated: 1907 and c. 1960 (extended); Late 20th century (altered); 2024 (refurbished)

Listed Building – Grade II
- Official name: Floral Pavilion
- Designated: 6 December 1993
- Reference no.: 1334383

The Old Floral Pavilion is a historic building on Royal Princes Parade in Bridlington, a town in the East Riding of Yorkshire, England.

The building was constructed in 1904 as a venue for public events, particularly concerts. In about 1907, it was extended to incorporate a bandstand which had been built around 1860. The building was extended again around 1960, perhaps in two stages. In the late 20th century, there were small further extensions to the north and south. It has housed a variety of uses, including restaurants, bars, and soft play areas. The building was Grade II listed in 1993. In 2022, the building was purchased by its tenant, Harrison Leisure, which in 2024 completed a refurbishment, at a cost of £175,000.

The seafront pavilion has a cast iron frame, and is largely glazed, with a partial roof in Welsh slate added later. The pillars are decorated, and have spandrel brackets carrying an overhanging glazed roof. Between the pillars are timber and glazed screens, and on the roof are two domed ventilators. The original cast iron interior largely survives.

== See also ==
- Listed buildings in Bridlington (Quay area)
