= Malton Community Hospital =

Hospital in North Yorkshire, England

- York and Scarborough Teaching Hospitals NHS Foundation Trust
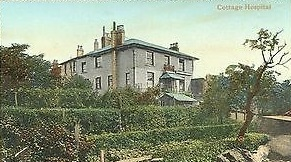
- Malton Cottage Hospital

- Shown in North Yorkshire

Geography
- Location: Middlecave Road, Malton, North Yorkshire, England
- Coordinates: 54.1372°N 0.8065°W

Organisation
- Care system: NHS

Services
- Emergency department: No

History
- Founded: 1905

Links
- Website: www.yorkhospitals.nhs.uk/our-hospitals/malton-community-hospital/
- Lists: Hospitals in England

Malton Community Hospital is a health facility in Middlecave Road, Malton, North Yorkshire, England. It is managed by York and Scarborough Teaching Hospitals NHS Foundation Trust. The community inpatient unit is run by Humber Teaching NHS Foundation Trust.

== History ==
The land for the hospital was provided at a nominal rent by Earl Fitzwilliam. It was opened by Countess Fitzwilliam as Malton Cottage Hospital in 1905. It joined the National Health Service in 1948 and, after becoming the Malton, Norton & District Hospital, it was the subject of a major reconfiguration in 2010. The One-Stop Urology Diagnostic Centre, situated within Malton Hospital, was opened in January 2017.
