= Bridlington Hospital =

Hospital in the East Riding of Yorkshire, England

- York and Scarborough Teaching Hospitals NHS Foundation Trust
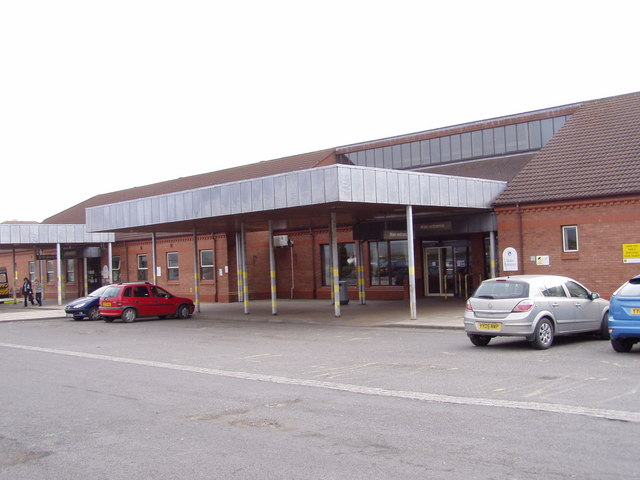
- Bridlington Hospital

- Shown in the East Riding of Yorkshire

Geography
- Location: Bessingby Road, Bridlington, East Riding of Yorkshire, England
- Coordinates: 54.0868°N 0.2159°W

Organisation
- Care system: NHS

Services
- Emergency department: No, Urgent Treatment Centre only

History
- Founded: 1989

Links
- Website: www.yorkhospitals.nhs.uk/our-hospitals/bridlington-hospital/
- Lists: Hospitals in England

Bridlington Hospital is a health facility in Bessingby Road, Bridlington, East Riding of Yorkshire, England. It is managed by York and Scarborough Teaching Hospitals NHS Foundation Trust.

== History ==
The hospital was commissioned to replace three former facilities: Lloyd Hospital in Quay Road, the Avenue Hospital in Westgate and the Bempton Lane Hospital. Built at a cost of £16 million, it opened to patients in March 1988. The official opening was conducted by the Duchess of Gloucester in May 1989. In February 2018 the local MP, Sir Greg Knight, expressed concern that the hospital was being under-utilized with three wards remaining empty.
