= Scarborough Hospital =

Hospital in Scarborough, North Yorkshire, England

- York and Scarborough Teaching Hospitals NHS Foundation Trust
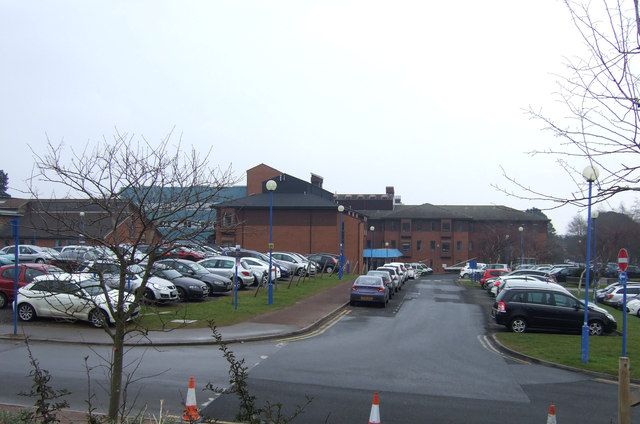
- Scarborough Hospital

- Shown in North Yorkshire

Geography
- Location: Scarborough, North Yorkshire, England
- Coordinates: 54.2819°N 0.4346°W

Organisation
- Care system: NHS
- Type: District General
- Affiliated university: Coventry University, Scarborough

Services
- Emergency department: Yes

History
- Founded: 1936

Links
- Website: www.yorkhospitals.nhs.uk/our-hospitals/scarborough-hospital/
- Lists: Hospitals in England

Scarborough Hospital, formerly Scarborough General Hospital is an NHS district general hospital in Scarborough, North Yorkshire, England. It is run by the York and Scarborough Teaching Hospitals NHS Foundation Trust.

== History ==
In the early 1930s it was decided to build a new general hospital for Scarborough; the cost of construction of £135,000 was financed in part by the sale of the site of a former hospital at Spring Hill and in part by public subscription. The new hospital was opened by the Duke of Kent on 23 October 1936. After the hospital joined the National Health Service in 1948, a major new extension followed in 1988.

The hospital came under the management of the Scarborough and North East Yorkshire Healthcare NHS Trust in 1994 but on 1 July 2012 the Scarborough and North East Yorkshire Healthcare NHS Trust was absorbed by the York Teaching Hospital NHS Foundation Trust.

A new surgical ward, known as Maple Ward, was built by Elliott Off-Site Building Solutions at a cost of £2.4 million and opened in spring 2011. Another new surgical ward, called Lilac ward, was built by Kier Group at a cost of £5 million and opened in March 2015.

A new two-storey urgent and emergency care centre opened in May 2025. The project cost £47 million and was started in 2022 with an initial completion date in autumn 2024; however this was delayed due to a faulty boiler. The centre includes a new CT scanner and a dedicated isolation room for highly infectious diseases.

== Services ==
Annually, the hospital sees an average of 127,000 patient attendances to its emergency department, in addition to 119,000 inpatients and 390,000 outpatient appointments.

== See also ==
- List of hospitals in England
