= Bessingby =

Village in the East Riding of Yorkshire, England

Coordinates: 54.076396°N 0.230009°W

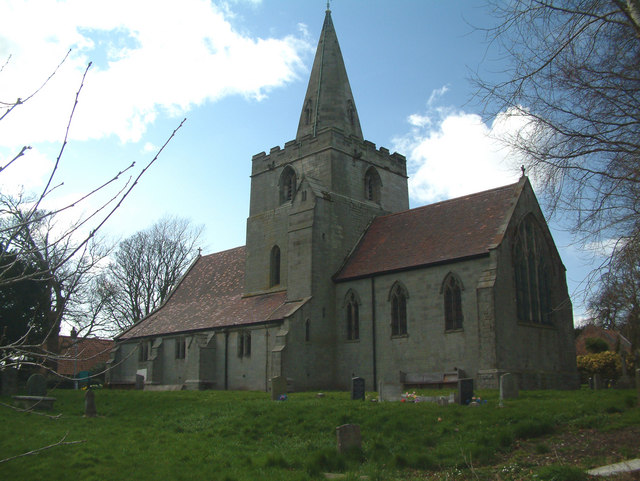
- Church of St Magnus, Bessingby

- Location within the East Riding of Yorkshire
- OS grid reference: TA159659
  - London: 175 mi (282 km) S
- Civil parish: Bridlington
- Unitary authority: East Riding of Yorkshire
- Ceremonial county: East Riding of Yorkshire
- Region: Yorkshire and the Humber
- Country: England
- Sovereign state: United Kingdom
- Post town: BRIDLINGTON
- Postcode district: YO16
- Dialling code: 01262
- Police: Humberside
- Fire: Humberside
- Ambulance: Yorkshire
- UK Parliament: Bridlington and The Wolds

Bessingby is a village and former civil parish, now in the parish of Bridlington, in the East Riding of Yorkshire, England. It lies immediately south-east from the A614, approximately 1.5 miles (2.4 km) south-west from Bridlington. In 1931 the parish had a population of 106.

== History ==
Bessingby appears to be a site of Prehistoric and Roman occupation. Fragments of Neolithic axes have been discovered, and cropmarks indicating trackways, ditch boundaries and enclosures have been seen at Bessingby High Field, 0.5 miles (0.8 km) to the south of the village, and just to the east, near to the A165 road. A further archeological site is that of a now non-existent water mill, noted as extant in 1418, that could have been sited on Gypsey Race.

The name Bessingby derives from the Old Norse Besingbȳ or Basingbȳ meaning 'Besing's' or 'Basing's village'.

In the Domesday Book of 1086 the village is written as "Basingebi”or "Basinghebi". It consisted of 3 villagers, 1 freeman and 4 burgesses, 37 ploughlands, 1.5 plough teams, a meadow of 8 acres (0.032 km^{2}) and a church. In 1066 lordship of the manor was held by Earl Morcar, being transferred to King William in 1086. The Conqueror gave the village to Gilbert de Gant, his nephew; its ownership was later transferred to Bridlington Priory during the reign of Henry I.

In 1808 Benjamin Pitt Capper recorded 17 houses and a Bessingby population of 87. By 1837 Moule noted 83 inhabitants, and St Magnus's church, rebuilt in 1766, containing monuments to H. Hudson (d.1826), and his wife Lady Ann (d.1818). Hudson's seat was Bessingby Hall at the north of the village, inherited by his son Sir James Hudson (1810–1885), a private secretary under William IV, later in Foreign Service at Rio de Janeiro and Turin. In July 1825 William Scoresby, Arctic explorer and scientist, became curate of Bessingby, before leaving to become Chaplain of the Mariners' Church, a floating ministry at Liverpool, in November 1826. In 1892 Bessingby and its parish contained 171 inhabitants, within an area of 1,269 acres (5.14 km^{2}). Agricultural production was chiefly wheat, oats and beans. By then, the manor, Hall and estate had been purchased from the Hudson family by George Wright JP, who provided in his will for the construction of the new village church, St Magnus.

On 1 April 1935 the civil parish was abolished and merged with Bridlington and Carnaby.

== Buildings ==
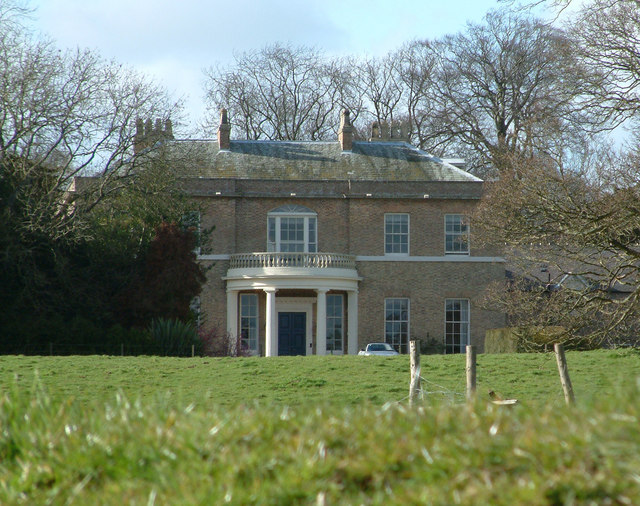
Bessingby Hall

Bessingby's Grade II* listed Anglican church is dedicated to St Magnus. Built in 1893–94 by Temple Moore, in 14th-century style, it replaced an earlier 1767 brick church. A crenellated tower with short steeple sits centrally between nave and chancel. Detailing is of Decorated Gothic style, with stained glass by Kempe, dated 1900. There is a 1570 cup by Robert Beckwith, and a 1704 paten by Seth Lofthouse. Tablet monuments are to the Hudson family, by R. J. Wyatt. Pevsner's view of the church is that "It is competent, but no more".

Bessingby Hall, Grade II listed, was built by Thomas Cundy in 1807, in yellow brick with sash windows and Grecian portico. Further listed buildings attached to the Hall are its former Keepers' Cottage, and a pigeoncote, both 17th century.
