= Sewerby =

Village in the East Riding of Yorkshire, England

Coordinates: 54.101378°N 0.166466°W

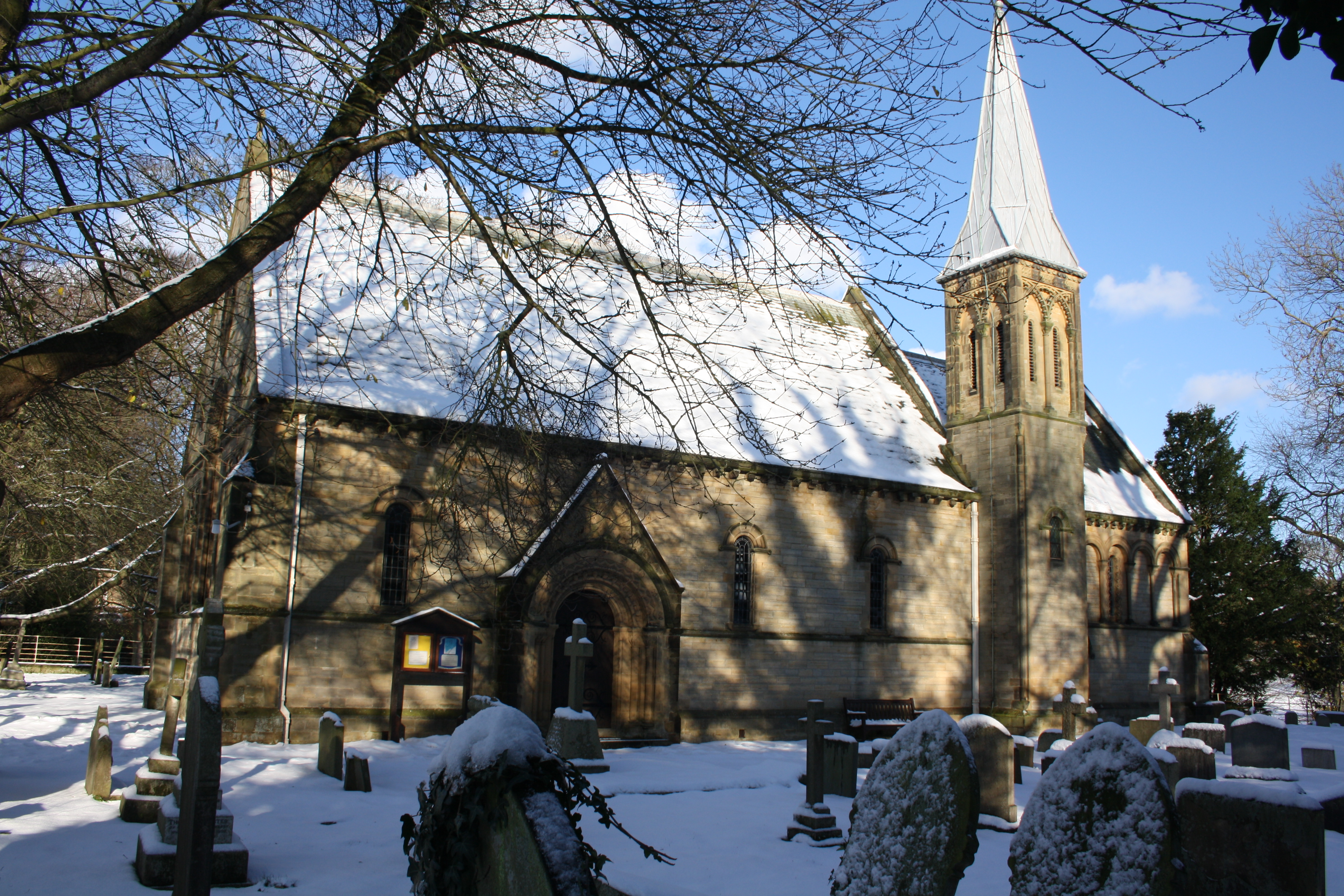
- St John the Evangelist Church

- Location within the East Riding of Yorkshire
- OS grid reference: TA199688
- Civil parish: Bridlington
- Unitary authority: East Riding of Yorkshire
- Ceremonial county: East Riding of Yorkshire
- Region: Yorkshire and the Humber
- Country: England
- Sovereign state: United Kingdom
- Post town: BRIDLINGTON
- Postcode district: YO15
- Dialling code: 01262
- Police: Humberside
- Fire: Humberside
- Ambulance: Yorkshire
- UK Parliament: Bridlington and The Wolds

Sewerby is a village in the East Riding of Yorkshire, England approximately 1 mile (1.6 km) north-east of Bridlington on the North Sea coast. The village is on Bridlington Bay and is the only south-facing resort in the East Riding of Yorkshire.

Sewerby forms part of the civil parish of Bridlington, though between 1854 and 1935, it was in its own parish with nearby Marton and Grindale. Sewerby is home to one of the East Riding's most popular tourist attractions, Sewerby Hall. The hall is a Grade I listed building and is home to the Museum of East Yorkshire, including a room dedicated to the aviator, Amy Johnson.

The church dedicated to St John the Evangelist was designated a Grade II* listed building in 1976 and is now recorded in the National Heritage List for England, maintained by Historic England.

== History ==
Sewerby is mentioned in the Domesday Book of 1086; "In Siwardbi, Carle and Torchil had two manors, of six carucates and a half. It is now waste." This indicates the origin of the name: It was the (by) abode of Siward. (This is a Danish personal name, and one who bore it was the Governor of Northumbria). And, that Sewerby had two manors which were owned by Carle and Torchil, though no subsequent reference deals with more than one. And finally, that after William put down the English revolt in 1069, much of the land was now waste.

The two manors, formally owned by Carle & Torchil, were passed down in 1086 to Robert Count of Mortain and the Earl of Cornwall, the half-brother to William the Conqueror. Though, in the year 1088 Count Robert had his estate confiscated. There is no record of the fate of Robert's under-tenant, Richard de Surdeval, though it is possible his family survived as the de Sywardbys, using the name of the village.

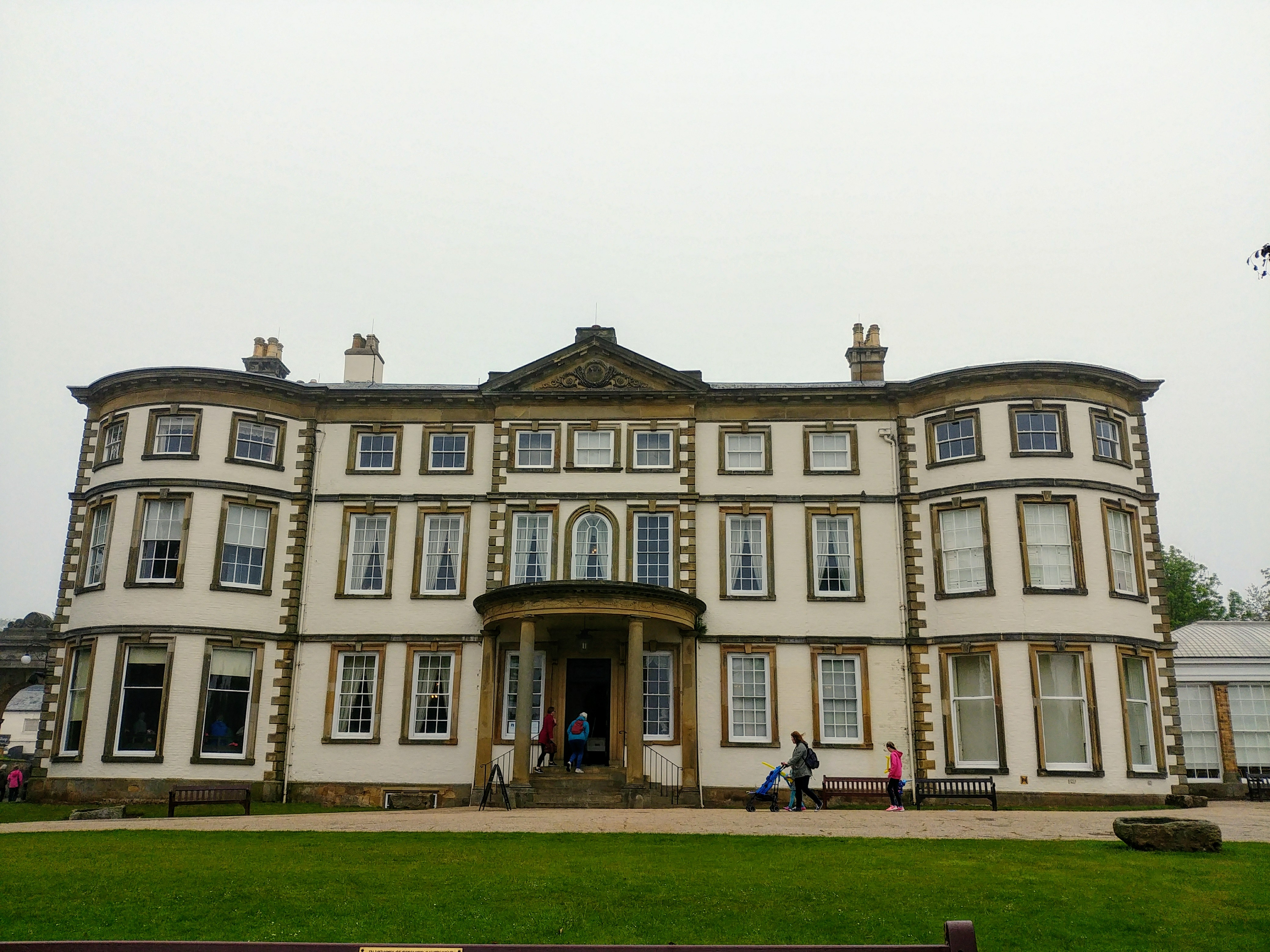
Sewerby Hall

The estate of Mortain passed to the Paynel family and then on to the archbishops of Canterbury. The land was held for them by the Meynells. The Meynells then granted land to Osbert de Sywardby sometime in the 1170s.

The de Sywardbys appear to have owned most of the land around Sewerby and Marton. Their position strengthened by marriages with the de Martons and the de Bucktons, and during the 14th century, three generations of the de Sywardby family were knighted.

In 1234 Robert de Sywardby held three carucates of land with William de Sywardby holding four carucates by 1299. Robert of Sewerby was lord of the manor in 1316 and the family held it until the death of William de Sywardby in 1452. Williams's daughter held the land until her son sold the land to Ralph Raysing in 1545 and so the estate finally passed out of the hands of the descendants of Osbert de Sywardby after nearly 400 years. In the same year Raysing also bought other properties in Sewerby. Raysing held the land until 1567 when he sold it to John Carliell.

The Carliell family held the land until 1714 when it was sold to John Graeme. John Graeme was actually living in the manor house when he bought the land. It is said that John and his son Robert made their fortunes by acting as agents for a Lady Boococke, a considerable landowner in Bridlington. Sewerby House was almost re-built by John Graeme between the years 1714 and 1720, when ten houses were demolished to improve the grounds of the estate. There are however traces of the old house still to be seen inside the hall, most notably the Tudor doorway in the basement.

The Sewerby and Marton Inclosures Act 1802 (42 Geo. 3. c. cvi) divided up the land around Sewerby and Sewerby Hall, which was further refined in 1850. The enclosure of land moved the main street in the village further west, before the enclosure, the main road in Sewerby was east of Sewerby hall. The church, dedicated to St John the Evangelist, was built between 1846 and 1848, from sandstone transported from Wakefield. A chapel was first mentioned in historical documents from 1319. This had fallen into disuse by 1449 and another chapel was paid for. The church, which was designed by Sir Gilbert Scott, is now a grade II* listed structure.

The village of Sewerby, as spelt through the ages;

1086 Siuuardbi, Siward Bi
1284 Sywardby
1312 Siwardeby, Sywardeby, Syuuardby
1315 Seuerdby, Siwardeby, Sywardby
1346 Sywardeby
1650 Sewrby

Originally, Marton railway station (later named Flamborough railway station) was the nearest station to Sewerby, however, whilst Bempton is nearer at 2.2 miles (3.5 km), the route from the station to Sewerby is inadvisable for walkers, so Bridlington is often advised to be the best station for access to the locality. The village is on the northern edge of Bridlington Bay, and it fronts onto the shore in a southwards direction, making it the only seaside resort in the East Riding of Yorkshire that faces south. In 1955, Bridlington Council put forward a plan to build a light railway to Sewerby hall. Objectors stated it would ruin agricultural land. Whilst the light railway wasn't built, there are now land-trains between Bridlington and Sewerby Hall.

The 21st century Sewerby has a restaurant, two churches and the Ship Inn, which like the cricket pitch, has views out over the sea. The village is also home to Bondville, the last remaining model village in Yorkshire.

== Governance ==
Population of Sewerby Township (later Sewerby-cum-Marton Parish)
1801	1811	1821	1831	1841	1851	1861	1871	1881	1891	1901	1911	1921	1931
279	248	317	352	352	356	342	452	547	628	330	306	352	383

In 1854, Sewerby-cum-Marton was created as a parish, separated off from the parish of Bridlington. At the time it was in the wapentake of Dickering, and had an area of 2,036 acres (824 ha), though some 101 acres (41 ha) of that was designated as foreshore. In 1935, the parish was sub-sumed back into the civil parish of Bridlington, which now accounts for its population statistics. The area is represented in the Houses of Parliament as part of the Bridlington and The Wolds constituency.

== Notable residents ==
- Helene Palmer (1928–2011), actress who portrayed Ida Clough on Coronation Street.
- Frances Crawshaw (1876–1968), painter and botanical artist.
