= West End House =

West End House is the name of:

- West End House, Askrigg, in North Yorkshire, England
- West End House, Bridlington, in the East Riding of Yorkshire, England
