= Star Inn =

The Star Inn is the name of:

- The Star Inn, pub in Harome in North Yorkshire, in England
- Star Inn, Bridlington, pub in Bridington in the East Riding of Yorkshire, in England
