= Robert of Cricklade =

12th-century English writer and Augustinian canon

- Born: c. 1100
- Died: between 1174 and 1179
- Resting place: probably St Frideswide's Priory in Oxford
- Occupations: Augustinian canon, prior, writer
- Writing career
- Period: Angevin
- Genre: Religious writings

Robert of Cricklade (c. 1100–1174 × 1179) was a medieval English writer and prior of St Frideswide's Priory in Oxford. He was a native of Cricklade and taught before becoming a cleric. He wrote several theological works as well as a lost biography of Thomas Becket, the murdered Archbishop of Canterbury.

== Life ==
Robert was from Cricklade in Wiltshire and was of Anglo-Saxon descent. At some point, he taught in the schools, where he was called "master" for his learning. He became an Augustinian canon at Cirencester Abbey before becoming prior of the priory of St Frideswide in Oxford, an office he occupied from sometime before the end of 1139, when he is first securely attested in the office, until after 1174, his last appearance as prior. In 1158 he went to Rome, extending his travels to Sicily and Paris on the same trip. Another trip was to Scotland in the 1160s. Possibly he also traveled to Rome in 1141 and Paris in 1147, but these trips are not securely attested. Although earlier historians claimed that he was chancellor of Oxford, this office did not yet exist during Robert's lifetime. There were students at Oxford in his lifetime, though his precise role in local teaching is unclear.

== Writings ==
Robert was the author of many works, most of which survive in one or more manuscripts, but some of which are lost. A commentary on the Psalms is also attributed to him, preserved in a single manuscript, but this is more likely the work of Robert of Bridlington.

=== De connubio Iacob ===
On the Marriage of Jacob was written while Robert was at Cirencester. It is an allegorical treatment of the Jacob story from the Bible, written after 1137 and before Robert's move to Oxford in 1138/9. He mentions Bernard of Clairvaux and William of Malmesbury as major influences on his writing. It survives in five manuscripts:

- Antwerp, Museum Plantin-Moretus, MS M. 103 (catalogue no. 107) (once belonged to All Souls College, Oxford)
- Hereford Cathedral, MS P.iv.8 (from Cirencester Abbey)
- London, British Library, Royal MS 8 E. ii
- Oxford, Bodleian Library, MS Laud Misc. 725 (from Reading Abbey), fols 92r–184v
- Oxford, Balliol College, MS 167

=== Defloratio historie naturalis Plinii ===
The Anthology of Pliny's Natural History is an epitome of Pliny the Elder's Natural History dedicated to King Henry II of England. It is of some importance in the transmission of Pliny's ideas to medieval Europe, although it is less important as a witness to Pliny's text than once thought.

The book appears to have originally been composed in the 1130s, perhaps as a text for his students, and only later dedicated it to King Henry. It has been printed in a critical edition.

The work survives in five manuscripts:

- Eton College, MS 134
- Hereford Cathedral, MS P.v.10, fols. 125r–177r
- London, British Library, Royal MS 15 C. xiv
- Biblioteca Apostolica Vaticana MS Vat. Regin. lat. 598 + 198
- Wolfenbüttel, Herzog August Bibliothek, Cod. Guelf. 160.1 Extrav.

=== Speculum fidei ===
The Mirror of Faith was a theological work that mainly collected texts from the Old and New Testament discussing basic theological concepts, dedicated to Robert de Beaumont, 2nd Earl of Leicester. It was written between 1164 and 1168, but the surviving manuscript opens with an addition noting a decretal of Pope Alexander III from 1170. It is best known for Robert's refutation of the views of Peter Lombard's theology. It survives in one manuscript:

- Cambridge, Corpus Christi College, MS 380, fols 2r–132v

=== Omelie super Ezechielem ===
The Homilies on Ezechiel are a series of 42 homilies on the Book of Ezekiel and were written about 1172. They are a continuation of the homilies on Ezekiel by Gregory the Great. The work survives in two manuscripts:

- Cambridge, Pembroke College, MS 30 (from Bury St Edmunds Abbey)
- Hereford Cathedral, O.iii.10 (from Cirencester Abbey)

=== Vita et miracula sancte Thome Cantuariensis ===
Robert wrote his Life and Miracles of St Thomas of Canterbury around 1173 to 1174. Though lost, it is one of the main sources for an Icelandic saga on Becket entitled Thómas saga erkibyskups, which survives in a copy dating from the first half of the 14th century. This saga preserves several otherwise unknown details about Becket's life and remains one of the main sources for Becket studies. Robert's life also was a source for the work of Benet of St Albans, another biographer of Becket. A modern historian partially reconstructed Robert's biography from these sources. A major source for Robert's work on Becket was the writings of John of Salisbury. A modern biographer of Becket, Frank Barlow, speculates that Robert's biography was lost because it favored the king's side of the story, rather than Becket's.

=== Letter to Benedict of Peterborough ===
Benedict of Peterborough quotes in his Miracula S. Thome Cantuariensis a letter to him from Robert, giving an account of his healing from a serious illness, for which he credits the intercession of Thomas Becket. Another canon in Oxford, also named Robert, was similarly healed. The account is printed as part of the Rolls Series.

=== Life of St Magnus ===
The earliest account of the death of Magnus Erlendsson, Earl of Orkney, whose Latin original is lost but partially survives in an Icelandic translation was written by a 'Meistari Roðbert'. It has been suggested 'with some confidence' that this may be the work of Robert of Cricklade.

=== Vita sancte Frideswide ===
A Life of St Frideswide, on Frithuswith, the patron of Robert's priory in Oxford, has been shown to have been written by Robert, and has been critically edited. It is a revision of another earlier work. It survives in three manuscripts:

- Oxford, Bodleian Library, Laud Misc. 114, fols 132r–140r
- Cambridge, Gonville and Caius College, 129, fols 167r–177v
- Gotha, Forschungsbibliothek, MM. I.81, fols. 225v–230r

== Death and legacy ==
Robert died after 1174, and was probably buried in his priory. His successor was Philip of Oxford, who was in office by 1179. Besides his theological works, Robert also searched throughout England for Hebrew texts of the works of Josephus, according to Gerald of Wales, who claims in De principis instructione that Robert knew the Hebrew language.
