= Arthur Perry =

Arthur Perry may refer to:

- Arthur Perry (cricketer) (1840-1898), New Zealand cricketer
- Arthur Latham Perry (1830–1905), American economist
- Arthur Edgar Perry (1864–1925), organist and composer
- Art Perry (born 1946), American college basketball coach
