= Listed buildings in Bridlington (Old Town area) =

Bridlington is a civil parish in the county of the East Riding of Yorkshire, England. It contains about 190 listed buildings that are recorded in the National Heritage List for England. Of these, three are listed at Grade I, the highest of the three grades, 20 are at Grade II*, the middle grade, and the others are at Grade II, the lowest grade. The parish contains the seaside town of Bridlington and the surrounding area. This list contains the listed buildings in the area described by Pevsner and Neave as the Old Town area. This area is dominated by Bridlington Priory, and during the Middle Ages it became a marketing and commercial centre. It continues to be the commercial centre, containing the market, shops and offices, and, outside this, the area is residential. Most of the listed buildings in the area are houses and associated structures, shops and offices, and the others include hotels, public houses and cafés, the former gatehouse to the priory, a former school, parts of a former workhouse, cemetery buildings, two drinking fountains, a Methodist church, and a telephone kiosk.

== Key ==
Grade	Criteria
I	Buildings of exceptional interest, sometimes considered to be internationally important
II*	Particularly important buildings of more than special interest
II	Buildings of national importance and special interest

== Buildings ==
Name and location	Photograph	Date	Notes	Grade
Bridlington Priory; 54.09431°N 0.20179°W		c. 1132	The church, also known as the Parish Church of St Mary, contains remains of the original priory church, with later additions and alterations, including restorations by Sharpe and Paley in 1845–48, and by George Gilbert Scott between 1855 and 1885. It is built in stone, and consists of a nave with a clerestory, north and south aisles, a north porch, and two west towers in different styles. The northwest tower dates from the 13th century, it has four stages, and contains a round-headed west doorway, above which are windows and bell openings with hood moulds, and a parapet with blind pointed arcading. The southwest tower is mainly from the 15th century with the top added by Scott. It contains a doorway, windows of various styles, two rows of arcading, clock faces in the bell stage, and an open embattled parapet with ornate corner crocketed pinnacles.	I
The Bayle Gate; 54.09344°N 0.20357°W		c. 1388	The gatehouse is in freestone, the upper part was partially rebuilt in brick in the 17th century, and it formed the principal entrance to Bridlington Priory. The building has been converted into a museum. There are two storeys and three bays, flanked and divided by buttresses. The central bay contains an archway, and to the left is a smaller postern, both with pointed heads. Above the archway is a circular plaque with a coat of arms, and on the upper floor are two-light windows with quoined surrounds and hood moulds.	I
28 and 30 High Street; 54.09318°N 0.20625°W		17th century	Two rendered houses with a floor band, an eaves cornice, and a steep pantile roof with coped and rendered ends, and two storeys. The right house has three bays and sash windows. The doorway has a moulded surround, panelled reveals, a rectangular fanlight, an ornamental frieze and a cornice. The left house has two bays, a doorway with a three-light fanlight, and modern windows.	II
35 and 35A High Street; 54.09307°N 0.20653°W		17th century	The building is in painted brick, with a brick eaves cornice on the right and a steep pantile roof. There are two storeys and three bays, the left two bays projecting slightly. On the ground floor is a small early 19th-century shopfront with a bow window, to the right is a later shopfront, and to the left is a passage doorway. The upper floor contains three sash windows, and above are two sloped dormers.	II
24, 25A and 25B Market Place; 54.09502°N 0.20972°W		17th century	A row of three houses on a corner site, in rendered brick, with a wooden eaves cornice, and a steep pantile roof. There are two storeys and three bays. The ground floor has three doorways, two with rectangular fanlights, and the windows are sashes with painted lintels.	II
The Board Inn; 54.09337°N 0.20802°W		17th century	The public house is in two parts with pantile roofs. The older part is on the left, it is rendered, and has two storeys and three bays. On the ground floor is a modern public house front with a cornice. The upper floor has four fluted pilasters and a parapet with a moulded panel. It contains two sash windows, and above is a roof dormer. The taller right part dates from the 18th century, and is in painted brick. There are three storeys and two bays. On the left bay is a rectangular bay window containing pilaster mullions with carved capitals, and a cornice. On the right is a doorway with pilaster and a hood, and sash windows.	II
The Star Inn; 54.09344°N 0.21089°W		17th century (probable)	The public house is in painted brick, rendered on the front, on a rendered plinth, with applied timber framing on the upper floor, and a double span pantile roof with tumbled brickwork on the gable end. There are two storeys, and a double depth plan. On the right is a doorway with grooved pilasters, a decorative fascia, and a pedimented hood. The windows are sashes, mostly in pairs.	II
Hebblethwaite House; 54.09341°N 0.21026°W		c. 1670	The house, at one time a bank, is in brown brick on a rendered plinth, with brick rusticated quoins, a moulded string course, an ornamental coved eaves cornice, and a pantile roof. There are two storeys and attics, and eight bays. The fourth bay projects slightly, and originally contained the doorway, later converted into a window under a pediment. The outer bays contain doorways with pediments, the windows are mullioned and transomed, and there are two sloped roof dormers.	II*
The Toft; 54.09310°N 0.20697°W		1673	The house, which was refronted in the mid-19th century, is in red brick, on a brick plinth with a foot scraper, with sill bands, a moulded eaves cornice, and a pantile roof. There are three storeys and four bays. The third bay projects slightly, and contains a doorway with fluted Tuscan pilasters, a four-light rectangular fanlight, panelled reveals, and a cornice, and on the left is a doorway with a rusticated lintel. The windows are sashes with rusticated lintels and keystones, those on the middle floor with hoods on console brackets, and those on the ground floor with shutters. The interior has fine furnishings.	II*
42 and 44 High Street; 54.09323°N 0.20702°W		Late 17th century	A pair of shops incorporating re-used medieval stonework, otherwise in brick and painted, with a pantile roof. There are two storeys and attics, and two bays. The right shop has a modern shopfront with a bow window. The shopfront on the left shop dates from the late 18th century, and has two bow windows flanking a central doorway, above which are cornices decorated with Gothic arches. The upper floor contains sash windows, and there are two gabled dormers.	II*
11–15 Westgate; 54.09344°N 0.21056°W		Late 17th century	A row of three houses, originally one house, in brick on a rendered plinth, with two storeys and attics. The left house projects and is gabled. On the ground floor is a segmental shop window and a doorway to the right, the middle floor has a canted bay window, and above is a sash window with a vermiculated keystone. The middle house has a doorway with engaged fluted Tuscan columns above which is a canted bay window. The right house has a doorway with a moulded surround, elsewhere, there are sash windows, and all the doorways have rectangular fanlights.	II
Craven House; 54.09322°N 0.20543°W		Late 17th century	The house, which was remodelled in the early 19th century, is in brick on a rendered plinth, with a parapet and a pantile roof. There are two storeys and three bays. In the centre, steps lead up to a recessed doorway with reeded pilasters, fluted capitals, a decorated semicircular fanlight, a panelled soffit and reveals, a frieze, a fluted dentilled cornice, and a pediment with a lion's mask and swags in the tympanum. The windows are sashes with stucco lintels, and shutters on the ground floor. The doorway is flanked by inset foot scrapers.	II*
West End House; 54.09345°N 0.21130°W		Late 17th century	The house is rendered, on a plinth, with vermiculated rusticated quoins, sill courses, a moulded cornice and a parapet. There are three storeys and four bays. The doorway has pilasters, an entablature, a panelled soffit and jambs, and a rectangular fanlight. The windows are sashes, those in the ground floor with shaped moulded cornices, the middle floor windows have cornices with pediment shaping and shoulders, and the top floor windows with lintels and vermiculated keystones. To the right is a two-storey single-bay extension with a Welsh slate roof, a bow window on the upper floor, and a sash window in a moulded surround below.	II
45 High Street; 54.09312°N 0.20721°W		1693	A house, later used for other purposes, in brick on a plinth, with a floor bands, a moulded dentiled eaves cornice, and a pantile roof. There are two storeys and attics, and five bays. The ground floor contains an 18th-century shopfront with two bow windows flanking an entrance, a plain frieze and a dentilled cornice. To the left is a doorway with a three-light rectangular fanlight and a keystone. On the upper floor are sash windows with painted brick voussoirs and keystones, and above are two gabled dormers with horizontally sliding sashes.	II*
15–17 Kirkgate; 54.09375°N 0.20398°W		Late 17th to early 18th century	A row of three houses in brick on a stone plinth, with rusticated quoins, a floor band, and a steep pantile roof. There are two storeys and four bays. On the ground floor are three doorways with three-light rectangular fanlights, one with a moulded architrave, a pulvinated frieze and a dentilled cornice, and all with flat hoods on consoles. Between them is a passage entry with a rectangular fanlight, and the windows are sashes with painted brick heads.	II
Former Avenue Hospital; 54.09353°N 0.21232°W		1714	The house, at one time a hospital and later converted into flats, is in brick, with giant pilasters at the angles and flanking the middle bay, and a stone coped parapet. There are three storeys and five bays. In the centre is a projecting Greek Doric portico with a full entablature, containing steps leading to a doorway with side lights. The windows are sashes with moulded flying cornices. The rainwater heads have a crest and the date. At the rear are two full-height bay windows.	II*
15 High Street; 54.09311°N 0.20549°W		Early 18th century (probable)	The shop is in painted brick, with a brick eaves cornice and a pantile roof. There are two storeys and a basement, and one bay. On the ground floor is a doorway with a rectangular fanlight and a rendered lintel. To the right is a shopfront with grooved pilasters, a bow window and a fascia. The upper floor contains a rectangular bay window with sashes.	II
33 High Street; 54.09307°N 0.20641°W		Early 18th century (probable)	The house is rendered and has a pantile roof. There are two storeys and two bays. The ground floor contains a 19th-century shopfront with carved pilasters and a tiled stall riser. On the upper floor are two sash windows flanked by moulded panels.	II
36 High Street; 54.09321°N 0.20667°W		Early 18th century (or earlier)	The shop is rendered, with quoins and a pantile roof. There are two storeys and attics, and two bays. The ground floor contains a modern shopfront and a doorway to the left. On the upper floor are sash windows, between them is a sign bracket, and above is a sloped dormer.	II
51 and 53 High Street; 54.09318°N 0.20753°W		Early 18th century	The house is in painted brick, with six giant pilasters, a moulded cornice under rendered panels below the eaves, and a pantile roof. There are two storeys and seven bays. The doorway has panelled pilasters and reveals, a semicircular fanlight, a frieze and a cornice, and the windows are sashes.	II*
70 High Street; 54.09346°N 0.20854°W		Early 18th century	The shop is in painted brick, with a pantile roof, two storeys and two bays. On the ground floor is a late 18th-century shopfront, consisting of two bow windows on coved supports, flanking a doorway with a segmental fanlight containing Gothic glazing. The upper panels of the door have ornamental glazing, and the upper floor contains two sash windows with stone lintels.	II*
10 Market Place; 54.09410°N 0.21014°W		Early 18th century	The house is in brick with a pantile roof. There are two storeys and three bays. On the ground floor are three windows with painted lintels, the middle one with a fluted keystone. To the left is a doorway approached by five curved steps, with pilasters, a blocked radial fanlight and a cornice, and to the right is a flat-headed passage entry. The top floor contains a bow window with a moulded cornice, flanked by sash windows with painted rusticated lintels.	II
15 and 16 Market Place; 54.09436°N 0.21011°W	—	Early 18th century	A pair of houses in brick on a plinth, with a stepped eaves cornice and a pantile roof. There are two storeys and four bays. The outer bays contain doorways approached by steps, the left with iron rails, and the windows are sashes.	II
18 Market Place; 54.09457°N 0.21009°W		Early 18th century	The house is rendered and has a pantile roof. There are two storeys and two bays. In the centre is a doorway with a rectangular three-light fanlight, to its right is a canted bay window, and the other windows are sashes.	II
17 High Street; 54.09309°N 0.20561°W		18th century	A shop and a house, they are rendered, and have a pantile roof. There are two storeys and four bays. On the ground floor is a 19th-century shopfront, to its right is a doorway with a rectangular fanlight, and further to the right is a sash window. The upper floor contains four windows, one blocked, and the openings have rendered lintels.	II
18 and 20 High Street; 54.09322°N 0.20562°W		18th century	A pair of houses in brick, on a rendered plinth, with a floor band, a moulded eaves cornice and a pantile roof. There are two storeys and attics, and two bays. In the centre is a pair of doorways with grooved pilasters and a small cornice, and another doorway on the far right, all with rectangular fanlights. The windows are sashes, and there is a flat-roofed dormer.	II
22 High Street; 54.09321°N 0.20582°W		18th century	The building, which was remodelled in the 19th century, is in brick, the basement rendered, with a Welsh slate roof. There are two storeys and a basement, and nine bays. Steps with iron handrails lead up to the doorway that has engaged fluted Doric columns, and a small dentilled cornice. The windows, including three in the basement to the left of the doorway, are sashes with carved lintels and keystones. In the left bay is a round-arched carriage entrance with a carved stucco head and a keystone.	II*
26 High Street; 54.09319°N 0.20613°W		18th century	The house is in brown brick, with a brick eaves cornice and a pantile roof. There are two storeys and an attic, and one bay. Three steps lead up to the doorway on the left that has a rectangular fanlight. The windows are horizontally sliding sashes with painted brick voussoirs, and there is a dormer.	II
29 High Street; 54.09304°N 0.20617°W		18th century	The house, which was refronted in the early 19th century, is in painted brick on a stone plinth, with a stone coped parapet. There are three storeys and five bays. The doorway has Tuscan pilasters, an entablature, panelled reveals, and a rectangular fanlight. To the right is smaller doorway with a lintel and a keystone. The windows are sashes with rusticated lintels and keystones.	II
31 High Street; 54.09306°N 0.20630°W		18th century	The house is in painted brick, with a wooden eaves cornice and a pantile roof. There are two storeys and two bays. On the ground floor is a 19th-century shopfront. To its right and on the upper floor are sash windows with rusticated lintels and keystones.	II
34 High Street; 54.09321°N 0.20655°W		18th century	The house is in red brick on a rendered plinth, with a sill band and a wooden eaves cornice. There are two storeys and three bays. In the centre of the ground floor is a doorway with engaged Tuscan columns, a plain entablature, a semicircular fanlight, a panelled soffit and reveals, and a segmental pediment. On the far left is a round-headed passage entry, and the windows are sashes with stone lintels and keystones.	II
38 High Street; 54.09321°N 0.20675°W		18th century	The house is in red brick, with a brick eaves cornice, and a pantile roof, hipped on the left. There are two storeys and attics, and two bays. The ground floor contains a shopfront with pilasters, on the upper floor are two sash windows, and above is a sloped dormer.	II
46, 46A, 48, 50 and 50A High Street; 54.09325°N 0.20716°W		18th century	A row of buildings in brick, incorporating medieval stonework and painted, with a pantile roof. There are two storeys and attics, and four bays. On the ground floor is a 19th-century shopfront with bow windows flanking an entrance, to the left are two doorways with a small-paned bow window between, and further to the left is a modern shopfront and a passage entry. On the upper floor are sash windows, and above are three gabled dormers with horizontally sliding sashes.	II*
52 High Street; 54.09328°N 0.20740°W		18th century	The shop is in painted brick, with a Welsh slate roof and two bays. The right bay has two storeys, a large window with a segmental head on the ground floor, and above is a large rectangular bay window with a pediment containing decoration in the tympanum. The left bay has three storeys, a 19th-century shopfront and sash windows above.	II
55 and 57 High Street; 54.09325°N 0.20768°W	—	18th century	The café has modern stone on the ground floor, and above it is in painted brick with a pantile roof. There are two storeys and attics, and two bays. On the ground floor are two bow windows and two doorways. The upper floor contains two horizontally sliding sash windows with blocked elliptical reveals, and above is a large two-light dormer with elliptical reveals.	II
59 and 61 High Street; 54.09325°N 0.20780°W	—	18th century	A shop and a house in painted brick, with a brick eaves cornice and a pantile roof. There are two storeys and four bays. On the ground floor is a shopfront with pilasters, a window and a doorway, all under a continuous fascia. The upper floor contains four horizontally sliding sash windows.	II
64 High Street; 54.09341°N 0.20820°W		18th century	The house is in brick on a stone plinth, with stone dressings, rusticated quoins, a sill band, and a stone coped eaves parapet. There are three storeys and four bays. The doorway has panelled pilasters with acanthus capitals, a panelled soffit and jambs, a semicircular fanlight, a frieze with swags and medallions, a dentilled cornice and a pediment. The windows are sashes with painted brick voussoirs. Flanking the doorway are two foot scrapers.	II
66 and 68 High Street; 54.09344°N 0.20842°W		18th century	The house is in brown brick, the ground floor rendered, with a floor band, paired eaves brackets and a pantile roof. There are three storeys and two bays. In the centre of the ground floor is a doorway with a semicircular head, an ornamental fanlight and side lights. This flanked by modern windows with semicircular heads. The middle floor contains two canted bay windows, each with a modillion cornice and a panelled base, and on the top floor are two sash windows with rendered rusticated lintels.	II
72 High Street; 54.09349°N 0.20866°W		18th century	The shop is in brick with a pantile roof. There are two storeys and attics, and two bays. The ground floor contains a late 19th-century shopfront with two windows and two doorways, on the middle floor are two sash windows, and above are two sloped roof dormers.	II
79 High Street; 54.09344°N 0.20875°W		18th century	The shop is in brick, the middle floor rendered, with a floor band and a pantile roof. There are three storeys and one bay. The ground floor has a modern shopfront, on the middle floor is a canted bay window, and the top floor contains a sash window with painted voussoirs.	II
91 High Street; 54.09345°N 0.20938°W	—	18th century	The building is in painted brick, with a moulded eaves cornice and a pantile roof. There are two storeys and three bays. On the ground floor is a modern shopfront, and a narrow round-arched passage entry on the left. To the left of the shopfront and on the upper floor are sash windows with painted voussoirs.	II
94 (part) and 96 High Street; 54.09354°N 0.20954°W		18th century	A pair of shops in painted brick, with a moulded eaves cornice and a curved pantile roof. There are two storeys and attics, and two bays. On the ground floor are two 19th-century shopfronts, the upper floor contains two canted bay windows, and above are two sloped roof dormers with horizontally siding sash windows.	II
98 High Street; 54.09357°N 0.20962°W		18th century	The shop is rendered and has a pantile roof. There are two storeys and an attic, and two bays. On the ground floor is a late 19th-century shopfront, the upper floor contains two canted bay windows, and above is a sloped roof dormer.	II
1–3 Kirkgate; 54.09335°N 0.20477°W		18th century	The building is in brick, with a modillion eaves cornice, and a tile roof with tumbled brick in the gable ends. There are three storeys and three bays. The ground floor contains a modern shopfront and a window to the right. The windows are sashes with rusticated lintels and keystones.	II
4 and 5 Kirkgate; 54.09341°N 0.20461°W		18th century	The building is rendered and has a pantile roof. There are two storeys and three bays. On the ground floor is a mid to late 19th-century shopfront, a passage door to the left and to the right is a doorway with a rectangular fanlight and a window. The windows are sashes with painted lintels.	II
6 Kirkgate; 54.09350°N 0.20443°W		18th century	The house is in brick with a pantile roof. There are two storeys and two bays. On the front are tripartite sash windows with lintels.	II
12 and 13 Market Place; 54.09416°N 0.21014°W		18th century	A pair of rendered houses with a pantile roof. There are three storeys and two bays. On the front are two doorways with plain surrounds, the right with a narrow rectangular fanlight, and the windows are sashes.	II
14 Market Place; 54.09424°N 0.21012°W		18th century (probable)	The shop is in brick with a Welsh slate roof. There are two storeys and three bays. The ground floor contains a shopfront and a window to the right, and on the upper floor are three sash windows. All the windows have segmental-arched heads.	II
17 Market Place; 54.09446°N 0.21010°W	—	18th century	The building is rendered, and has rusticated quoins and a pantile roof. There are two storeys and three bays. In the centre is a Tuscan portico, with an entablature extending over a doorway and a rectangular bay window on the right. To the left is a two-storey canted bay window. Above the porch is a sash window, and to its right is a canted bay window.	II
19–21 Market Place; 54.09470°N 0.21009°W	—	18th century	A row of three cottages in brick with a pantile roof. There is one storey and attics, and three bays. The doorways have plain surrounds, and the windows are horizontally sliding sashes, those in the attics in sloped dormers.	II
23A Market Place; 54.09498°N 0.21012°W	—	18th century	The house is in painted brick, with quoins on the right, a pantile roof, hipped on the right, and two storeys. To the left are two modern doors, between which is a modern four-light casement window, and on the upper floor are two sash windows. To the right is a segmental-headed openings, and at the rear are farm buildings with an elliptical carriage entry.	II
44 Market Place; 54.09380°N 0.20973°W		18th century	The house is in brick with a steep pantile roof. There are two storeys and two bays. The doorway has a decorated rectangular fanlight, the windows are sashes, and all the openings have painted voussoirs.	II
45 Market Place; 54.09371°N 0.20971°W		18th century	The house is rendered, on a plinth, and has rusticated quoins, sill bands, and a Welsh slate roof. There are two storeys and five bays. The doorway has pilasters, an entablature and a rectangular fanlight, and the windows are sashes, those on the ground floor with lintels.	II
14 Westgate; 54.09362°N 0.21134°W		18th century	The house is in rendered brick, with vermiculated rusticated quoins on the right, an eaves cornice and a pantile roof. There are two storeys and two bays. The doorway on the left bay has a blocked rectangular fanlight and to its left is a passage doorway, and the windows are sashes. The ground floor windows and the main doorway have cornice lintels with vermiculated keystones.	II
16 Westgate; 54.09364°N 0.21148°W		18th century	The house is rendered, and has vermiculated rusticated quoins, an eaves cornice and a pantile roof with coped gables. The central doorway has a rectangular fanlight, and the windows are sashes. The doorway and the ground floor windows have cornice lintels with vermiculated keystones.	II
25 Westgate; 54.09348°N 0.21134°W		18th century	The house is in brick, with a dentilled brick eaves cornice and a pantile roof. There are two storeys and three bays. On the left is a doorway with a pediment, and on the right is a flat-headed carriage entrance. Elsewhere, there are sash windows.	II
27 Westgate; 54.09349°N 0.21142°W		18th century	The house is in brick, with paired eaves brackets and a pantile roof. There are two storeys and attics, and two bays. On the right is a doorway with a three-light rectangular fanlight, and the windows are sashes; all the openings have lintels. On the roof is a sloped dormer.	II
Black Lion Public House; 54.09341°N 0.20962°W		18th century	The public house is rendered and painted, and has a Welsh slate roof. There are two storeys and an L-shaped plan, with a main range of two bays, and a projecting gabled cross-wing on the right. In the centre of the main block is a porch with columns, a frieze and a hood, and there is a doorway on the wing. To the left of the porch and on the front of the wing are canted bay windows, and the other windows are sashes.	II
The Pack Horse Public House; 54.09386°N 0.21008°W		18th century	The public house has a plinth, a pantile roof and three bays. The left bay is in painted brick, with two storeys and a flat carriage entry, and above is a sash window under a segmental arch. The other two bays are of the same height and rendered, with three storeys. They have rusticated stone quoins, and an eaves cornice on paired brackets, and contain sash windows, paired on the ground floor, and with lintels and keystones on the lower two floors.	II
The Queens Public House; 54.09334°N 0.20870°W		18th century	The public house is in painted brick, with a moulded eaves cornice. There are three storeys and four bays. On the ground floor is a modern public house front. Above, on the right bay, is a two-storey canted bay window. The other windows are sashes with rusticated lintels and keystones.	II
Windsor House and outbuilding 54.09433°N 0.20470°W	—	18th century	The house is in brick, rendered on the front, with a pantile roof. There is one storey and attics, and two bays. The central doorway has a rectangular fanlight. It is flanked by sash windows, and all the openings have rendered lintels with incised keystones. Above are two sloped dormers, and to the left is an outbuilding containing a carriage entry.	II
8 Market Place; 54.09397°N 0.21012°W		Late 18th century	The shop is in painted brick with a pantile roof. There are three storeys and two bays. On the ground floor is a modern bow window, and to the right are paired doorways with moulded surrounds. The upper floors contain modern casement windows.	II
38 Market Place; 54.09415°N 0.20970°W		Late 18th century	The house is in painted brick, with a modillion eaves cornice and a pantile roof. There are two storeys and a cellar, and two bays. The right bay contains a two-storey bow window with sashes, and a lintel with a fluted keystone. On the left, steps with iron handrails lead up to a doorway with fluted pilasters, panelled jambs, a semicircular fanlight and an open pediment.	II
Coverley House; 54.09486°N 0.21007°W		Late 18th century	The house is in brick on a plinth, with rusticated stone quoins, a modillion eaves cornice, and a pantile roof. There are three storeys and three bays. In the centre is a Tuscan portico, with a frieze and a modillion cornice, and a doorway that has fluted pilasters with capitals, a semicircular fanlight, a panelled soffit and jambs, and a frieze. The windows are sashes, those on the lower two floors with painted lintels.	II
Levisham House; 54.09477°N 0.20969°W	—	Late 18th century	The house is in brick, with a bracketed eaves cornice and a pantile roof. There are two storeys and two bays. The central doorway has reeded pilasters, a panelled soffit and jambs, a semicircular fanlight, a frieze, a fluted dentilled cornice, and a pediment. The windows are sashes with painted rusticated lintels.	II
76–82 High Street; 54.09351°N 0.20888°W		Late 18th or early 19th century	A public house and two shops in brick, the public house painted, with a moulded eaves cornice and a pantile roof. There are three storeys and six bays. On the ground floor is a public house front on the left, and two shopfronts on the right. The upper floors contain sash windows with painted lintels.	II
81 High Street; 54.09345°N 0.20881°W		Late 18th or early 19th century	The shop is in brick, and has a pantile roof with stone coped gables and kneelers. There are three storeys and one bay. The ground floor has a 19th-century shopfront and a modern door, and above is a two-storey canted bay window.	II
84 and 86 High Street; 54.09355°N 0.20915°W		Late 18th or early 19th century	A pair of shops in brick, with a pantile roof. There are three storeys and three bays. On the ground floor are two shopfronts, and a passage entry to the left. The middle bay of the upper floor contains a blind two-storey window recess with a stone pediment on brackets, and the other bays contain two-light sash windows with painted lintels.	II
85 and 87 High Street; 54.09340°N 0.20913°W		Late 18th or early 19th century	A pair of shops in brick, with a pantile roof, three storeys and three bays. The ground floor contains two early 19th-century segmental shopfronts, and a passage entry to the right. On the upper floors are sash windows with rusticated lintels.	II
89 High Street; 54.09345°N 0.20927°W	—	18th or early 19th century	The shop is in painted brick with a pantile roof. There are two storeys and one bay. The ground floor contains a late 19th-century shopfront, and on the upper floor is a rectangular bay window.	II
9 Kirkgate; 54.09355°N 0.20436°W		18th to early 19th century	The house is rendered on the front, and has a pantile roof. There are two storeys and two bays. On the left is a doorway with a rectangular fanlight, and a foot scraper to its right. The windows are sashes, those on the right bay tripartite, and they have lintels.	II
1 Market Place; 54.09361°N 0.21011°W		Late 18th to early 19th century	The shop is in brick, and has a pantile roof with coped gables. There are three storeys and two bays. The ground floor contains two bow windows flanking a central doorway with divided fanlight, and on the upper floors are sash windows with rusticated lintels.	II
25 Pinfold Street; 54.09556°N 0.20318°W		18th or early 19th century	The house is in rendered brick with a pantile roof. It is a long building with one storey and attics. On the front are a doorway and sash windows, and above are three sloped half-dormers with horizontally sliding sashes.	II
Stable block, former Avenue Hospital; 54.09349°N 0.21287°W		c. 1820	The stable block, later converted for residential use, is in brick on a stone plinth, with stone sill and eaves bands, a cornice on consoles, and a hipped slate roof. There are two storeys and an archway, with five bays on the left and three on the right. The round-headed archway is in rusticated and vermiculated stone, with a keystone and a pediment. The windows are sashes, those on the ground floor with rusticated lintels. On the far left is a round-arched doorway with a rusticated surround, a semicircular fanlight and a keystone.	II
20–22 Church Green and coach house 54.09329°N 0.20292°W		Early 19th century	A row of three houses in brick with a Welsh slate roof. There are three storeys and six bays. Each house has a doorway on the left bay with pilasters, panelled reveals, a three-light fanlight and a cornice. The windows are sashes with stucco rusticated lintels. To the left is a former single-storey coach house with a rusticated carriage entry.	II
19, 19A, 21, 23 and 23A High Street; 54.09308°N 0.20578°W		Early 19th century	A row of houses in brick, partly painted, with a pantile roof. There are two storeys and five bays. The ground floor contains pilasters, doorways with fanlights, tripartite windows and a modern window. On the upper floor are three canted bay windows and two sash windows.	II
40 High Street; 54.09321°N 0.20688°W		Early 19th century	A house and a shop in brick, with a sill band, eaves on paired brackets, and a pantile roof. There are three storeys and two bays. On the left of the ground floor is a doorway, and to the right is a shopfront, both with pilasters and dentilled cornices, and between them is a sash window. The upper floor contains sash windows and all the windows have carved lintels with keystones.	II
47 and 49 High Street; 54.09315°N 0.20733°W	—	Early 19th century	The shop is in red brick, with sill bands and a pantile roof. There are three storeys and four bays. The ground floor contains shopfronts with pilasters, and on the upper floors are sash windows with stone carved lintels and keystones.	II
63 and 65 High Street; 54.09328°N 0.20797°W		Early 19th century	The houses have an early 19th-century front on older buildings. They are in red brick, with sill bands, a moulded stucco cornice and a parapet. There are three storeys and three bays. In the centre is a passage leading to two doorways with attached Tuscan columns in the angles. To the left is a three-light window with a rusticated lintel and to the right is a modern window. The upper floors contain sash windows with rusticated lintels. At the rear of the right house is a three-storey bow window.	II
67 High Street; 54.09326°N 0.20809°W		Early 19th century	The shop is in brick, with three storeys and two bays. On the ground floor is a large projecting bay window with rounded angle glazing and delicate glazing bars of painted brass, and to the right is a doorway. The middle floor contains two semicircular bow windows, and on the top floor are two sash windows.	II*
69 High Street; 54.09328°N 0.20822°W	—	Early 19th century	The shop on a corner site is in red brick, with three storeys and a front of two bays. On the ground floor are shopfronts, the middle floor contains two canted bay windows, and on the top floor are two sash windows.	II
73 High Street and 2 and 4 Gordon Road; 54.09329°N 0.20854°W		Early 19th century	The building, on a corner side, is in red brick, the ground floor and left return rendered, with a moulded eaves cornice. There are three storeys, two bays on the front and one on the left return. The ground floor contains a late 19th-century shopfront with the doorway on the corner. On the upper floors are sash windows with rusticated lintels. The rear wing forms 2 and 4 Gordon Road. It is rendered, and has three storeys and three bays, two doorways and varied windows.	II
83 High Street; 54.09345°N 0.20902°W		Early 19th century	The shop is in painted brick, with paired eaves brackets and a pantile roof. There are three storeys and two bays. On the ground floor is an early 19th-century shopfront with moulded pilasters and a narrow fascia, and to the right is a round-arched passage entry. The upper floors contain sash windows with lintels.	II
88 and 90 High Street; 54.09355°N 0.20930°W		Early 19th century	The shop is in brick, with a pantile roof, three storeys and two bays. On the ground floor are two shopfronts, and the upper floors contain sash windows with rendered lintels.	II
22 Market Place; 54.09478°N 0.21006°W	—	Early 19th century	The house is in yellow brick, with a dentilled eaves cornice and a pantile roof. There are two storeys and three bays. The central doorway has moulded pilasters, a rectangular fanlight and a cornice. The windows are sashes with painted brick voussoirs.	II
26 Market Place; 54.09490°N 0.20970°W	—	Early 19th century	The house is in yellow brick, with brick pilasters, and a Welsh slate roof. There are two storeys and three bays, the middle bay recessed, and the upper floor with channelled stucco. Steps with cast iron handrails lead up to the central doorway that has a moulded surround, a rectangular fanlight, a cornice, and a flat hood on brackets. The windows are sashes with rusticated lintels and keystones.	II
13 Pinfold Street; 54.09504°N 0.20317°W	—	Early 19th century	The house is in brick, with a brick eaves cornice and a Welsh slate roof. There are two storeys and three bays. Steps with iron handrails lead up to the central doorway with a three-light rectangular fanlight, and to the right is a round-headed passage entry. The windows are sashes with painted lintels.	II
15 Pinfold Street; 54.09514°N 0.20317°W		Early 19th century	The house is in brick, with a dentilled eaves cornice and a Welsh slate roof. There are two storeys and three bays. The central doorway has been blocked, and there is a round-arched doorway on the left. The windows are sashes with lintels and keystones.	II
25 South Back Lane; 54.09242°N 0.20551°W	—	Early 19th century	The building is in yellow brick with a hipped Welsh slate roof. There is one storey and one bay. On the front is a doorway with a blocked rectangular fanlight, and to the right is a sash window with brick voussoirs.	II
27 South Back Lane; 54.09233°N 0.20568°W		Early 19th century	The house is in yellow brick, with end pilasters and a hipped Welsh slate roof. There are three storeys and three bays. In the centre is a Doric doorway with engaged fluted columns and a rectangular fanlight. The windows are sashes with carved stone lintels and keystones. Attached to the house are curved garfden walls.	II
33 South Back Lane; 54.09233°N 0.20666°W		Early 19th century	The house is rendered, on a plinth, with rusticated quoins, and a hipped Welsh slate roof. There are two storeys and four bays. On the front are two doorways with rectangular fanlights, and sash windows, all with rusticated lintels.	II
31 Westgate; 54.09350°N 0.21187°W		Early 19th century	The house is in rendered brick on a plinth, with vermiculated rusticated quoins, a parapet and a Welsh slate roof. There are two storeys and three bays. Steps lead up to the central round-headed doorway that has reeded pilasters with animal mask capitals, jambs with fielded panels, an ornamental semicircular fanlight, and a frieze with a vine and grapes in relief. The outer bays contain two-storey canted bay windows, and above the doorway is a sash window with a pedimented architrave.	II
Garden wall to west of the former Avenue Hospital; 54.09347°N 0.21392°W		Early 19th century (probable)	The wall extending along the south side of Westgate is in brick with coping, and it contains rusticated gate piers.	II
Regency House; 54.09396°N 0.21010°W		Early 19th century	The house is rendered, and has a pantile roof with coped gables. There are three storeys and one bay. The doorway on the left has panelled pilasters, panelled reveals, a rectangular fanlight, and a flat cornice. To the right is a two-storey canted bay window, and on the top floor is a sash window.	II
The Gables; 54.09332°N 0.20772°W		Early 19th century	The house is in brick on a plinth with a parapet. There are three storeys and two bays. The doorway on the left bay has engaged fluted Tuscan columns, an entablature, and a rectangular fanlight with four round-arched lights. The windows are sashes with rusticated lintels and keystones.	II
Carpet warehouse 54.09420°N 0.20537°W		1829	Originally the National School for Boys, and later used for other purposes, the building is in brown brick, and has one storey. It consists of a central block with a Welsh slate roof, and flanking wings with hipped pantile roofs and lion's mask guttering. On each wing is a casement window with a rendered lintel, and the central block has smaller windows with wooden lintels, and a doorway.	II
15–18 Church Green; 54.09371°N 0.20223°W		Early to mid-19th century	A terrace of four houses in painted brick, one with a Welsh slate roof, the others with pantiles. There are two storeys and attics, and eight bays. Each house has a doorway on the left with a rectangular fanlight, sash windows and a gabled roof dormer.	II
24 High Street; 54.09319°N 0.20606°W		Early to mid-19th century	The house is in red brick on a plinth, with sill bands, and a wooden eaves cornice. There are three storeys and three bays. The doorway in the right bay has pilasters, an entablature, panelled reveals, a rectangular fanlight and a cornice. On the far left is a doorway with a stone round head and a keystone. The windows are sashes with carved stone lintels and keystones.	II
32 High Street; 54.09323°N 0.20640°W		Early to mid-19th century	The house is in red brick on a plinth, with floor and sill bands, and a modillion eaves cornice. There are three storeys and three bays. Above the ground floor is a projecting moulded cornice carried on three grooved columns from a former shopfront and two brackets. On the left is a doorway with a moulded surround, a rectangular fanlight and a rusticated lintel. To its right is a two-light sash window under an ornamental iron frieze, and a round-headed passage entry. The outer bays of the middle floor contain canted bay windows, and the other windows are sashes with rusticated lintels and keystones.	II
64A High Street; 54.09342°N 0.20832°W		Early to mid-19th century	The shop is in red brick, with a sill band, and a yellow brick eaves cornice. There are three storeys and two bays. On the ground floor is a 19th-century shopfront with pseudo-Ionic pilasters, and a passage entry to the left. The upper floors contain sash windows with painted voussoirs.	II
74 High Street; 54.09349°N 0.20866°W		Early to mid-19th century	The shop is in painted brick, with paired eaves brackets and a pantile roof. There are three storeys and two bays. The ground floor contains a shopfront, and on the upper floors are sash windows with brick voussoirs.	II
20 Westgate; 54.09368°N 0.21180°W		Early to mid-19th century	The house is in yellow brick on a plinth, with a floor and a sill band, a stone eaves band, and a hipped pantile roof. There are two storeys and two bays. The doorway on the right has panelled reveals, and to its right is a foot scraper. The windows are sashes; the ground floor window is tripartite.	II
22 Westgate; 54.09371°N 0.21194°W		Early to mid-19th century	The house is in red brick on a plinth, with yellow brick dressings, a dentilled cornice on the left return and a slate roof. There are two storeys and two bays. The left bay projects and is gabled, with end pilasters in yellow brick. The windows are casements, on the ground floor with a flat head and a cornice, and on the upper floor with a round-arched head. The right bay contains a projecting porch on the left and round-arched windows.	II
54 High Street; 54.09330°N 0.20752°W		Mid-19th century	The shop is rendered and painted, and has rusticated quoins, three storeys and three bays. The ground floor contains a shopfront with plain pilasters, and to the left is a passage entry. On the upper floors are sash windows with moulded surrounds, those on the middle floor with pediments on brackets.	II
56 High Street; 54.09332°N 0.20763°W		Mid-19th century	The building is in red brick, with three storeys and two bays. On the ground floor is a shopfront with narrow pilasters, a fascia and a cornice, and to the left is a passage entry. The middle floor contains two canted bay windows, and on the top floor are two sash windows with carved painted lintels and keystones.	II
2 Marton Road; 54.09516°N 0.20829°W		Mid-19th century	The house is in yellow brick, with a Welsh slate roof and carved bargeboards to the gable ends. There are two storeys and three bays. On the front is a porch with columns and an entablature. The windows are sashes with rusticated lintels. At the rear is a round-arched stair window, and a doorway with columns, an entablature, a rectangular fanlight and a cornice.	II
Burlington House; 54.09634°N 0.20582°W		Mid-19th century	The remaining buildings of a workhouse, they consist of two single-storey blocks in yellow brick with hipped Welsh slate roofs. At the ends are brick pilasters, the windows are sashes, and the left building has a rear wing on the right containing a doorway.	II
100 High Street and 46 Market Place; 54.09356°N 0.20971°W		Late 19th century	A shop and a house on a corner site in red brick, with dressings in stone and yellow brick, sill bands, a cornice, a parapet, and a Welsh slate roof. There are three storeys and attics, two bays on High Street and three on Market Place. The High Street front and the right two bays on Market Place have a shopfront with carved pilasters and capitals, and a doorway on the corner. The upper floors contain windows with moulded heads, impost bands, and carved keystones. The left bay on Market Place has a doorway with a fanlight and a three-light window to the right, both under arches with voussoirs in vitrified and yellow brick. The middle floor has a four-light window with a flat head and similar voussoirs, and on the top floor are four round-headed windows with yellow brick heads.	II
Cemetery Chapels; 54.09560°N 0.19400°W		1879	The cemetery chapels, designed by Alfred Smith, are in stone with Welsh slate roofs. They consist of a central tall steeple joined by arcades of three round arches to the chapels, which have apsidal ends. The arcade arches have carved capitals, and are lined with polychrome brickwork. The steeple consists of a tower, on which is an octagonal lantern and a spire. There is a plaque with the date and a carved angel, the ribs of the tower have carved angels, and there are numerous gargoyles.	II
Cemetery Lodge; 54.09616°N 0.19466°W		c. 1880	The cemetery lodge was designed by Alfred Smith in Gothic style. It is in polychromic brick on a plinth, with stone dressings, and a slate roof with finials on the gables. There are two storeys and an irregular plan, and the building has bands of yellow, red and vitrified brick, and some chequerwork. The porch, in an angle, has columns with foliated capitals, and a hipped roof with an iron finial.	II
Wall to Cemetery and Lodge; 54.09624°N 0.19368°W	—	c. 1880	The wall extending along the south side of Sewerby Road is in red brick. It contains piers in yellow brick with gabled stone tops, and iron railings and gates.	II
Sandwith Memorial Drinking Fountain; 54.09343°N 0.21484°W		1883	The drinking fountain commemorates Humphry Sandwith, a military medical officer. It is in Cornish granite with panels in Indian black and Norwegian blue-pearly granite. It consists of a kidney-shaped horse trough, two overflow dog troughs, a memorial pedestal, and a hand basin at the rear, and there is a lead feed pipe. The pedestal has a round arch and contains an inscribed panel.	II
Burlington Methodist Church; 54.09096°N 0.20338°W		1884	The church is in pale brick with stone dressings, and sill and floor bands, and is in Italianate style. There are two storeys and five bays, the outer bays flanked by channelled rusticated pilasters. In the centre are two doorways with carved pilasters, semicircular fanlights and pediments. The windows on the outer bays and upper floor have stone segmental heads, carved keystones and aprons. At the top is a central pediment containing a stone ornament, flanked by turrets with domed roofs and iron finials.	II
Memorial Drinking Fountain; 54.09332°N 0.20439°W		1912	The drinking fountain at the junction of Kirkgate and Baylegate is in stone. It consists of a bust of John Sawdon, a previous mayor, on a tapering plinth, with a dentilled cornice and a pediment, with scrolled supports, and has various inscriptions. The plinth stands on two steps, and a base that contains a basin, above which is a lion's mask spout. The memorial is enclosed by wrought iron railings with fleur de lys finials.	II
Telephone kiosk 54.09444°N 0.20979°W	—	1935	The telephone kiosk outside 29 Market Place is of the K6 type designed by Giles Gilbert Scott. Constructed in cast iron with a square plan and a dome, it has three unperforated crowns in the top panels.	II

== See also ==
- Listed buildings in Bridlington (Quay area)
- Listed buildings in Bridlington (Sewerby and Marton)
