= Robert of Bridlington =

12th-century English monk and theologian

Robert of Bridlington (or Robert the Scribe) was an English clergyman and theologian who was the fourth prior of Bridlington Priory. He held the office during the period from 1147 to 1156, but it is not clear if he died in office or resigned before his death. Besides holding monastic office, he wrote a number of commentaries on biblical books as well as other treatises. Not all of his works have survived to the current day.

== Life ==
Robert was an Augustinian canon at Bridlington Priory. He held the office of prior, the fourth to hold that position. He occurs as prior in documents dating to sometime between 1147 and 1156. He was out of office by 1159, and may have resigned rather than dying in office. The historian Richard Sharpe gives his death date as after 1154. The sixteenth-century antiquary John Leland recorded that Robert was buried in the cloister of the priory near the doors of the chapter house. According to Leland the inscription on his monument read Robertus cognomento Scriba quartus prior ("Robert surnamed Scribe fourth prior"). Leland saw copies of his works in the priory library, and his alternate name "the Scribe" arose from the number of writings that he authored.

== Works ==
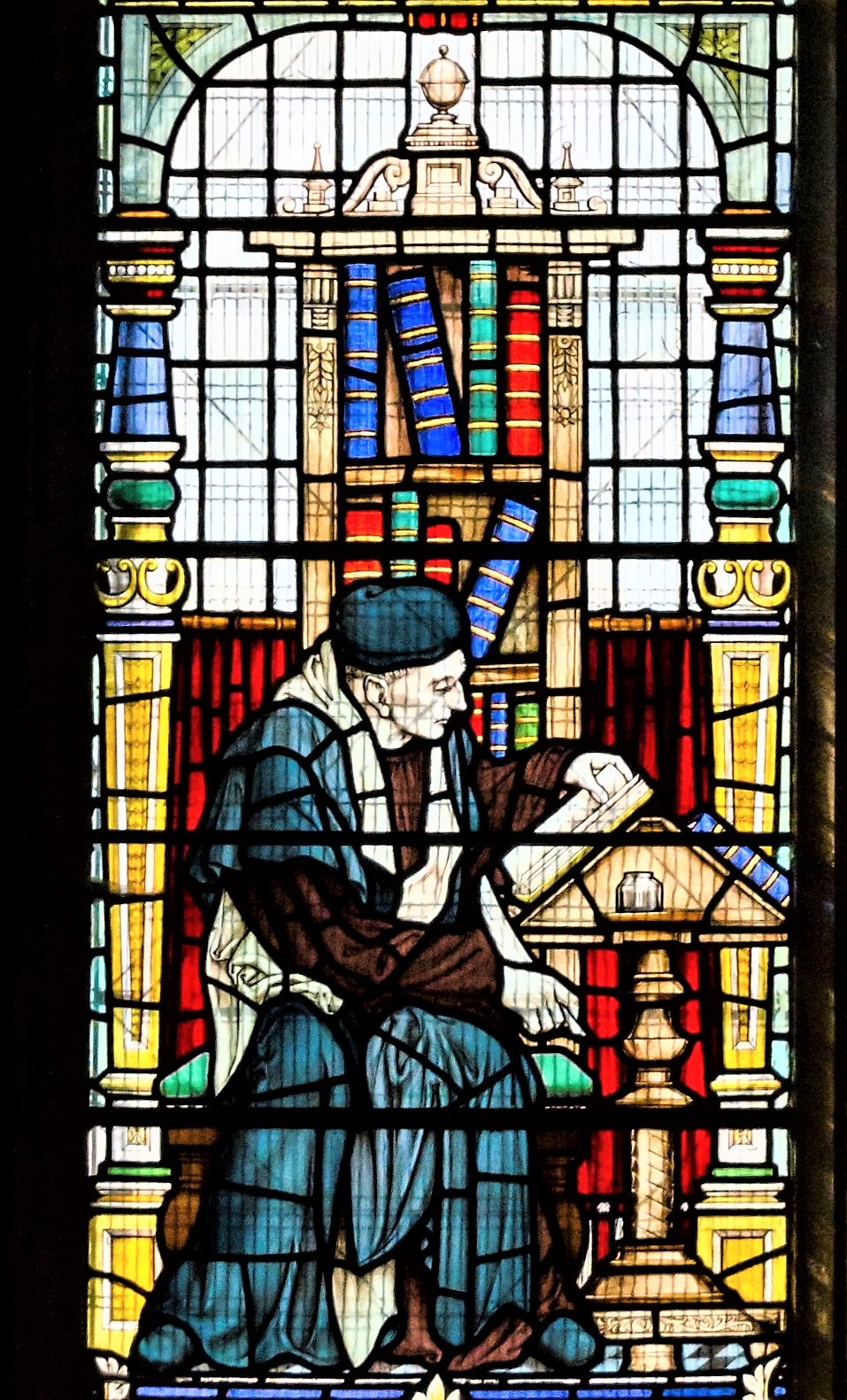
Stained glass window depicting Robert, made in 1950

Robert wrote a number of works of biblical commentary, some of which survive and some which are not extant. He is occasionally confused with another contemporary author who was Augustinian canon – Robert of Cricklade, who was prior of St Frideswide's Priory in Oxfordshire. Robert of Bridlington's surviving works include a commentary on the Book of Exodus, which survives in two manuscripts, (Note: These are held by the British Library (MS Royal 3 B.iv) and the University of Oxford (Trinity College MS 70). Three other copies are attested by authors but are not known to have survived.) a commentary on the minor prophets, surviving in three copies, (Note: The Royal Library of Belgium in Brussels holds one of these (MS II 922), with the other two held by Oxford (St John's College MS 46) and the Bibliotheque municipale in Troyes (MS 224). Five other manuscripts are attested but have not survived.) a commentary on the Pauline Epistles in two extant copies, (Note: Both held at the University of Cambridge – one at the Library (MS Dd 8 14) and the other at Emmanuel College (MS 8). Various writers saw five other manuscripts that did not survive.) and a commentary on the visions in the Book of Revelation, surviving in two manuscripts. (Note: Held by at the University of Oxford in the Bodleian Library (MS Bodley 864) and at Troyes' Bibliotheque municipale (MS 563). Three other manuscripts that did not survive are known.) The work on Revelation may have been by Robert of Cricklade. The work on the prophets was dedicated to Gervase of Louth, a Cistercian monk and writer. None of these works have been published as of 2001.

Robert's works that do not survive include a commentary on the Book of Genesis, one on the Book of Leviticus, a commentary on the Book of Numbers, a treatise on the Book of Deuteronomy, a commentary on the Gospel of Matthew, a work on the Gospel of John, a work entitled De corpore et sanguine Domini, and a treatise entitled De ecclesia catholica. Robert is known to have written a commentary on the Book of Psalms, which may be the same as a work at Syon known as "Bridlyinton super Psalterium" (MS F.20). This may be the same work as two other manuscripts – one held in the British Library (MS Royal 3 B.xi) and the other at the Durham University in the Library. (MS CosinV.V. 19) – but these are not definitively ascribed to Robert. A work titled Dialogus in regulam S. Augustini has been published as The Bridlington Dialogue and ascribed to Robert, but further research by M. L. Colker has argued that this work can be dated to after Robert's lifetime and thus is not by Robert. A work on the Lord's Prayer is often ascribed to Robert, but this rests entirely on the witness of John Bale in the sixteenth century and is not considered to be correct. J. C. Dickinson concurred with Colker's conclusions, arguing that the Robert's works show contacts with continental scholarship that is lacking in the Dialogus.

The historian Beryl Smalley considered Robert to be a compiler as an author, and that he worked within a conservative framework for his scholarship.
