= Catherine Dammartin =

Former nun buried with St Frideswide

Catherine Dammartin (died 15 February 1553) was a nun in Metz who left her convent, adopted evangelical views, and married Peter Martyr Vermigli. She is buried with Frideswide, the patron saint of Oxford.

== Life ==
Catherine lived for her early adult life as a nun in Metz. After the ideas of Protestant reformers began to circulate in the region, she left the convent and moved to Strasburg, where evangelical ideas were popular.

She married Peter Martyr in 1545. When he was appointed the first canon of Christ Church, Oxford on 20 January 1551, local residents did not welcome his married status. All previous canons had lived single, celibate lives; Peter and Catherine proved to be a rare exception to this rule until modern times. The windows of their lodgings on Fish Street were repeatedly broken. Subsequently, they moved to a study within the cloisters of Christ Church, later demolished in March 1684. They both caught a serious disease from which Peter recovered but Catherine died. She was initially buried in the cathedral at Oxford, near the tomb of St Frideswide.

George Abbot described her as "reasonably corpulent, but of most matronlike modesty", and skilled in cutting "plumstones into curious faces".

== Exhumation and reburial ==
In 1557 a commission against heresy, headed by James Brooks, sought evidence of her heresy, with a view to burning her body; none was obtained, as the persons examined 'did not understand her language'. Reginald Pole sent an order to Richard Marshall, dean of Christ Church, for the disinterment of the body, as it lay near that of the saint. Marshall transferred the corpse to a dungheap in his stable.

In 1558 an ecclesiastical commission deputed James Calfhill to superintend the reinterment. The remains were identified, and, purposely mingled with supposed relics of Frideswide, were buried at the northeast end of the cathedral, after an oration ending 'hic requiescit religio cum superstitione'.

Elizabeth Goudge's 1938 historical novel, Towers in the Mist (Gerald Duckworth, London, 1938) describes this disinterment and eventual reburial comingled with the remains of St Frideswide in Chapter 8 "Sunday", Part 2. Goudge's novel is set in Oxford during 1565 and 1566, culminating in the first visit to Oxford by Queen Elizabeth I.
