= St John's Burlington Methodist Church =

Church in Bridlington, East Riding of Yorkshire, England

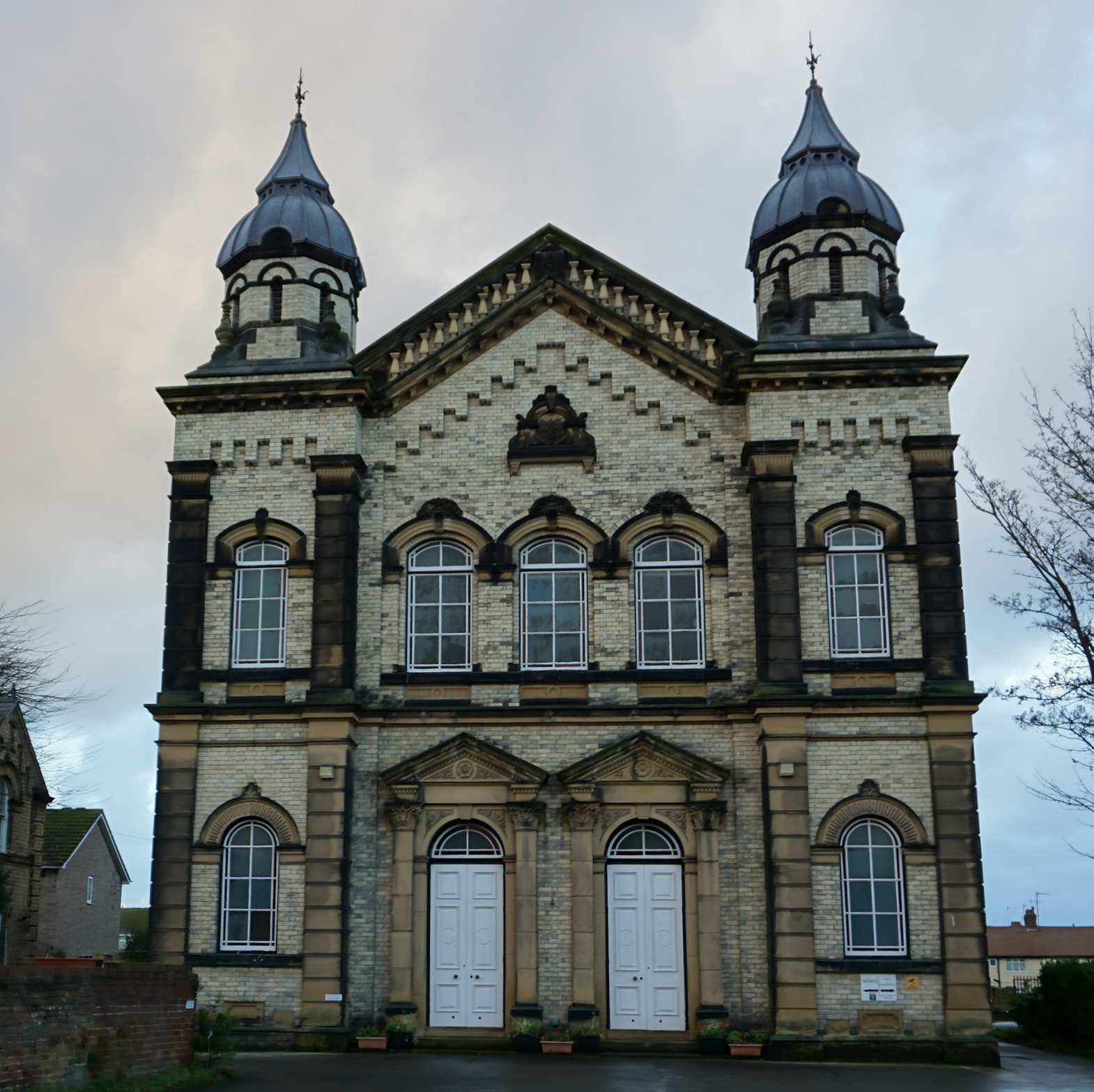
The church, in 2017

St John's Burlington Methodist Church is a historic church in Bridlington, a town in the East Riding of Yorkshire, in England.

A Methodist chapel was built in Bridlington in 1775. By the late 19th century, it was considered too small for the congregation. In 1884, a new church was built on the site, at a cost of £4,000. It was designed by Joseph Earnshaw, in the Italianate style. Nikolaus Pevsner describes it as "the most eccentric chapel in the East Riding". An organ was installed in 1893, then in 1906 there was an extension including a kitchen, toilets and a parlour. The church was grade II listed in 1976. It was restored and reorganised in 2006, and the organ was restored in 2026.

The church is built of pale brick with stone dressings, and sill and floor bands. It has two storeys and is five bays wide, the outer bays flanked by channelled rusticated pilasters. In the centre are two doorways with carved pilasters, semicircular fanlights and pediments. The windows on the outer bays and upper floor have stone segmental heads, carved keystones and aprons. At the top is a central pediment containing a stone ornament, flanked by turrets with domed roofs and iron finials.

== See also ==
- Listed buildings in Bridlington (Old Town area)
