= Black Lion, Bridlington =

Pub in Bridlington, East Riding of Yorkshire, England

Coordinates: 54°05′36″N 0°12′34″W

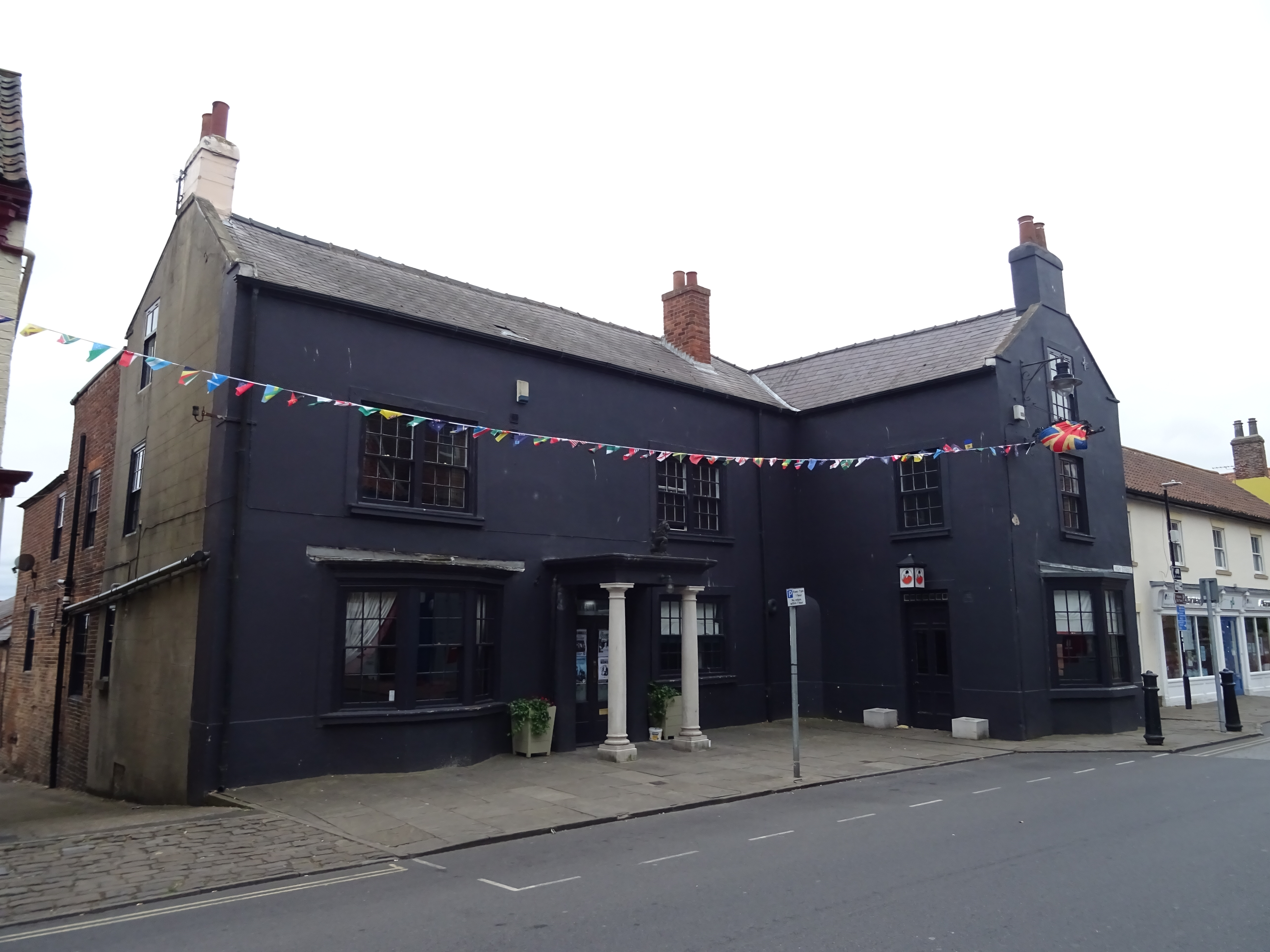
The pub, in 2022

The Black Lion is a historic pub in Bridlington, a town in the East Riding of Yorkshire, in England.

The building was constructed on the south side of the High Street in Bridlington's Old Town, in the 18th century. It was already a pub by the 1790s, and had stabling for 40 horses. During the late 19th and early 20th century, it hosted a weekly corn exchange. During the filming of the 2016 Dad's Army film, it was featured as the "Royal Oak". In the early 2020s, it was refurbished to provide, in addition to the bar, a music venue with pews moved from elsewhere. The pub has been grade II listed since 1976.

The public house is rendered and painted, and has a Welsh slate roof. There are two storeys and an L-shaped plan, with a main range of two bays, and a projecting gabled cross-wing on the right. In the centre of the main block is a porch with columns, a frieze and a hood, and there is a doorway on the wing. To the left of the porch and on the front of the wing are canted bay windows, and the other windows are sashes.

== See also ==
- Listed buildings in Bridlington (Old Town area)
