= The Toft =

House in Bridlington, East Riding of Yorkshire, England

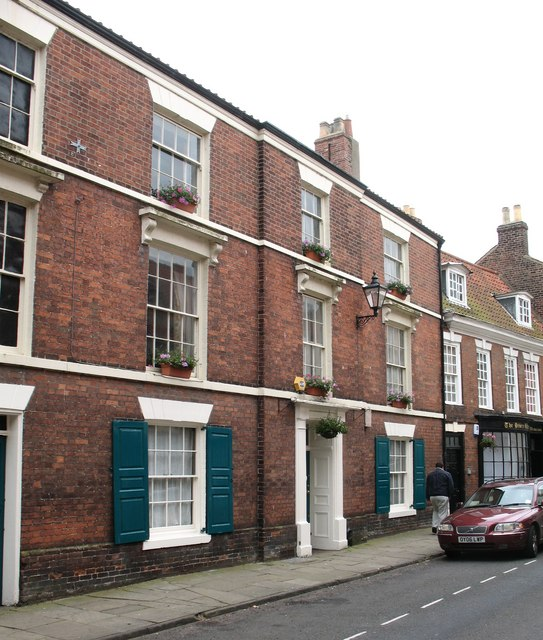
The building, in 2008

The Toft is a historic building in Bridlington, a town in the East Riding of Yorkshire, in England.

The house lies on the south side of the High Street in Bridlington. It was constructed in 1673, for William Hudson. The front was rebuilt around 1840, and an extra storey was added to the house. In the 1930s, architect Francis Johnson persuaded his parents to purchase the house. The building was grade II* listed in 1951. In 2001, it was purchased by Penelope and Frank Weston. David Neave described it as "one of the best historic houses in the East Riding".

The house is built of red brick, on a brick plinth with a foot scraper, with sill bands, a moulded eaves cornice, and a pantile roof. It has three storeys and is four bays wide. The third bay projects slightly, and contains a doorway with fluted Tuscan pilasters, a four-light rectangular fanlight, panelled reveals, and a cornice, and on the left is a doorway with a rusticated lintel. The windows are sashes with rusticated lintels and keystones, those on the middle floor with hoods on console brackets, and those on the ground floor with shutters. The interior has fine fixtures and fittings of the 17th century, including the original staircase and much woodwork.

== See also ==
- Grade II* listed buildings in the East Riding of Yorkshire
- Listed buildings in Bridlington (Old Town area)
