= Arthur Charles Edwards =

British organist and composer

Arthur Charles Edwards FRCO (1869 – 1940) was an organist and composer based in England.

== Life ==
He was born in 1869 in Peterborough, the son of Amos Edwards, Bookseller, and Sarah Elizabeth. He was educated at King's School, Peterborough. He trained under Hugh Brooksbank at Llandaff Cathedral, and also at Southwark Cathedral.

He was awarded Mus Bac from St Edmund Hall, Oxford in 1891.

== Appointments ==
- Organist of St. Neot's Church, Huntingdonshire 1892
- Deputy Organist at Llandaff Cathedral 1894
- Organist of Framlingham College 1894 - 1896
- Organist of Bridlington Priory 1896 - 1901
- Organist of St. Andrew's Church, Croydon 1902 - 1906
- Organist of Holy Trinity, Aberystwyth 1907 - 1937?

== Compositions ==
He composed:

- I will lay me down in peace
- Except the Lord build the house
- Far down the ages now
- Molique's March from Abraham
- To faithful shepherds watching
- Tarantella for pianoforte
- Mae y eneidiau, etc. (1937).
