= Eric John Fairclough =

British composer

Eric John Fairclough FRCO (4 January 1900 – 1972) was an organist and composer based in England.

== Life ==
He was born in 1900 in Ormskirk, the son of John Fairclough and Clara. He was privately educated and then studied music at the Royal College of Music.

He married Evelyn Anne Guymer.

== Appointments ==
- Assistant organist of Peterborough Cathedral 1918 -1925
- Organist of Deal Parish Church 1925 - 1930
- Organist of Linthorpe Parish Church, Middlesbrough 1930 - 1947
- Organist of Bridlington Priory 1947 - 1950
- Organist of Burlington Church, Bridlington 1950 - 1955
- Organist of St Paul Parish Church, Grange-over-Sands, 1955 - ????

== Compositions ==
He composed organ and church music.
