= Philip of St Frideswide =

Philip of St Frideswide (died after 1191) was an Augustinian canon and head of the Priory of St Frideswide, Oxford.

Philip's identity beyond that of prior is unknown. Gerald of Wales refers to him simply as 'Prioris […] sancte fridheswide Philippi'. He has thus been known in scholarship under names such as 'Philippus de S. Fridiswida', although Richard Sharpe suggested 'Philip of Oxford'.

Philip is the author of a collection of miracles attributed to Frithuswith, The Miracles of St Frideswide (Miracula sancte Frideswide). In the work, he names himself as prior on the day of the translation of her relics, 12 February 1180.
