= Hebblethwaite House =

House in Bridlington, East Riding of Yorkshire, England

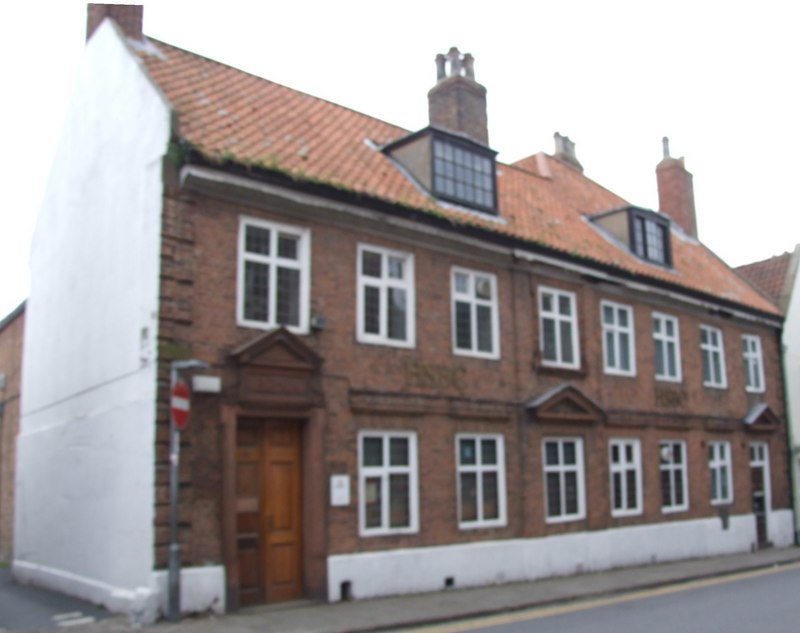
The building, in 2010

Hebblethwaite House is a historic building in Bridlington, a town in the East Riding of Yorkshire, in England.

The building lies on the south side of Westgate in Bridlington. It was constructed around 1670 in the Artisan Mannerist style, for the Hebblethwaite family. In 1926, it was converted to become a bank, the changes being to a design by Walter Brierley and James Hervey Rutherford. The building was grade II* listed in 1951.

The house is built of brown brick on a rendered plinth, with brick rusticated quoins, a moulded string course, an ornamental coved eaves cornice, and a pantile roof. It has two storeys and attics, and is eight bays wide. The fourth bay projects slightly, and originally contained the doorway, later converted into a window under a pediment. The outer bays contain doorways with pediments, the windows are mullioned and transomed, and there are two sloped roof dormers. Inside, there is oak panelling, an early staircase, and one room has a plasterwork ceiling depicting a wreath.

== See also ==
- Grade II* listed buildings in the East Riding of Yorkshire
- Listed buildings in Bridlington (Old Town area)
