= The Board Inn =

Pub in Bridlington, East Riding of Yorkshire, England

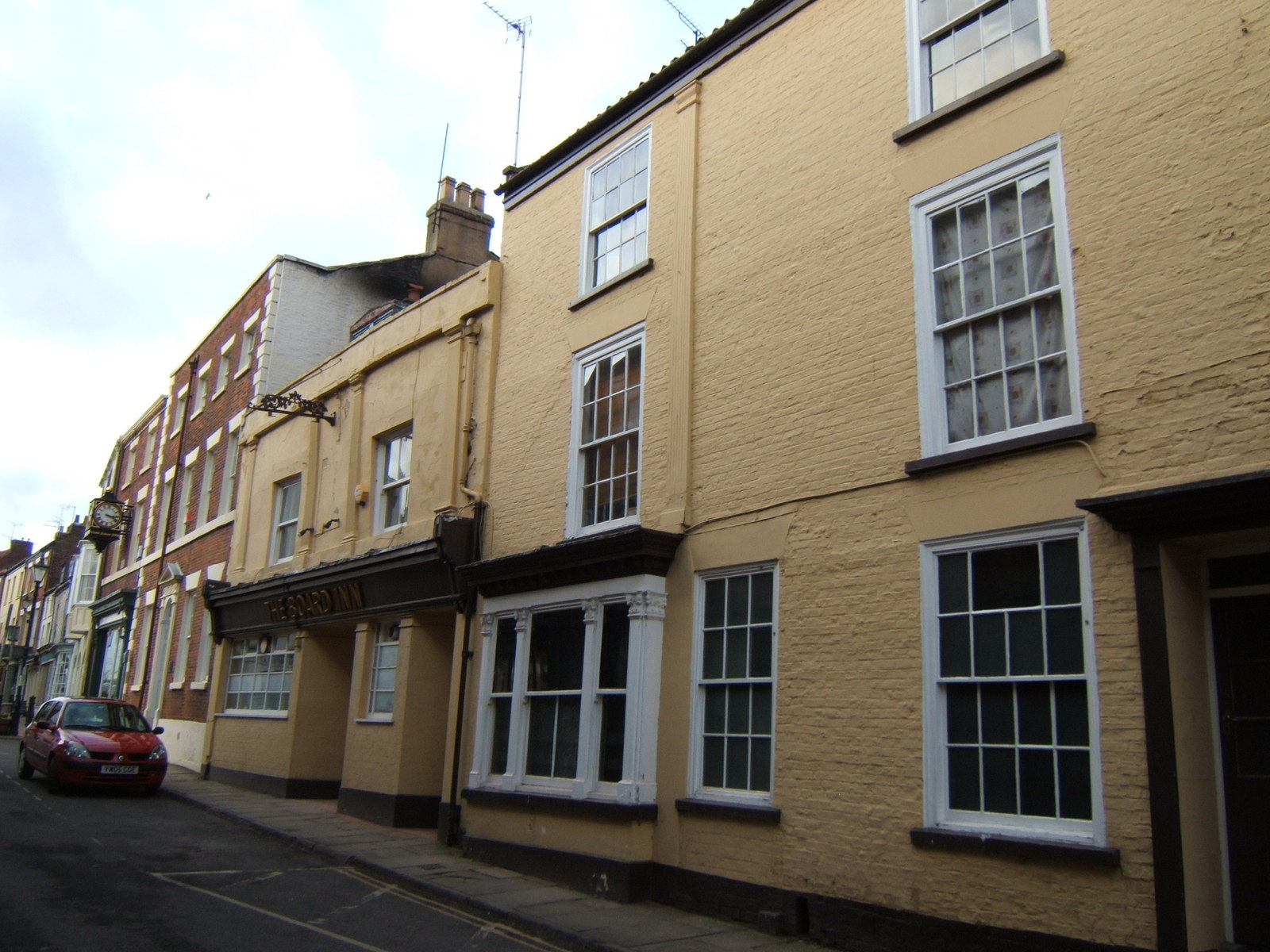
The pub, in 2011

The Board Inn is a historic pub in Bridlington, a town in the East Riding of Yorkshire, in England.

The pub lies on the south side of the High Street in Bridlington. It was built in the 17th century, then was extended to the right in the 18th century. A bay window was added in the 19th century, while the shop front of the older section dates from the 20th century. The building was grade II listed in 1976. In the early 2010s, it was refurbished over a five-year period, the interior featuring brick walls, wooden floors and visible wood beams. There are local stories of ghosts in the building, including one of a small girl.

The pub is in two parts with pantile roofs. The older part is on the left, it is rendered, and has two storeys and three bays. On the ground floor is a modern public house front with a cornice. The upper floor has four fluted pilasters and a parapet with a moulded panel. It contains two sash windows, and above is a roof dormer. The taller right part dates from the 18th century, and is in painted brick. There are three storeys and two bays. On the left bay is a rectangular bay window containing pilaster mullions with carved capitals, and a cornice. On the right is a doorway with pilaster and a hood, and sash windows. Inside, the pub has 17th-century wood panelling and a staircase of similar date.

== See also ==
- Listed buildings in Bridlington (Old Town area)
