= West End House, Bridlington =

Building in Bridlington, East Riding of Yorkshire, England

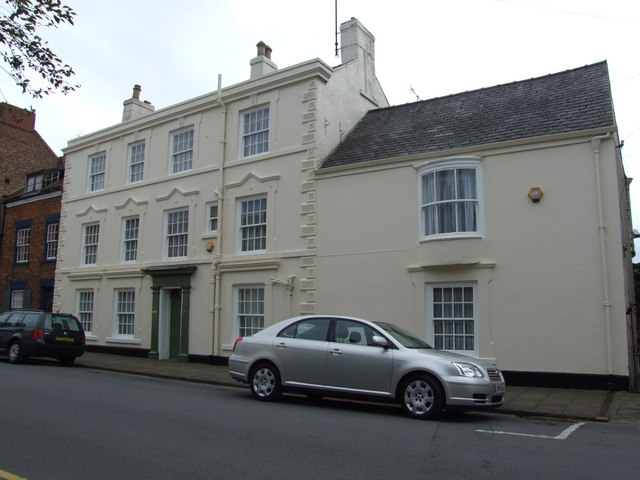
The building, in 2010

West End House is a historic building in Bridlington, a town in the East Riding of Yorkshire, in England.

The house was built in the late 17th century, with its ownership recorded from 1718. Elaborate rendering was applied to the front in the 19th century. The building was grade II listed in 1976. In the early 2000s, it was the home of G. P. Taylor, who restored the property. As of 2022, it had five bedrooms, four reception rooms, two bathrooms, a library, sun room and a scullery.

The house is rendered, on a plinth, with vermiculated rusticated quoins, sill courses, a moulded cornice and a parapet. There are three storeys and four bays. The doorway has pilasters, an entablature, a panelled soffit and jambs, and a rectangular fanlight. The windows are sashes, those in the ground floor with shaped moulded cornices, the middle floor windows have cornices with pediment shaping and shoulders, and the top floor windows with lintels and vermiculated keystones. To the right is a two-storey single-bay extension with a Welsh slate roof, a bow window on the upper floor, and a sash window in a moulded surround below. Some early interior features survive, most notably the large cellar, thought to be a remnant of an earlier building on the site, and to have been constructed with stone taken from Bridlington Priory.

== See also ==
- Listed buildings in Bridlington (Old Town area)
