= Thómas saga Erkibyskups =

Icelandic saga

Thómas saga Erkibyskups (English: Saga of Archbishop Thomas) is an Icelandic saga on Saint Thomas Becket written in the 14th century and based on earlier sources: a now lost "Life" by Robert of Cricklade which was written soon after Becket's murder, a "Life" by Benet of St Albans, and an Icelandic translation of the "Quadrilogus" (a composite life based on 12th-century biographers). It provides some unique details, like Thomas speaking with a stammer; these details mostly come from Robert's "Life", which also was a source for Benet's.
