= Benet of St Albans =

12th-century monk and biographer

Benet of St Albans was a medieval English monk and biographer of Thomas Becket.

Benet was a monk at the Benedictine monastery of St Albans Abbey during the abbacy of Simon (1167–1183). About 1184, Benet composed a hagiography of Becket in French verse, basing it partly on the now-lost work of Robert of Cricklade. This set of verses is one of the secondary sources for Becket's life.

The verses have been edited and published by F. Michel in 1844. In turn, Benet's work was used as a source for the 14th-century Icelandic saga about Becket titled Thómas saga erkibyskups.
