= Craven House, Bridlington =

House in Bridlington, East Riding of Yorkshire, England

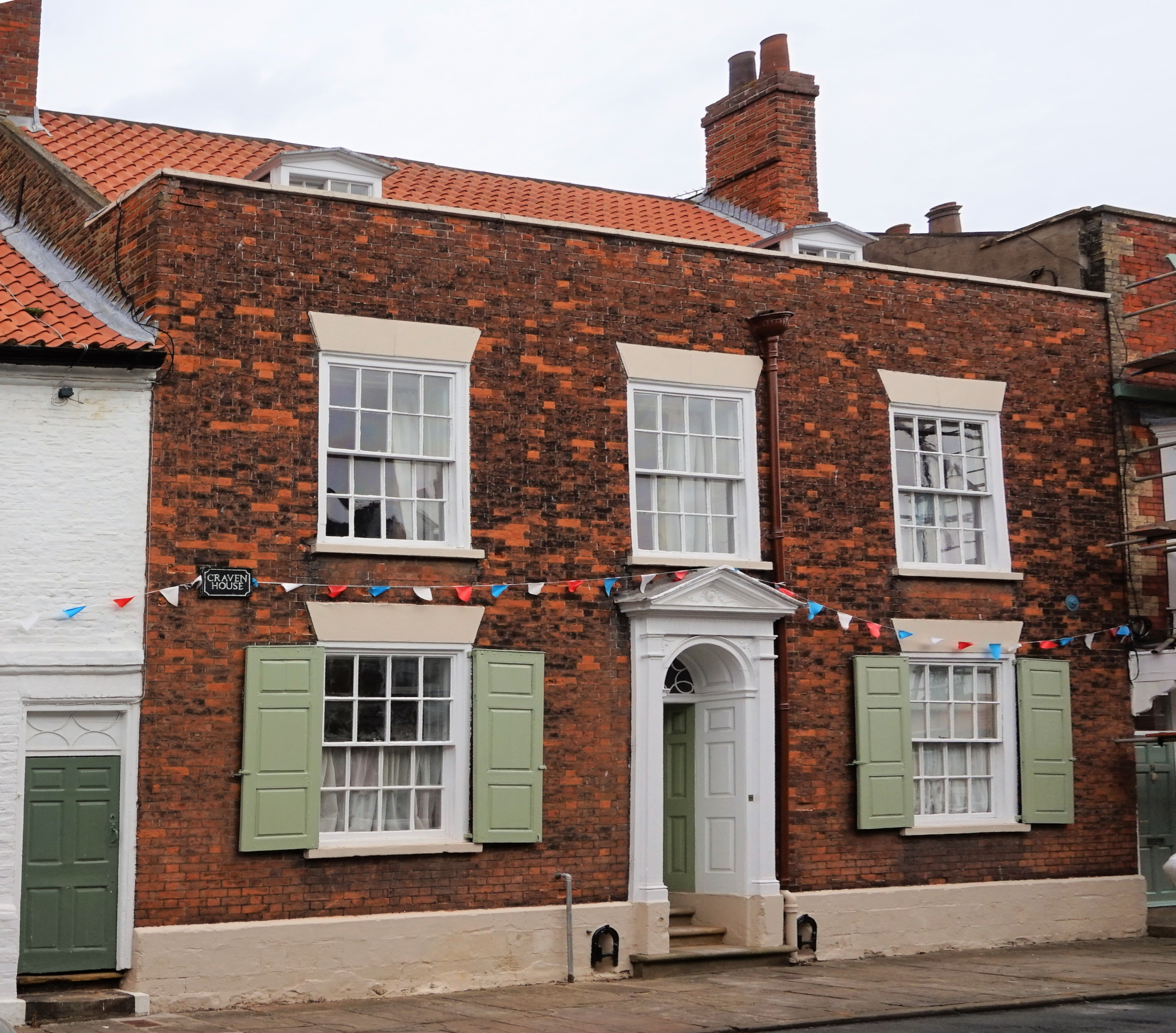
The building, in 2023

Craven House is a historic building in Bridlington, a town in the East Riding of Yorkshire, in England.

The house lies on the north side of the High Street in Bridlington. It was built in the 17th century, and was remodelled in 1806, the work including a new facade. This work was probably designed by John Matson. The building was grade II* listed in 1951.

The house is built of brick on a rendered plinth, with a parapet and a pantile roof. It has two storeys and is three bays wide. In the centre, steps lead up to a recessed doorway with reeded pilasters, fluted capitals, a decorated semicircular fanlight, a panelled soffit and reveals, a frieze, a fluted dentilled cornice, and a pediment with a lion's mask and swags in the tympanum. The windows are sashes with stucco lintels, and shutters on the ground floor. The doorway is flanked by inset foot scrapers. Inside, much of the decoration from 1806 survives.

== See also ==
- Grade II* listed buildings in the East Riding of Yorkshire
- Listed buildings in Bridlington (Old Town area)
