= Raymond Sunderland =

English organist

Raymond Sunderland FRCO (21 December 1921 – 25 December 1977) was an English organist and composer.

== Background ==
Raymond Sunderland holding a copy of his "Requiem". Photo courtesy Rossparry.co.uk

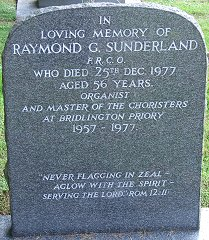
Raymond Sunderland's gravestone in Bridlington Priory churchyard (2008)

Raymond G Sunderland started learning organ at age 12 and until 16 he studied with his father, the organist of Broadstone Baptist Church, Yorkshire.

During the Second World War he served in the Royal Armoured Corps and in 1944–45, whilst serving in Belgium, he gave a series of organ recitals from memory in Ypres Cathedral. After the war, he studied with Shackleton Pollard at Halifax Parish Church and served there as Assistant Organist. In 1951 he gained his FRCO and was appointed organist and choirmaster at Burnley Parish Church in Lancashire; whilst there he became also organist to the Halifax Choral Society. In 1955 he moved to St. Edmunds Church, Roundhay, Leeds, before being appointed in 1957 to his final post as Organist and Master of the Choristers at Bridlington Priory Church. Raymond Sunderland's "abilities as a performer, and not least as an improviser of immense talent, were widely acclaimed."

Raymond Sunderland died in the early hours of Christmas morning 1977 in Bridlington Priory having just played the organ for the Midnight Communion; he is buried in the Priory churchyard.

== Appointments ==
- Organist and choirmaster, Burnley Parish Church 1951 - 1955
- Organist, St. Edmunds Church, Roundhay, Leeds 1955 - 1957
- Organist and Master of the Choristers at Bridlington Priory 1957 - 1977

== Compositions ==
- A Meditation for Eastertide
  - dedicated "To the Venerable Rev Eric Treacy, Archdeacon and Vicar of Halifax, after a sermon at Evensong Palm Sunday 1955"
- Requiem
  - composed following the assassination of President John F Kennedy in 1963. The manuscript is headed with a quote from Psalm 127 which was to have been the text for Kennedy's speech on the day of his death: "Except the Lord keep the house, the watchman waketh but in vain."
- Ceremonial Fanfare and March
  - written for the re-dedication of the Priory organ in 1968 following its rebuild by the firm of Laycock and Bannister; dedicated to Conrad Eden, organist at Durham Cathedral, who played for the re-dedication service
- Bridal Fanfare and March
  - written for the wedding of his daughter Susan in 1972 and dedicated to her

== Recordings ==
On the Vista label is a recording "The Organ of Bridlington Priory" (VPS1006), dating from October 1972, made by Raymond Sunderland himself on the, then recently restored, Priory organ. The recording includes works by Karg-Elert, Healy Willan and a rare performance of Garth Edmundson's three movement Apostolic Symphony as well as the "Bridal Fanfare and March" written for the wedding of one of his own daughters. The content of this LP was re-released in 2003 as part of a CD "Bridlington Priory Organ" (BP 001) with additional tracks by the current Priory organist, Michael Smith, including Sunderland's "Ceremonial Fanfare and March".
