= St Frideswide's Priory =

Former house of Augustinian canons

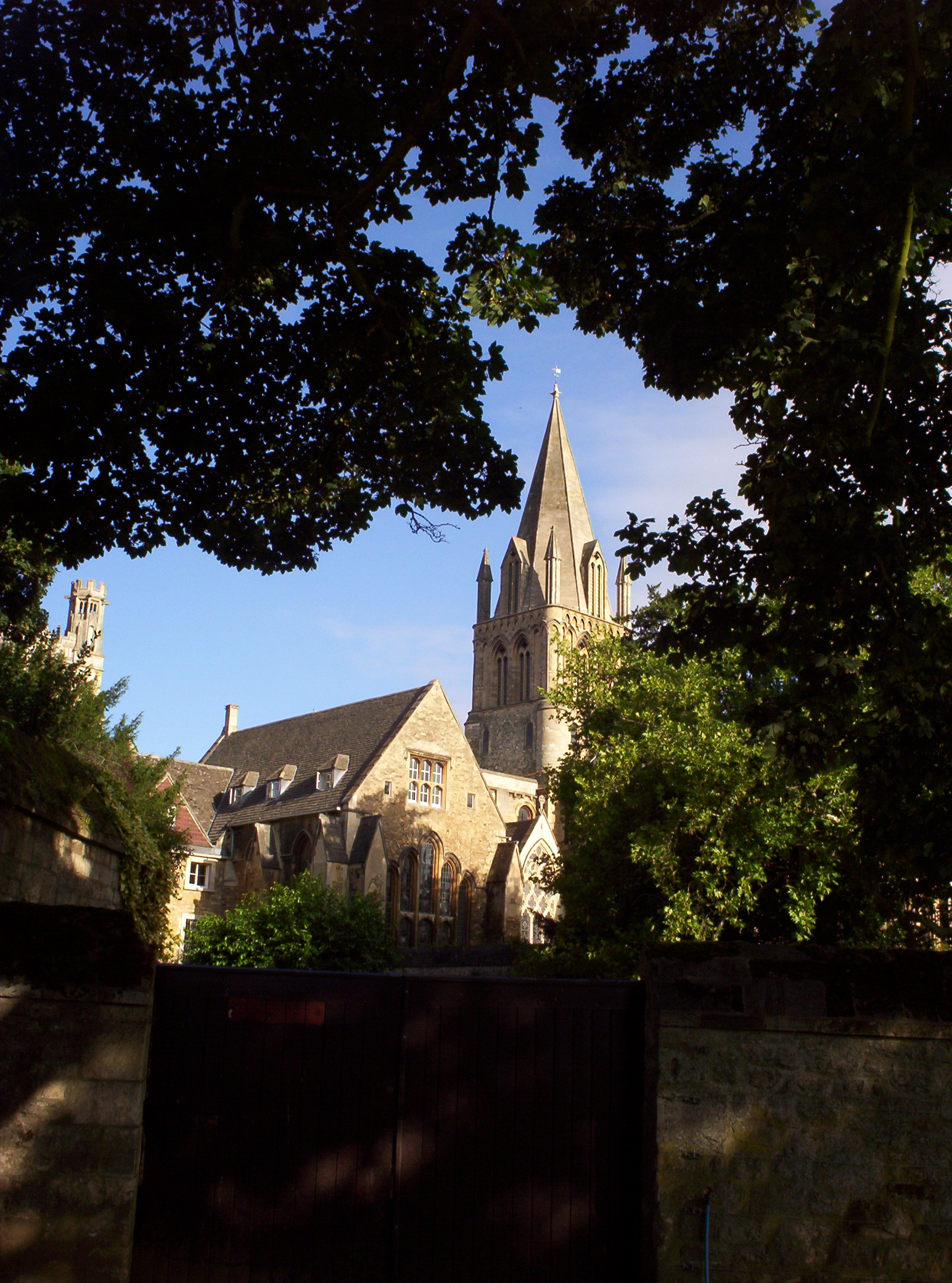
St Frideswide's Priory, now Christ Church Cathedral

St Frideswide's Priory was established as a priory of Augustinian canons regular in Oxford in 1122. The priory was established by Gwymund, chaplain to Henry I of England. Among its most illustrious priors were the writers Robert of Cricklade and Philip of Oxford.

== History ==
Frideswide was the daughter of a 7th-century sub-king of Mercia named Dida of Eynsham whose lands occupied western Oxfordshire and the upper reaches of the River Thames. When his wife Safrida died, Dida assisted his daughter in building a monastery, dedicating it to the Holy Trinity, the Virgin Mary and all the saints. Frideswide became the first abbess. The original nunnery founded by Frideswide was destroyed in 1002, during the events of the St. Brice's Day massacre. The king in recompense rebuilt it, and established secular canons there.

Henry I gave the church with its endowments to Gwymund, a royal chaplain. In 1122 Gwymund installed Augustinian canons. The second prior, Robert of Cricklade, wrote a book on miracles attributed to the intercession of Thomas Becket. In 1336 the citizens of the town compelled the prior to forego the priory's special rights during the six days' fair beginning on St. Frideswide's day. Baroness Montagu was a major benefactor of St Frideswide's.

In 1524, Cardinal Wolsey dissolved the Priory. Using funds from the dissolution of Wallingford Priory and other minor priories, he then used its premises, together with those of other adjacent religious houses, to found a new college to be called Cardinal College on the land where the Priory once stood.

After Wolsey fell from power in 1530, King Henry VIII took over the nascent foundation, which he renamed Christ Church ("Aedes Christi"). The Church's five western bays of the nave made during the time of the Augustinian canons were demolished to make space to build the main quadrangle of the new college (now called Tom Quad). The intention was to demolish the remainder of the Church and replace it with a chapel on the north side of the quadrangle. That never happened, and the surviving portion of the Church, including the five remaining bays of the nave, became both the chapel for the new college, Christ Church and the cathedral for the new Diocese of Oxford which Henry VIII had separated from the Diocese of Lincoln.

== Burials ==
- Frithuswith
- Lady Elizabeth Montacute
- William Orchard (architect)
- Edward Pococke
