= Star Inn, Bridlington =

Inn in Bridlington, East Riding of Yorkshire, England

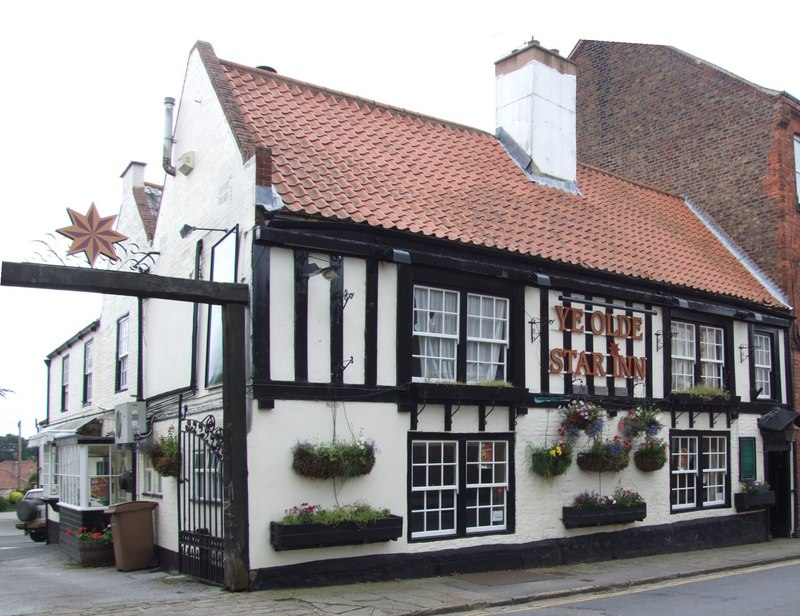
The pub, in 2010

The Star Inn, also known as Ye Olde Star Inn, is a historic pub in Bridlington, a town in the East Riding of Yorkshire, in England.

The building, on Westgate in Bridlington, was probably constructed in the 17th century, then the windows were altered in the 18th century. Fake timber framing was applied in the 20th century, which Nikolaus Pevsner describes as "crude". The building was grade II listed in 1976. In 2016, the group "East Yorkshire Psychic Research" investigated the pub, and claimed to have seen a mysterious cigar-shaped light.

The pub is built of painted brick, rendered on the front, on a rendered plinth, with applied timber framing on the upper floor, and a double span pantile roof with tumbled brickwork on the gable end. It has two storeys, and a double depth plan. On the right is a doorway with grooved pilasters, a decorative fascia, and a pedimented hood. The windows are sashes, mostly in pairs.

== See also ==
- Listed buildings in Bridlington (Old Town area)
