= Arthur Edgar Perry =

Arthur Edgar Perry FRCO (23 March 1864 – 26 April 1925) was an organist and composer based in England.

== Life ==
He was born on 23 March 1864 in Harlow, Essex, the son of Alfred Perry and Martha Emma Robinson. As a boy he joined the choir of All Saints' Church, Hockerhill.

He trained at Peterborough Cathedral.

He married Elizabeth Mary Vickers on 8 August 1906 in Trinity Methodist Chapel, Crewe, and they had:

- Geoffrey Alfred Vickers Perry 1910 - 1994
- Arthur John Vickers Perry 1912–1984

He died suddenly on 26 April 1925.

== Appointments ==
- Organist of Elsenham Church, 1876
- Organist at Winchester College
- Organist of Old Malton Priory Church ca. 1890
- Organist of Bridlington Priory
- Organist of St. James' Church, Hatcham
- Organist of Holy Trinity Church, Stepney
- Organist of Holy Trinity Church, Lee
- Organist of St. Hilda's Church, Crofton Park

== Compositions ==
He composed music for organ and choir.
