= Frithuswith =

Anglo-Saxon nobleman

Saint Frithuswith
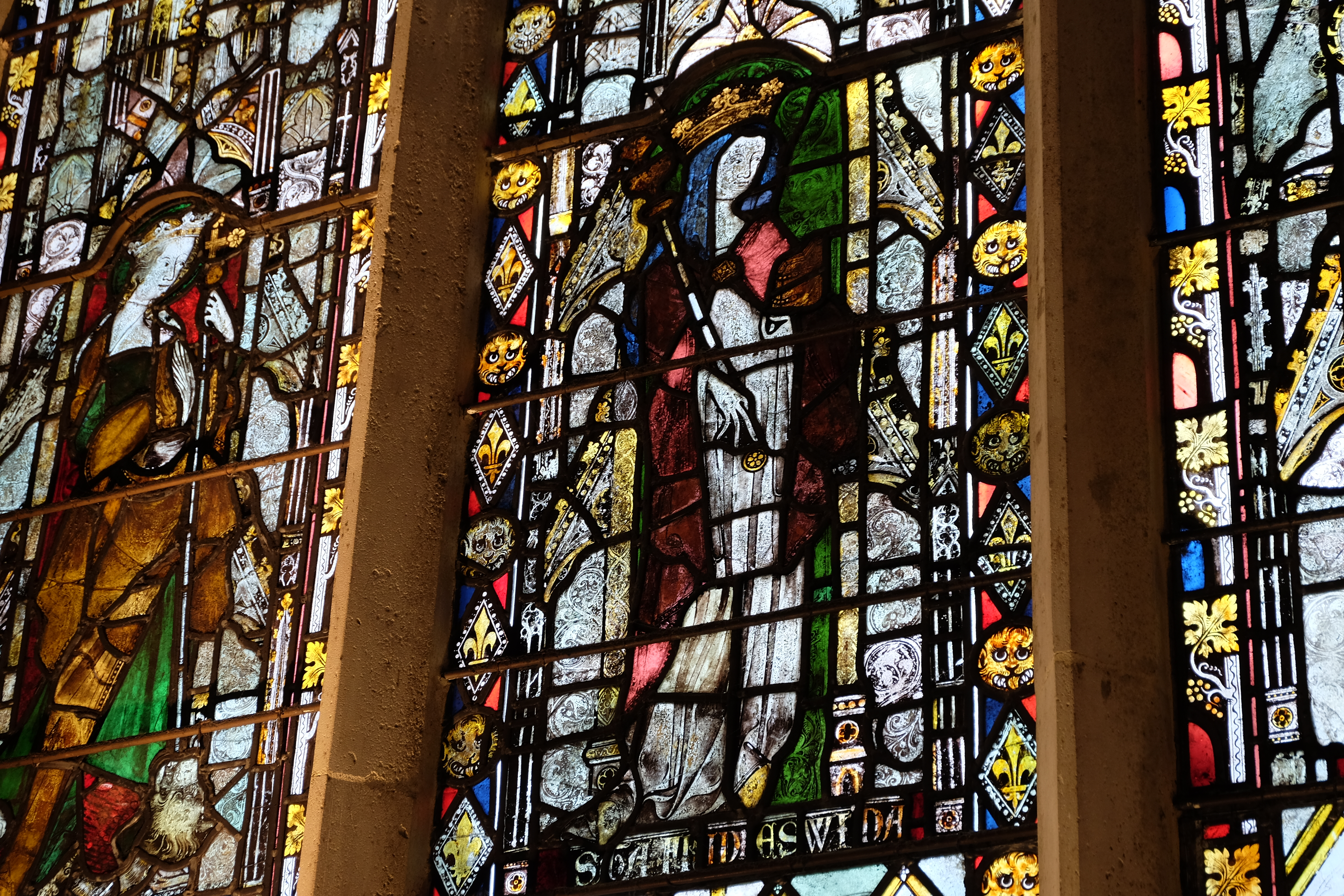
- Depiction of Margaret the Virgin and Frideswide in Christ Church, Oxford, 14th century.
- Born: 7th century upper Thames region
- Died: 19 October 727; Oxford
- Venerated in: Anglicanism; Eastern Orthodox Church; Roman Catholic Church
- Major shrine: Christ Church, Oxford
- Feast: 19 October; 12 February (translation); 15 May (invention)
- Attributes: pastoral staff; a fountain; the ox
- Patronage: Oxford, England; University of Oxford

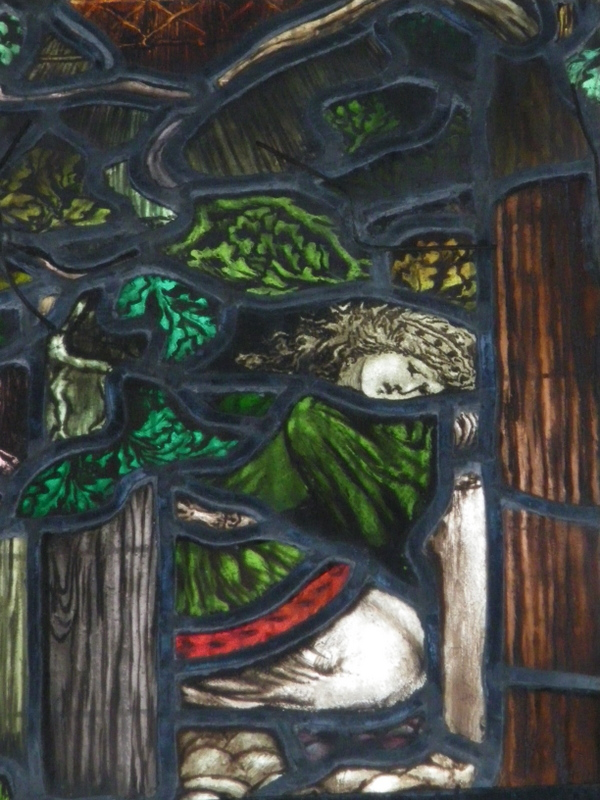
Frithuswith hiding with swine. From a stained glass in the Lady Chapel At Gloucester Cathedral.

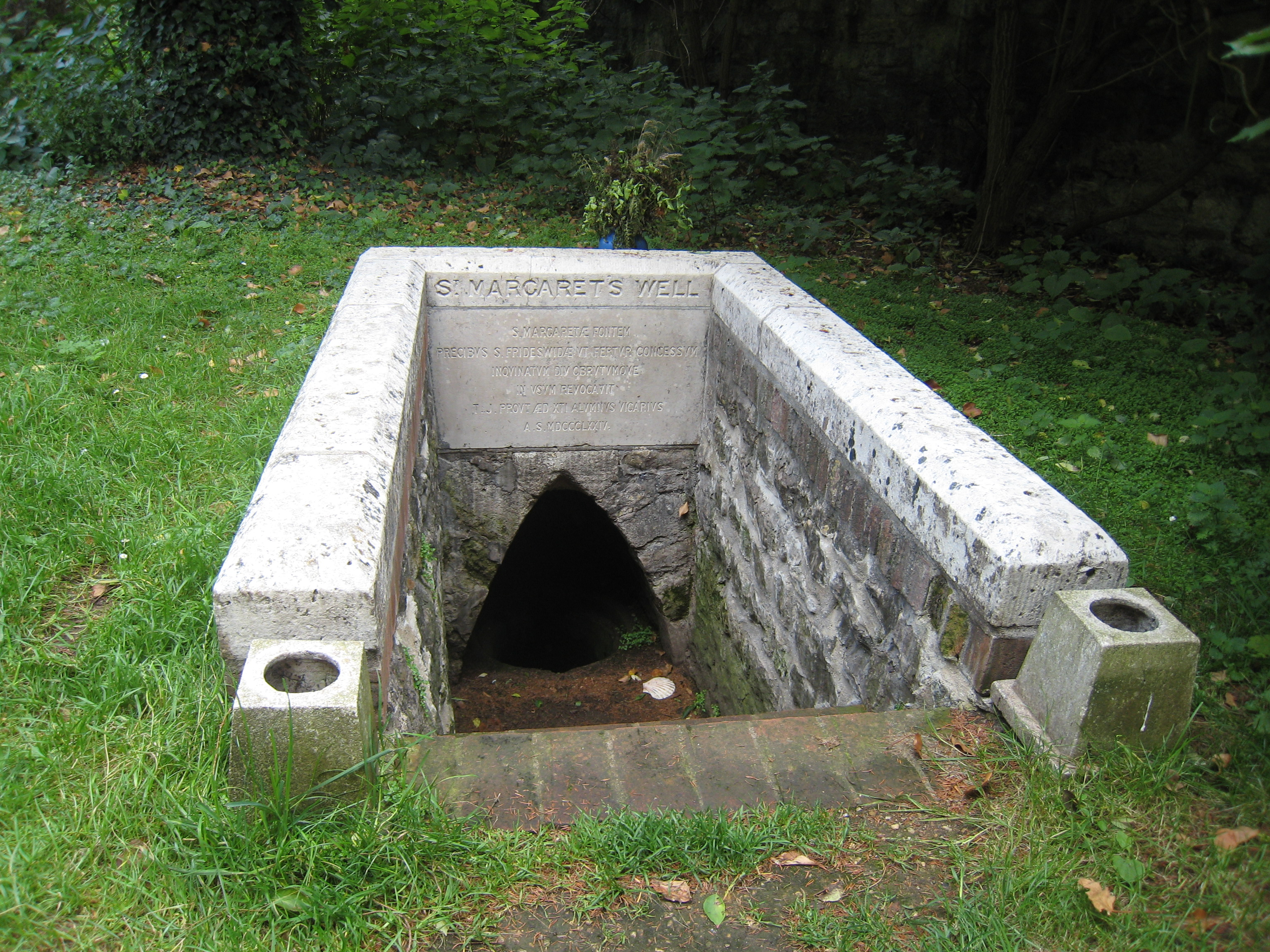
St Margaret's Well, Binsey, Oxfordshire.

Frithuswith or Fritheswith (Old English: Fryðesƿeoð or Friðesƿyð, Latinized Frideswide; died 19 October 727) was an English princess and abbess who became the patron saint of Oxford and its university. She is credited as the foundress of a monastery later incorporated into Christ Church Cathedral, Oxford. She was the daughter of a sub-king of Mercia named Dida of Eynsham whose lands occupied western Oxfordshire and the upper reaches of the River Thames.

== Life ==
The earliest narrative of the saint is the Life of Saint Fritheswith the Virgin (Latin: Vita sanctae Fritheswithae uirginis) preserved in a manuscript from the early twelfth century, copied in the hand of John of Worcester. A longer adaptation of this work is attributed to Robert of Cricklade, head of the Priory of St Frideswide, Oxford.

The story recounts that Frideswide was born to King Didan and his wife Safrida. She founds a monastery with her father's assistance while still young. Her parents die soon after. Algar, king of Leicester seeks to marry her in spite of her vow of celibacy. When she refuses him, Algar attempts to abduct her, and Frideswide flees into the wilderness. On fleeing, she finds a ship sent by God which takes her to Bampton, Oxfordshire. Algar searches for her in Oxford, but the people refuse to tell him where she is, and he is struck blind.

Frideswide later seeks greater solitude and migrates to Binsey, Oxfordshire. To avoid having to fetch water from the distant River Thames, she prays to God and a well springs up. The well water has healing properties and many people come to seek it out. A nineteenth-century reconstruction of this well can be found at the Church of Saint Margaret in Binsey. She later returns to Oxford and remains abbess until her death.

Two Middle English adaptations of the Life of Frideswide are included in the South English legendaries. These include several minor variants on the narrative.

== The priory ==
St Frideswide's Priory, a medieval Augustinian house (some of the buildings of which were incorporated into Christ Church, Oxford following the dissolution of the monasteries) is claimed to be the site of her abbey and relics. From early times the abbey appears to have been an important landowner in the area; however, it was destroyed in 1002 during the events of the St. Brice's Day massacre. A shrine was kept at the abbey in Frithuswith's honour; later a monastery was built there for Augustinian canons.

In 1180, the Archbishop of Canterbury Richard of Dover translated Frithuswith's remains to a new shrine in the monastery church, an event that was attended by King Henry II of England. The later history of the monastery was chequered, but it remained sufficiently prominent that Catherine of Aragon visited the shrine during her final pregnancy.

The priory seal, designed in the late 1180s, depicts Frideswide with a lily and a set of wax tablets.

Henry Chichele, the archbishop of Canterbury, officially declared Frideswide the patron saint of Oxford and the University of Oxford in 1440. Her feast day is 19 October, the traditional day of her death; the date of her translation is commemorated on 12 February; and the invention (discovery) of her relics on 15 May.

The shrine was repeatedly vandalized during the Dissolution of the Monasteries and beyond. In 1546 the monastery church became (and still remains) the cathedral church for the diocese of Oxford. Her shrine was reinstated by Queen Mary in 1558, but was later desecrated by James Calfhill, a Calvinist canon of the church, who was intent on suppressing her cult. As a result, Frithuswith's remains were mixed with those of Catherine Dammartin, wife of Peter Martyr Vermigli, and they remain so to this day.

== In modern tradition ==
Frideswide remains the patron saint of Oxford and its university, and there is a revived tradition of pilgrimages to Christ Church. In later art, she is depicted holding the pastoral staff of an abbess with a fountain springing up near her and an ox at her feet. She appears in medieval stained glass, and in Pre-Raphaelite stained glass by Edward Burne-Jones in Christ Church Cathedral, Oxford, in the chapel where her shrine is also located.

Elizabeth Goudge's 1938 historical novel, Towers in the Mist (Gerald Duckworth, London, 1938) describes the disinterment and eventual reburial of Catherine Dammartin comingled with the remains of St Frideswide in Chapter 8 "Sunday", Part 2. Goudge's novel is set in Oxford during 1565 and 1566, culminating in the first visit to Oxford by Queen Elizabeth I.

== See also ==
- St Frideswide's Church, Oxford
- Frideswide Square in central Oxford
- Frithuwold of Chertsey, a purported ancestor of Frithuswith
- List of Catholic saints
