= Dida of Eynsham =

Anglo-Saxon noble and sub-king of Oxford and the Chilterns, England

Dida of Eynsham (also called Didan or Didanius) was a 7th-century sub-king of the Mercian territory around Oxford, near the Chilterns. Little is known of his life, although he is mentioned briefly in the various Anglo-Saxon chronicles, and he has been purported, since ancient times, to be the father of St Frideswide, patron saint of Oxford.

== Biography ==
The date of Dida's birth is not known. He appears to have acted as a sub-king of the Chilterns around 670–675. Anglo-Saxon chronicles describe him as controlling areas of Mercian territory around Oxford and the Chilterns. He appears to have been in constant dispute with the West Saxons over land boundaries. It is speculated that he was a Mercian nobleman who was raised to the status of sub-king by Wulfhere of Mercia; although it is not known for certain how long he held this position, or even if he lost his authority only upon his death. Because of his connection to St. Frideswide, it is also assumed that he was related to the sub-king of Surrey, Frithuwold of Chertsey.

The chronicles do not record the date of Dida's death.

== Legends ==
In a Vita (or Life) of St Frideswide, William of Malmsbury mentioned Dida, and describes him as "a catholic and upright man", who was married to a "worthy wife" named Safrida. Their only child was Frideswide, whom he ordered to be baptised. When Safrida died, Dida built a church at the behest of his daughter, dedicating it to the Holy Trinity, the Virgin Mary and all the saints. There he allowed Frideswide to become its first abbess. After the death of Dida, a certain Algar of Leicestershire (apparently Æthelbald of Mercia) succeeded him and wooed Frideswide; but she, rejecting his advances, escaped from him until the providence of God caused him to fall from his horse and break his neck.

Frideswide continued as the abbess of the monastery at Oxford until her death. She was later to become patron saint of Oxford and of the university there.

== See also ==
- Anglo-Saxon Christianity
- The Anglo-Saxon Chronicle
