= Bridlington Priory =

Priory Church of St Mary, Bridlington
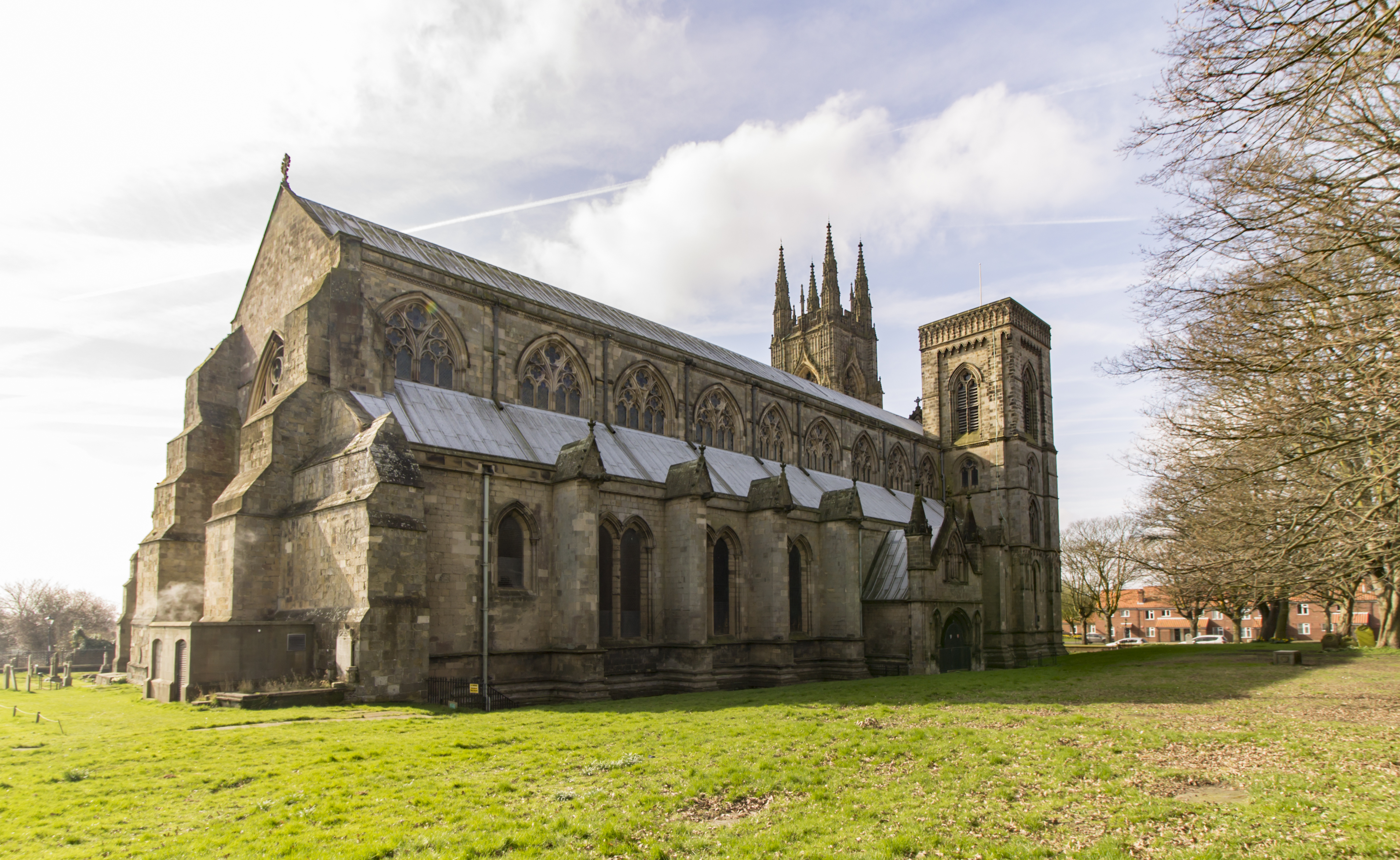
- Priory Church of St Mary, Bridlington

- Location within East Riding of Yorkshire
- 54.09431°N 0.20178°W
- OS grid reference: TA 17701 67985
- Location: Bridlington
- Country: England
- Denomination: Church of England
- Churchmanship: Broad Church
- Website: Priory Church of St Mary Bridlington

History
- Status: Parish church
- Founded: 1113
- Founder: Walter de Gant
- Dedication: St Mary

Architecture
- Functional status: Active
- Heritage designation: Grade I listed
- Designated: 7 September 1961
- Style: Gothic

Administration
- Province: York
- Diocese: York
- Archdeaconry: East Riding
- Deanery: Bridlington
- Benefice: Boston
- Parish: Bridlington

The Priory Church of St Mary, Bridlington, grid reference TA177680, commonly known as Bridlington Priory Church is a parish church in Bridlington, East Riding of Yorkshire, England, in the Diocese of York. It is on the site of an Augustinian priory founded in 1113 which was dissolved during the Dissolution of the Monasteries. In 1951 it was designated a Grade I Listed Building.

== History ==
=== Foundation ===
Bridlington Priory was founded around 1113 by Walter de Gant, for Augustinian Canons Regular, one of the earliest Augustinian houses in England, with an adjoining convent. Its foundation was confirmed in charters by King Henry I of England The site had formerly been a Saxon church and nunnery. When complete, the building was over 400 ft long (120 m) and 75 ft wide (23 m), with a transept which was 150 ft long (46 m). The first prior is thought to have been called Guicheman or Wickeman.

=== Early history ===
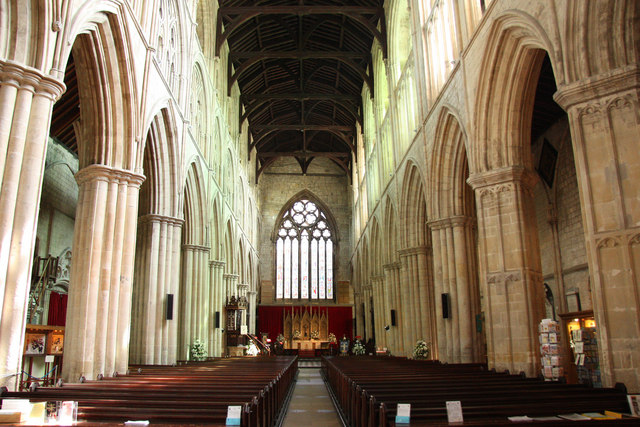
Interior of the Priory

The priory was favoured by kings and their nobles and soon owned land across Yorkshire. The Canons from the priory established Newburgh Priory in 1145. King Stephen granted that the priory should have the right to have the property of felons and fugitives within the town and proceeds from the harbour, and later King John gave the priory the right to hold a yearly fair in the town in 1200. During the conflict between Stephen and Matilda, William le Gros, Earl of Albemarle (a Manor in Holderness which is now ‘lost’) advanced on the priory and expelled the canons in his campaign against Gilbert de Gant of Hunmanby. He fortified the priory and later gave the priory six parcels of land, one at Boynton and the rest in Holderness. Henry IV appropriated the rectory of Scarborough to the priory which was later confirmed by Henry V, Henry VI and Edward IV. A royal licence was also granted by Richard II in 1388 to crenellate the priory with fortifications but although history tells there were four gates, 3 of those gates were in the main priory land, Kirk Gate, West Gate, Nun Gate and these were used as daily entrances in and out of the building enclosure itself. Only the Bayle Gate was a fortified entrance standing at the borders and the Priory itself was in fact never walled. The priory also had a large library, which was listed by John Leland shortly before the dissolution.

=== Dissolution of the Monasteries ===
The priory was dissolved in 1538 by Henry VIII during the Dissolution of the Monasteries. The priory was very wealthy at the time of the dissolution and its yearly income was estimated to be £547 6s. 11½d; it owned land stretching from Blubberhouses in the north, and Askham Richard, down to the Spurn Point.

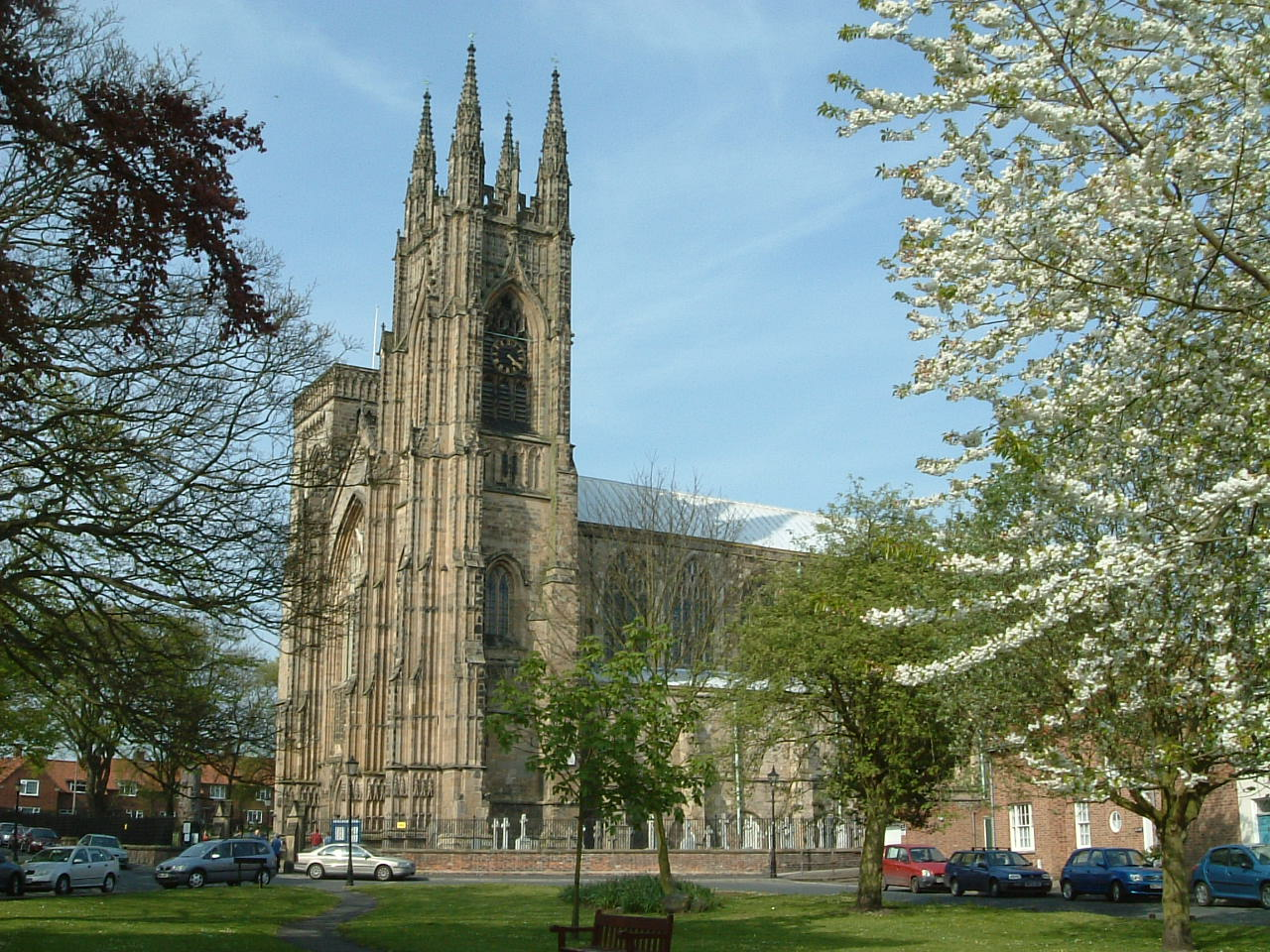
Bridlington Priory from the south-west

The condition of the priory at the dissolution can be gathered from the report of Richard Pollard, a surveyor of Henry VIII. The Church was more than 390 feet in length, surrounded by the Chapter House, Treasury, Cloister, Prior's Hall, Infirmary. The quire of the mediaeval church contained woodwork by the celebrated William Brownflete (or Bromflete) who had made the stalls in Beverley Minster, Manchester Cathedral and Ripon Cathedral, and a number of churches under the patronage of Lady Margaret Beaufort, including Gresford and Mold churches, and the chapel of St John's College, Cambridge. All the priory buildings were destroyed except the nave, which became the parish church, and the gatehouse, which is now the Bayle Museum. Some of the stones from the old priory were used in the construction of the piers at Bridlington. The last Prior, William Wode, was executed at Tyburn for his part in the Pilgrimage of Grace.

=== Restoration ===
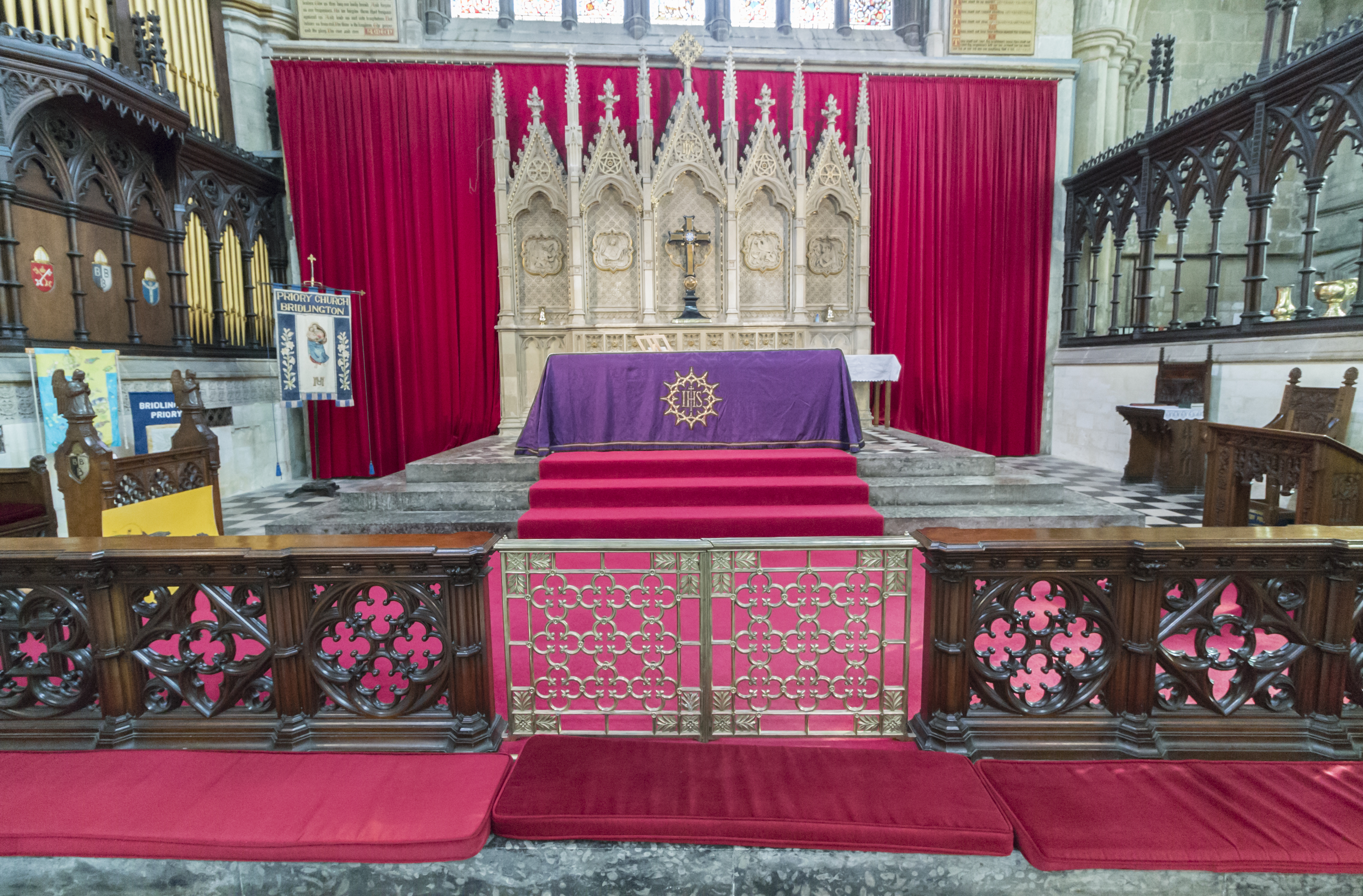
The altar and chancel

For three centuries after the dissolution, the nave continued to be used as the parish church and only a third of the building was actually used by the congregation. From 1846 the parish began to raise funds to restore the church and it was partially re-roofed; the west window was opened out and filled with stained glass; the interior was white-washed; and the east window also was filled with stained glass. This work was carried out by the Lancaster partnership of Paley and Austin, but their work was not to the satisfaction of the church authorities. Around 1874 the church employed Sir George Gilbert Scott to completely refurbish the church as it is today. The total cost of the restoration was about £27,000 (equivalent to £2,639,700 in 2025).

== Organ ==
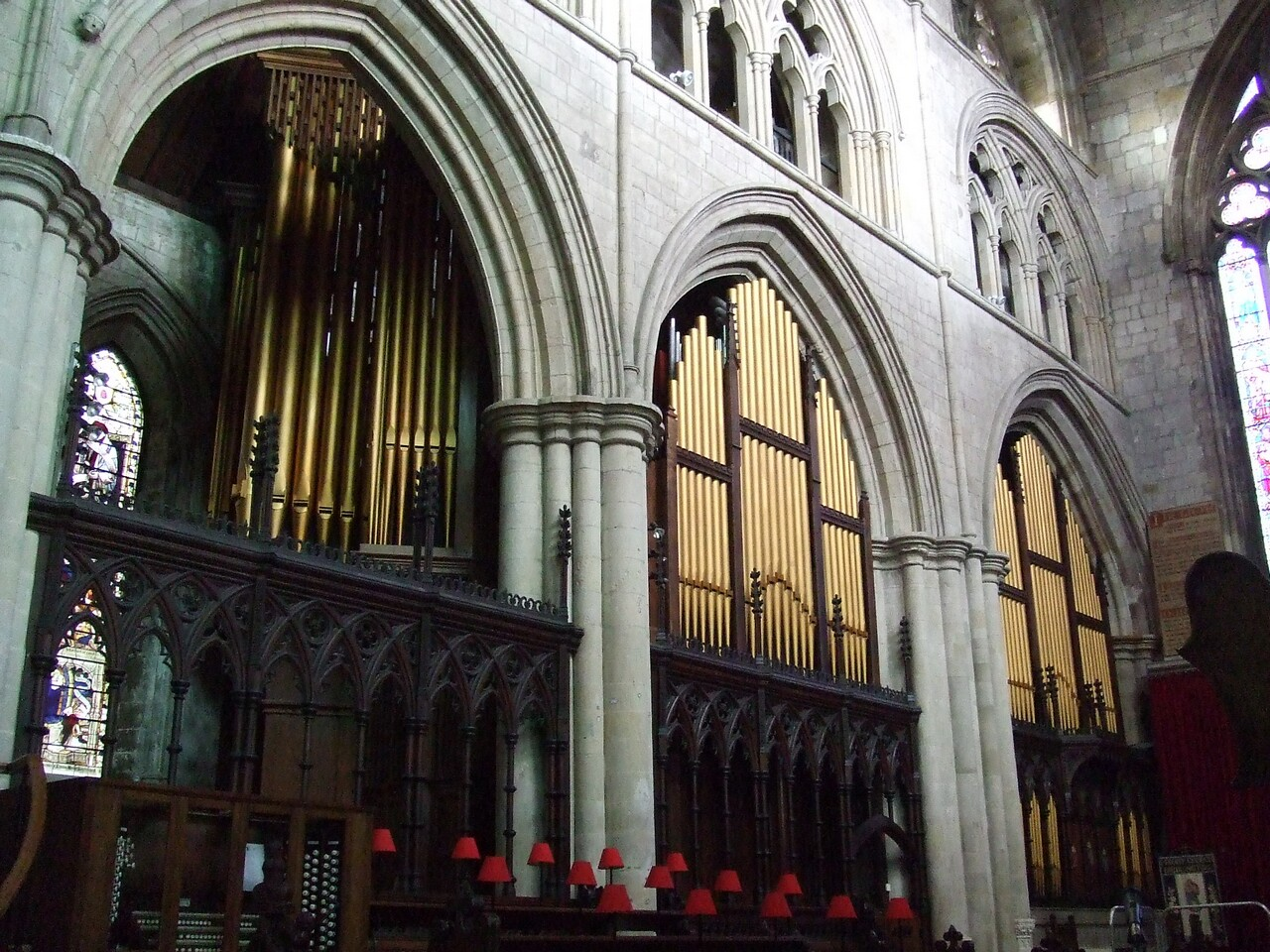
The organ

In 1834 John Lowrey presented a pipe organ which had been built by John Parkin of York. It was enlarged in 1838 by Robert Postill of York and subjected to further additions by Forster and Andrews in 1851 and then it was moved in 1857 by the same firm. The organ left the church in 1889 when it was moved to Mr Grindall's Music Room, Holderness Road, Hull and in 1911 to Emmanuel Church, Bridlington.

A new organ was built in 1889 by the Belgian organ builder Charles Anneessens. Various adjustments were made in the 20th century, before it was restored and enlarged between 2004 and 2006 by Nicholson. It has been recorded a number of times and is played by Daniel Moult in the film and recording Virtuoso! Music for Organ.

=== Organists ===
- George Fox
- William Turner 1857 – 1861 (formerly organist at Pocklington)
- J. W. Wilson 1862–1869
- T. S. Partridge 1870–1885
- J. E. W. Lord 1889–1892 (afterwards organist of St Mary's Church, Harrogate)
- Arthur Edgar Perry 1892–1895
- Arthur Charles Edwards 1896–1901
- George Pattman 1901–1904 (later organist of St Mary's Cathedral, Glasgow)
- Bernard Johnson 1904–1909 (afterwards organist of Albert Hall, Nottingham)
- Arthur Percy Stephenson 1909-ca. 1913
- Sydney Weale 1914–1916 (formerly organist of Londonderry Cathedral)
- Arthur Robinson 1919 –1947
- Eric John Fairclough 1947–1950
- Mervyn John Byers 1952–1957 (afterwards organist of St Andrew's Cathedral, Sydney)
- Raymond Sunderland 1957–1977
- Geoffrey Pearce 1984–1987 (afterwards organist at Selby Abbey)
- Michael Smith 1987–2019
- Paul Dewhurst 2020–

Organ Scholars

- Charlie Leeson 2012 – 2017
- Christopher Too 2012 – 2013
- Jake Leach 2017–2019

== Bells ==
The tower contains a ring of eight bells cast in 1902 by Taylor of Loughborough. The tenor weight is 2,870 pounds (1,300 kg) and the bells ring in the key of D.

== Clock ==
The tower clock was manufactured by Gillett, Bland and Co of Croydon London. It was constructed to strike the hours on a bell of 28 long hundredweight (1,400 kg) and to chime the Cambridge Quarters on four other bells. The time was shown on three skeleton iron dials, each 7 feet 6 inches (2.29 m) in diameter with ornamental centres, the figures, minutes and hands being gilt. The main clock frame was of cast iron. The clock was fitted with a double three-legged Gravity escapement, and the pendulum compensated for temperature changes with a combination of zinc and iron tubes. It was set going on 4 November 1880 by Miss Blakeney, the eldest daughter of the vicar.

== People connected to the Priory ==
- St John of Bridlington, English saint
- Peter Langtoft, who wrote a history of England in Anglo-Norman verse
- Robert of Bridlington, fourth prior and theologian
- Sir George Ripley, 15th-century English alchemist
- Ginger Lacey, Battle of Britain fighter ace (memorial plaque in the Priory)

== See also ==
- Grade I listed churches in the East Riding of Yorkshire
- Listed buildings in Bridlington (Old Town area)
- List of English abbeys, priories and friaries serving as parish churches
