= Alfred Smith (architect) =

English architect (1850-?)

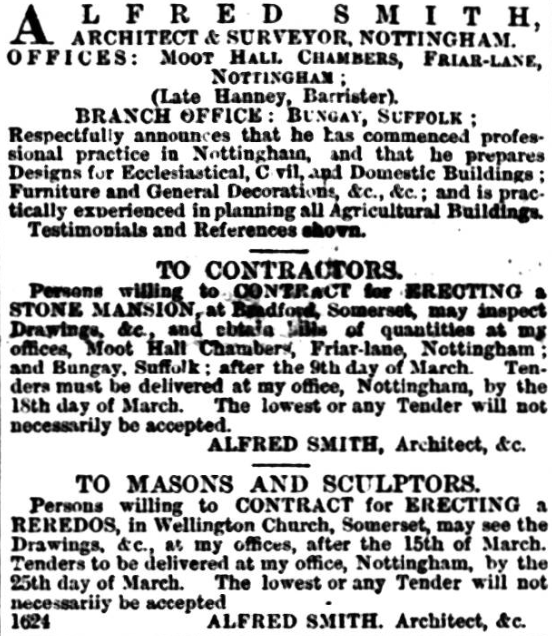
Advertisement from the Nottingham Journal 25 February 1874

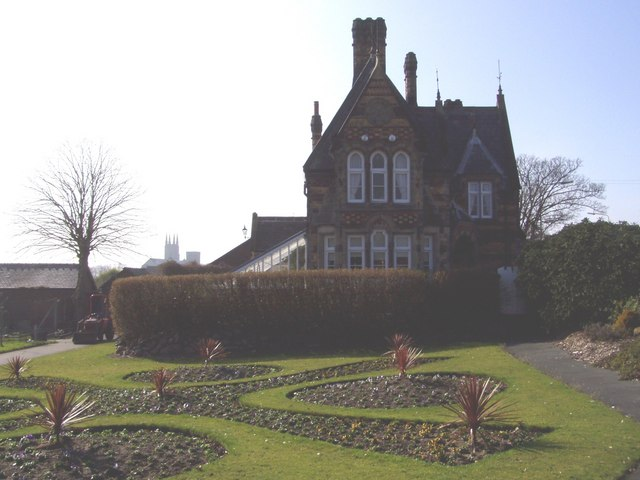
Cemetery Lodge, Bridlington 1874

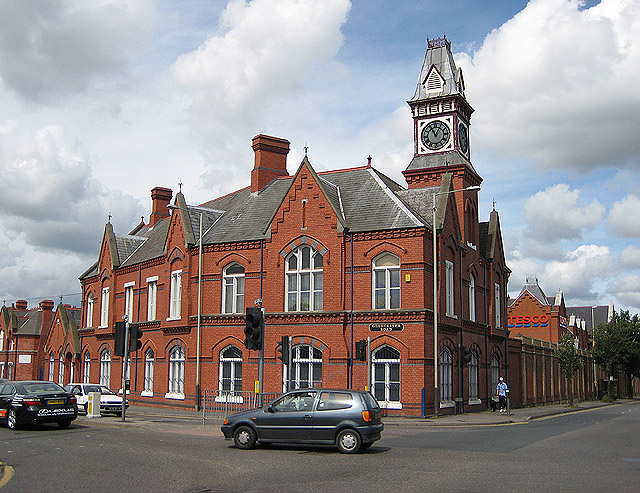
Cheltenham Gas Company offices 1881

Alfred Smith (born 4 August 1850) was an architect who worked in a variety of locations in England, including Nottingham and the Forest of Dean.

== Career ==
He was born on 4 August 1850 in Bungay, Suffolk, the son of Jessey Smith (b. 1826) and Jane Fish (1826-1900)

He married Susanna Anna Leeds, daughter of William Leeds of Reepham on 14 September 1872 in Christ Church, Radford, Nottingham and they had the following children:

- Alfred William Smith (b. 1875)
- Charles Edgar Smith (b. 1876)
- Henry Edward Smith (b. 1878)
- Francis James Smith (b. 1880)
- Percy John Smith (1893-1970)

He set up office in Bungay, Suffolk, but in 1874 he moved to Nottingham, By 1881 he was living in Mitcheldean, Gloucestershire and was architect to the Forest of Dean Schools Board. By 1891 he was living in Dedham, Essex and was described as a retired architect. In the 1901 he is recorded as a farmer in Westleton in Suffolk, but in 1911 he was living at 3 Lulworth Villas, Maumbury Way, Dorchester and described again as a retired architect.

== Buildings ==
- Church of St John the Baptist, Wellington, Somerset, reredos 1874
- Bridlington Cemetery 1875
- 10, Low Pavement, Nottingham 1876
- Bridlington Cemetery Chapel 1880
- Bridlington Cemetery Lodge 1880
- Gas Company Offices, Tewkesbury Road, Cheltenham 1881
- Steam Mills School, Cinderford, Gloucestershire 1881-82
- Joy's Green School, Lydbrook, Gloucestershire 1883
