= Rough =

Rough may refer to:

- Roughness (disambiguation)
- Rough (golf), the area outside the fairway on a golf course

== Geography ==
- Rough (facility), former gas field now gas storage facility, off the Yorkshire coast of England

== People ==
- Alan Rough (born 1951), Scottish football goalkeeper
- Katie Rough (2009–2017), British girl killed by a 15 year old girl
- Peter Rough (born 1983), senior fellow of the conservative US think tank Hudson Institute
- Remi Rough, English street artist
- William Rough (c. 1772 – 1838), English lawyer, judge and poet

== Entertainment ==
- Rough (manga)
- Rough (film), a 2013 film
- Rough (album), released by Tina Turner in 1978
- Rough (song), 2016 Korean song by GFriend
- Rough (creative group), Rough.Lab is a creative group based on Seoul.

== See also ==
- Roughs and roughing, in sports, especially in ice hockey
- Roughs, another name for Afghan biscuits in New Zealand
