= Haisthorpe =

Village in the East Riding of Yorkshire, England

Coordinates: 54.065151°N 0.278929°W

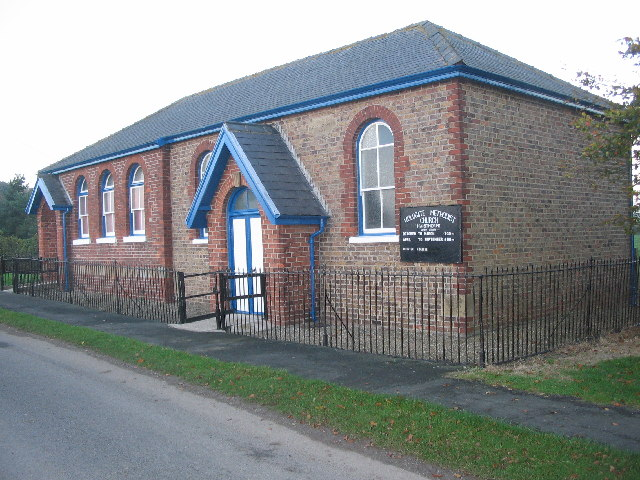
- Woldgate Methodist Church, Haisthorpe

- Location within the East Riding of Yorkshire
- OS grid reference: TA127646
  - London: 175 mi (282 km) S
- Civil parish: Carnaby
- Unitary authority: East Riding of Yorkshire
- Ceremonial county: East Riding of Yorkshire
- Region: Yorkshire and the Humber
- Country: England
- Sovereign state: United Kingdom
- Post town: DRIFFIELD
- Postcode district: YO25
- Dialling code: 01262
- Police: Humberside
- Fire: Humberside
- Ambulance: Yorkshire
- UK Parliament: Bridlington and The Wolds

Haisthorpe is a village and former civil parish, now in the parish of Carnaby, in the East Riding of Yorkshire, England. It is situated approximately 4 miles (6 km) south-west of Bridlington town centre. It lies on the A614. In 1931 the parish had a population of 127.

The name Haisthorpe derives from the Old Norse Haskelsþorp meaning 'Haskel's secondary settlement'.

In the village, to the north of the A614, is Grade II listed late 18th-century Haisthorpe Hall.

In 1823, Haisthorpe (then Haysthorp) was in the civil parish of Burton Agnes and the Wapentake of Dickering. The population at the time was 109, with occupations that included four farmers, a shoemaker, and a butcher.

Haisthorpe was formerly a township in the parish of Burton Agnes, from 1866 Haisthorpe was a civil parish in its own right, on 1 April 1935 the parish was abolished and merged with Carnaby.

== See also ==
- Listed buildings in Carnaby, East Riding of Yorkshire
