= Woodthorpe, North Yorkshire =

Suburb of York, North Yorkshire, England

Coordinates: 53.937430°N 1.127370°W

Woodthorpe
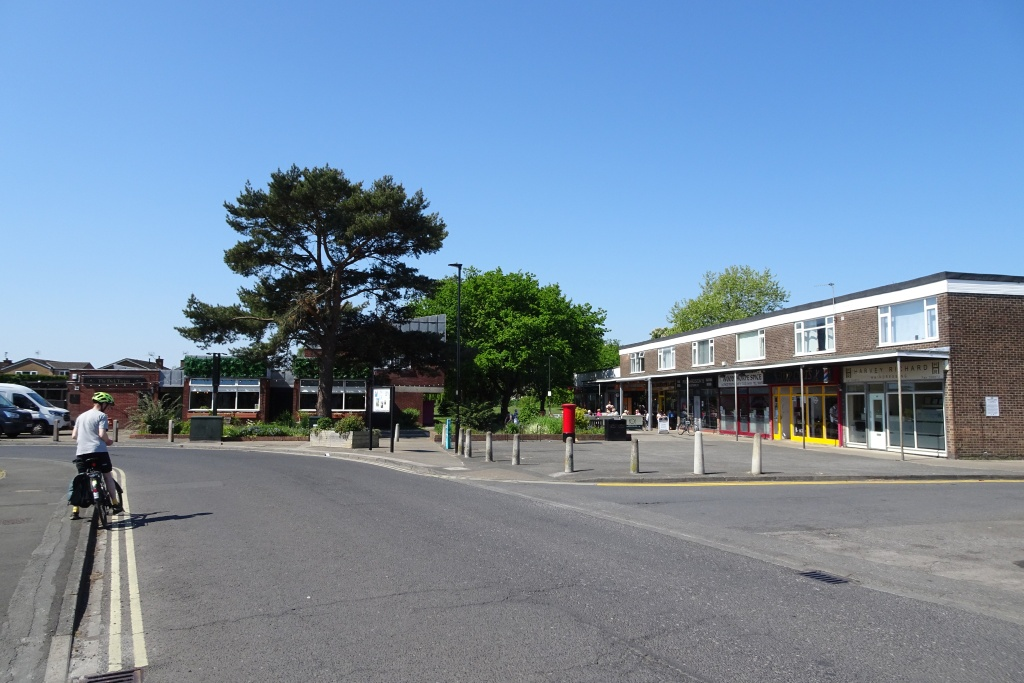
- Moorcroft Road Shops

- Location within North Yorkshire
- OS grid reference: SE573493
- Unitary authority: City of York
- Ceremonial county: North Yorkshire
- Region: Yorkshire and the Humber
- Country: England
- Sovereign state: United Kingdom
- Post town: YORK
- Postcode district: YO24
- Police: North Yorkshire
- Fire: North Yorkshire
- Ambulance: Yorkshire
- UK Parliament: York Outer

Woodthorpe is a suburb in the south west of the city of York, in the ceremonial county of North Yorkshire, England. The surrounding areas are Dringhouses and Foxwood.

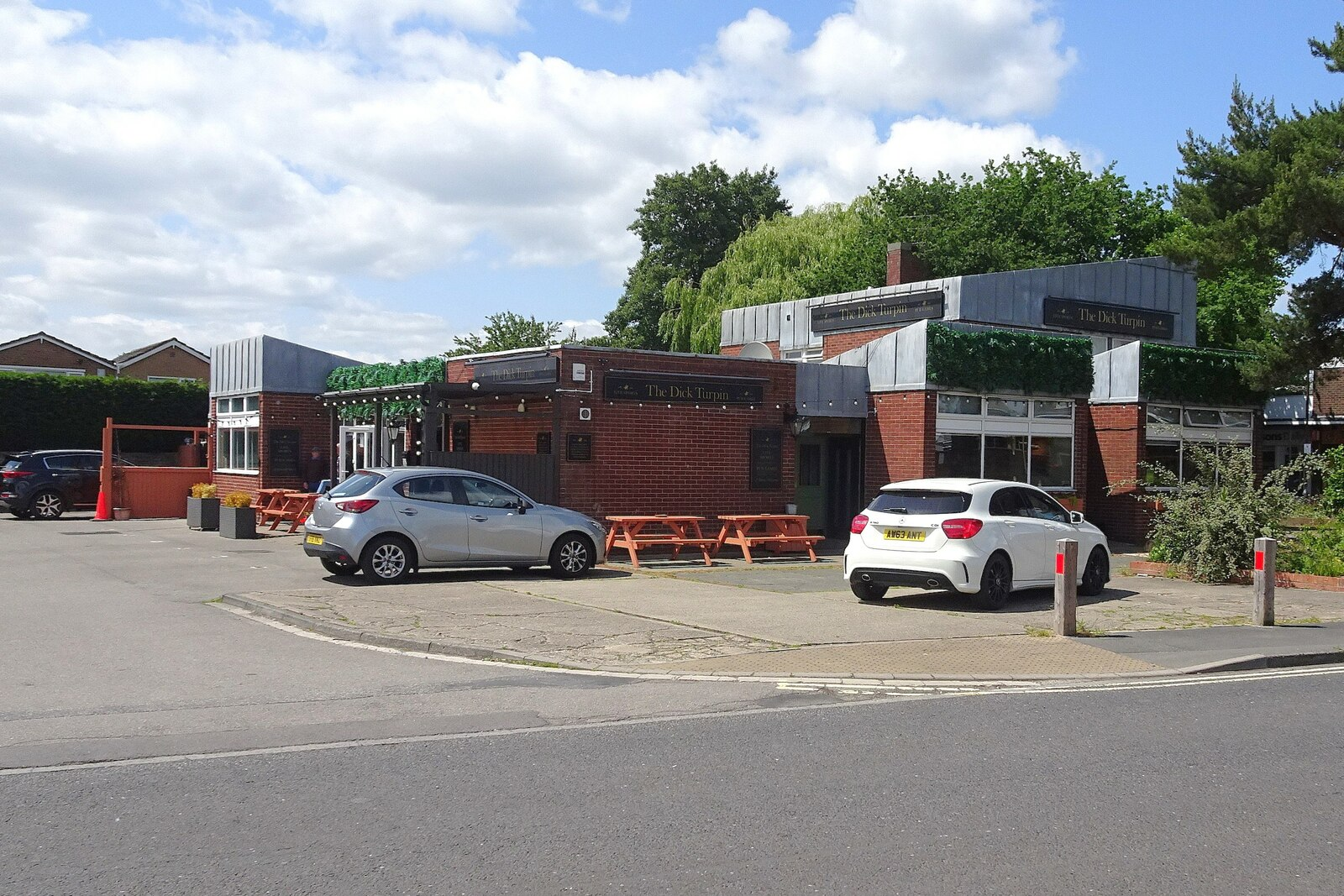
The Dick Turpin Pub

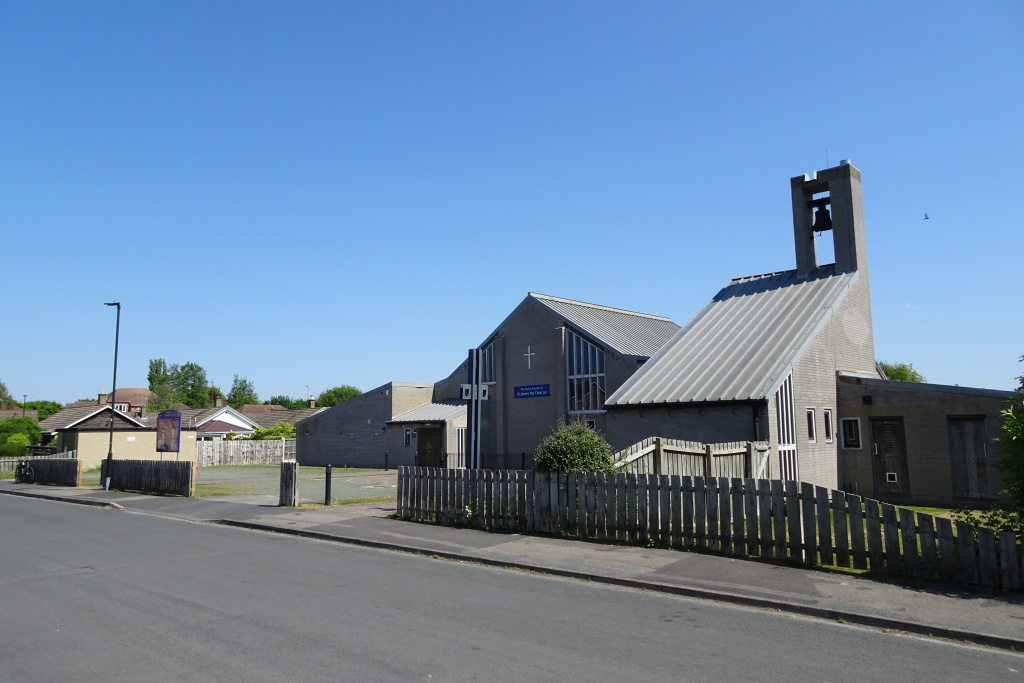
Church of St. James the Deacon

The area of Woodthorpe was built in several phases from the 1960s to the 1990s. The name Woodthorpe is believed to have been the name of one of the first large housing development projects around the Moorcroft Road and Acorn Way area and this name has stuck. Locally the name Woodthorpe is generally used for the areas south of Acomb Wood and east to Moorcroft Road and Acorn Way. To the east is Dringhouses, to the north is Foxwood, and to the west is Acomb Park.

In January 2017 the suburb made national headlines when seven year old Katie Rough was killed by asphyxiation and stabbed in the neck near her home by a 15-year-old female.

== Schools ==
The area has only one school, Woodthorpe Primary.

Pupils of secondary age usually travel to the new York High School, Tadcaster Grammar School, Tadcaster or Millthorpe School.
