= The Groves =

Area of the City of York, North Yorkshire, England

Coordinates: 53.967770°N 1.076660°W

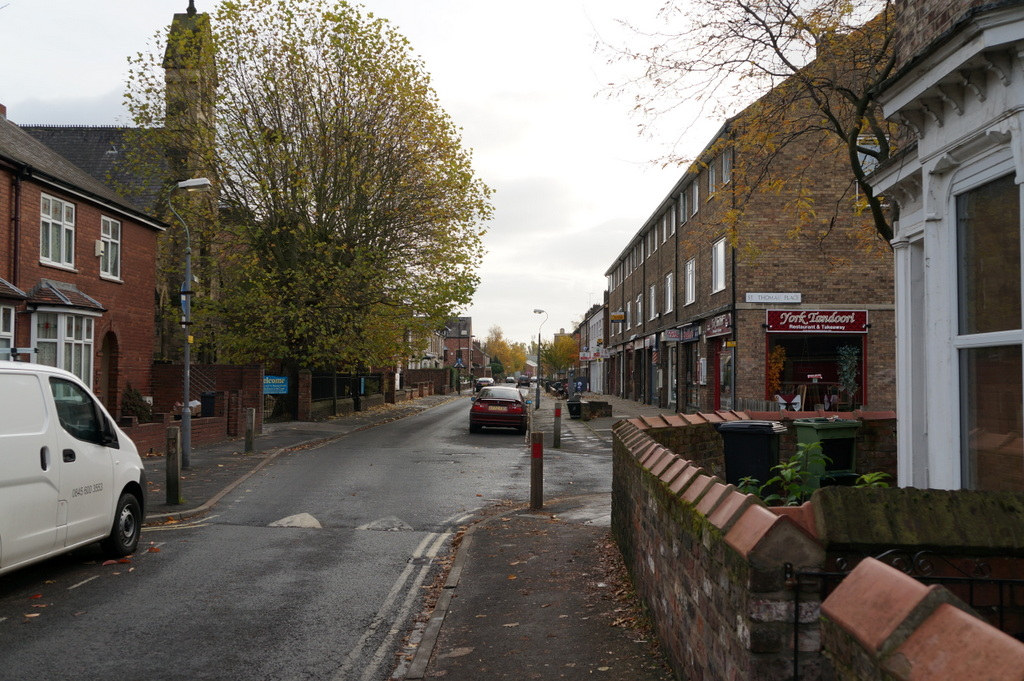
- Lowther Street

- Location within North Yorkshire
- OS grid reference: SE606528
- Unitary authority: City of York
- Ceremonial county: North Yorkshire
- Region: Yorkshire and the Humber
- Country: England
- Sovereign state: United Kingdom
- Post town: YORK
- Postcode district: YO31
- Police: North Yorkshire
- Fire: North Yorkshire
- Ambulance: Yorkshire
- UK Parliament: York Central

The Groves is a district of York, England, covering the area just north of the city centre between Huntington Road and Haxby Road.

The district is near York Hospital and the city ring road. In the 19th century the area was populated by poor working-class inhabitants of long rows of back-to-back houses. It consists largely of close-knit terraces, the majority of which date from the first two decades of the 20th century. In the early 1960s, a large number of very small terraced houses were demolished to make way for flats and maisonettes which were built between Garden Street, Penleys Grove/Townend Street and Lowther Street; this area has a residents' association.

The Groves area contains a mixture of privately owned and rented properties, and council housing, and contains a number of students from York St John University. Lowther Street is the main area for local shopping, with an Indian restaurant and takeaway, Chinese takeaway, a small supermarket and a shop specialising in Polish food. In Penleys Grove Street there is a grocery shop.

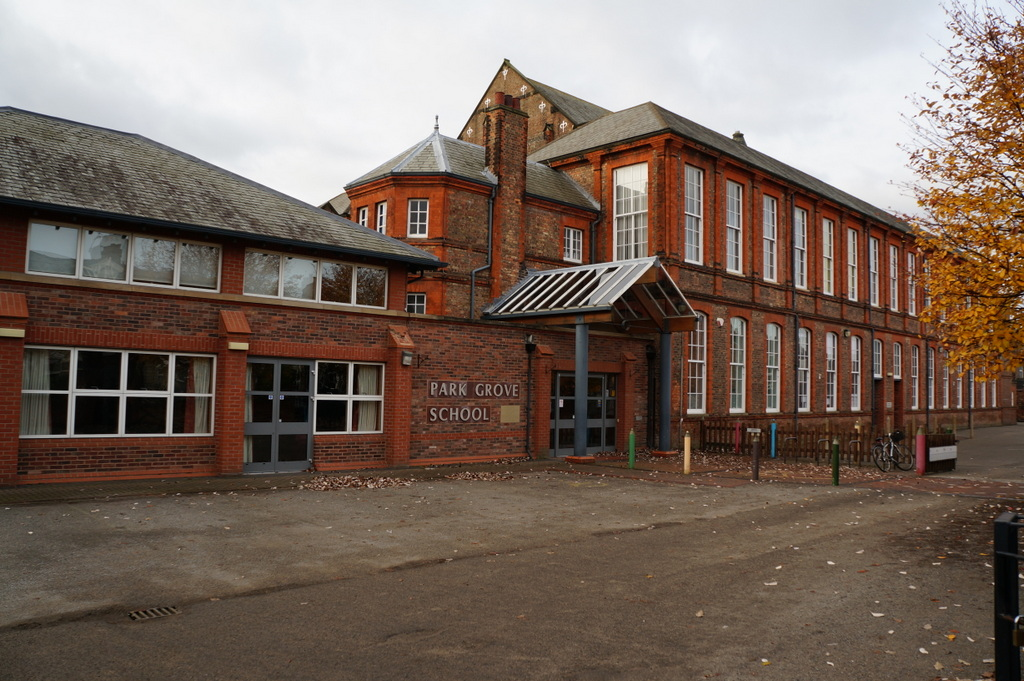
Park Grove School

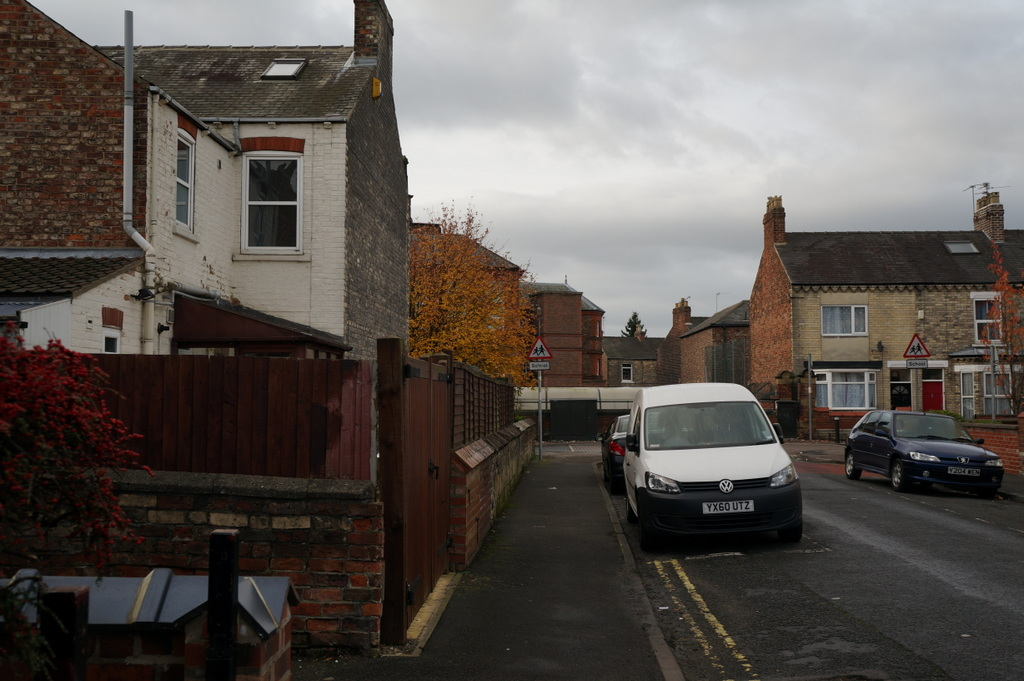
Emerald Street towards Park Grove

Lowther Street has historically been a busy route for traffic during rush hour, however in 2020 traffic has been re-routed away from Lowther Street through an 18-month experimental low traffic trial run by York Council based on feedback from residents of the Groves who desire "better air quality," "less and slower traffic" and "the chance to build on the existing sense of community."

The Groves includes Park Grove Primary School, the Young Groves centre, Door 84, and St Thomas' Church.

There is a police team which works with the community. In 2015 a ban on drinking alcohol on the streets was introduced to reduce anti-social behavior in the Groves. The area crime rate is one of the lowest in York.
