= Wilsthorpe, East Riding of Yorkshire =

Hamlet in the East Riding of Yorkshire, England

Coordinates: 54.059632°N 0.214831°W

Wilsthorpe
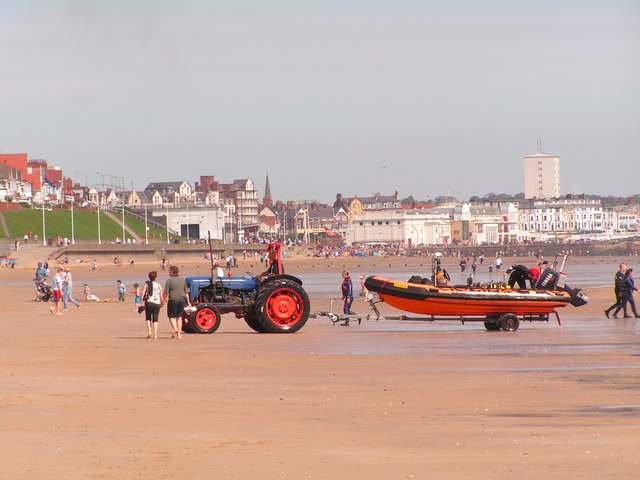
- Wilsthorpe sands

- Location within the East Riding of Yorkshire
- OS grid reference: TA169641
- Civil parish: Carnaby
- Unitary authority: East Riding of Yorkshire
- Ceremonial county: East Riding of Yorkshire
- Region: Yorkshire and the Humber
- Country: England
- Sovereign state: United Kingdom
- Post town: BRIDLINGTON
- Postcode district: YO15
- Dialling code: 01262
- Police: Humberside
- Fire: Humberside
- Ambulance: Yorkshire
- UK Parliament: Bridlington and The Wolds

Wilsthorpe is a hamlet in the civil parish of Carnaby, in the East Riding of Yorkshire, England. It is situated on the coast just off the A165 road and approximately 2 miles (3.2 km) south of Bridlington.

The name Wilsthorpe derives from the Old English personal name Wifel, and the Old Norse þorp meaning 'secondary settlement'.

In 2009 the East Riding of Yorkshire Council constructed a new 150 place secure boat compound at Wilsthorpe to replace an existing facility at South Shore, Bridlington. This is a first step in creating an integrated transport facility for Bridlington. As part of the first phase, access to the hamlet was improved by the addition of a roundabout on the A165 (now A1038) which also provided access to a new park and ride facility on South Shore adjacent to the hamlet.

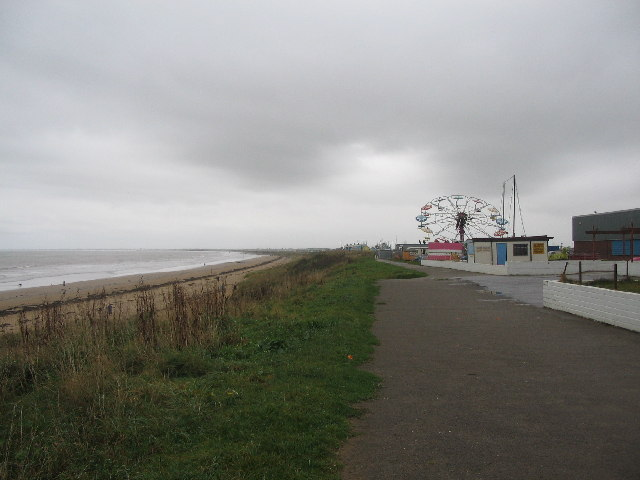
Cliffs at Wilsthorpe

== History ==
Wilsthorpe was formerly a township in the parish of Bridlington, in 1866 Wilsthorpe became a separate civil parish, on 1 October 1896 the parish was abolished to form Fraisthorpe with Auburn and Wilsthorpe. In 1891 the parish had a population of 16.
