= St John the Baptist's Church, Carnaby =

Church in Carnaby, East Riding of Yorkshire, England

Coordinates: 54°04′25″N 0°15′08″W

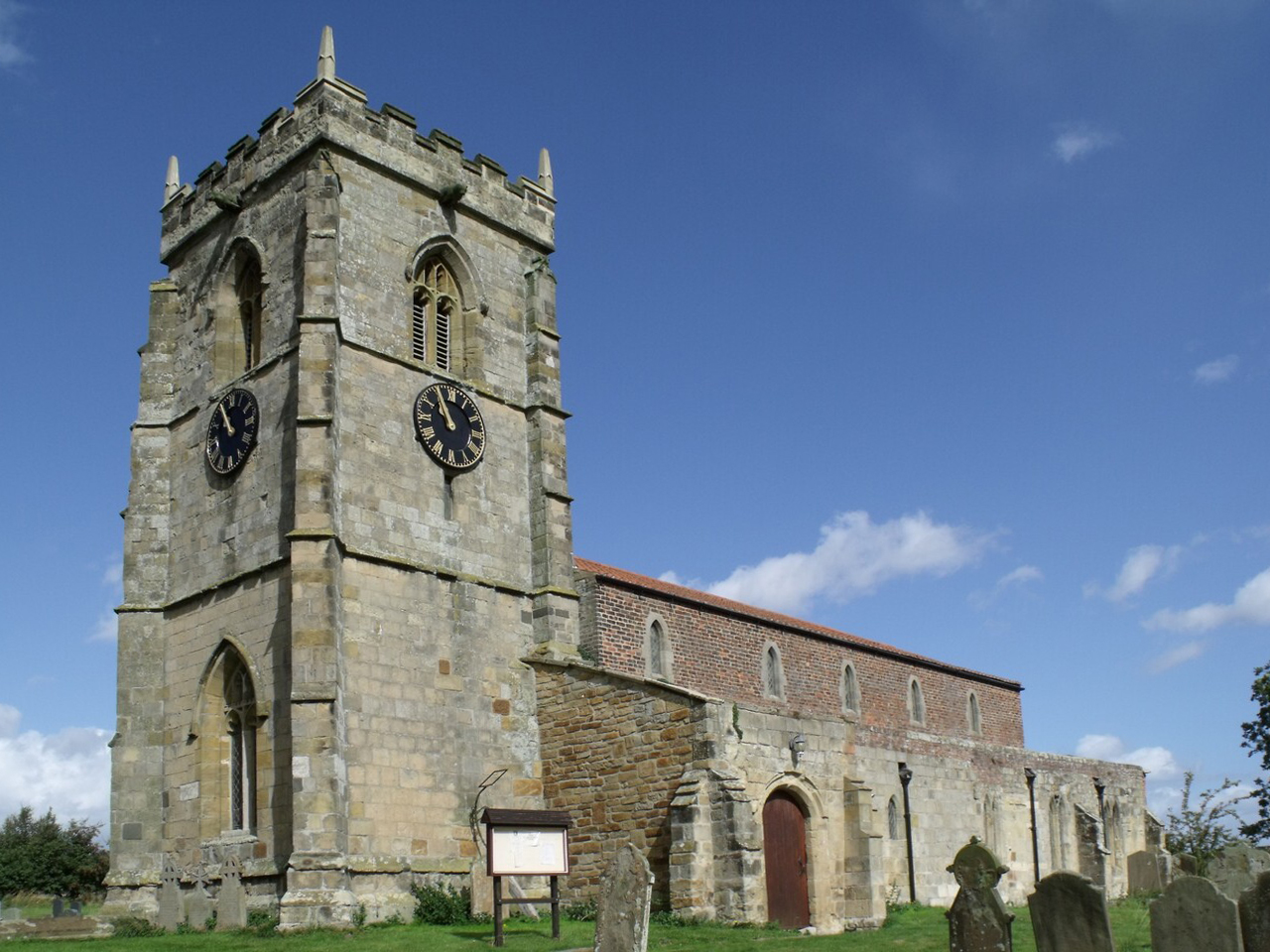
The church, in 2011

St John the Baptist's Church is the parish church of Carnaby, East Riding of Yorkshire, a village in England.

The church was built around 1300, from which period the south aisle and part of the tower survive. The tower was heightened in the 15th century, then around 1700 the chancel was rebuilt. In the early or mid 18th century the nave was rebuilt, then the building was restored between 1892 and 1893 by Richard George Smith and Frederick Stead Brodrick. The church was again restored in about 1986. The building has been grade II* listed since 1966.

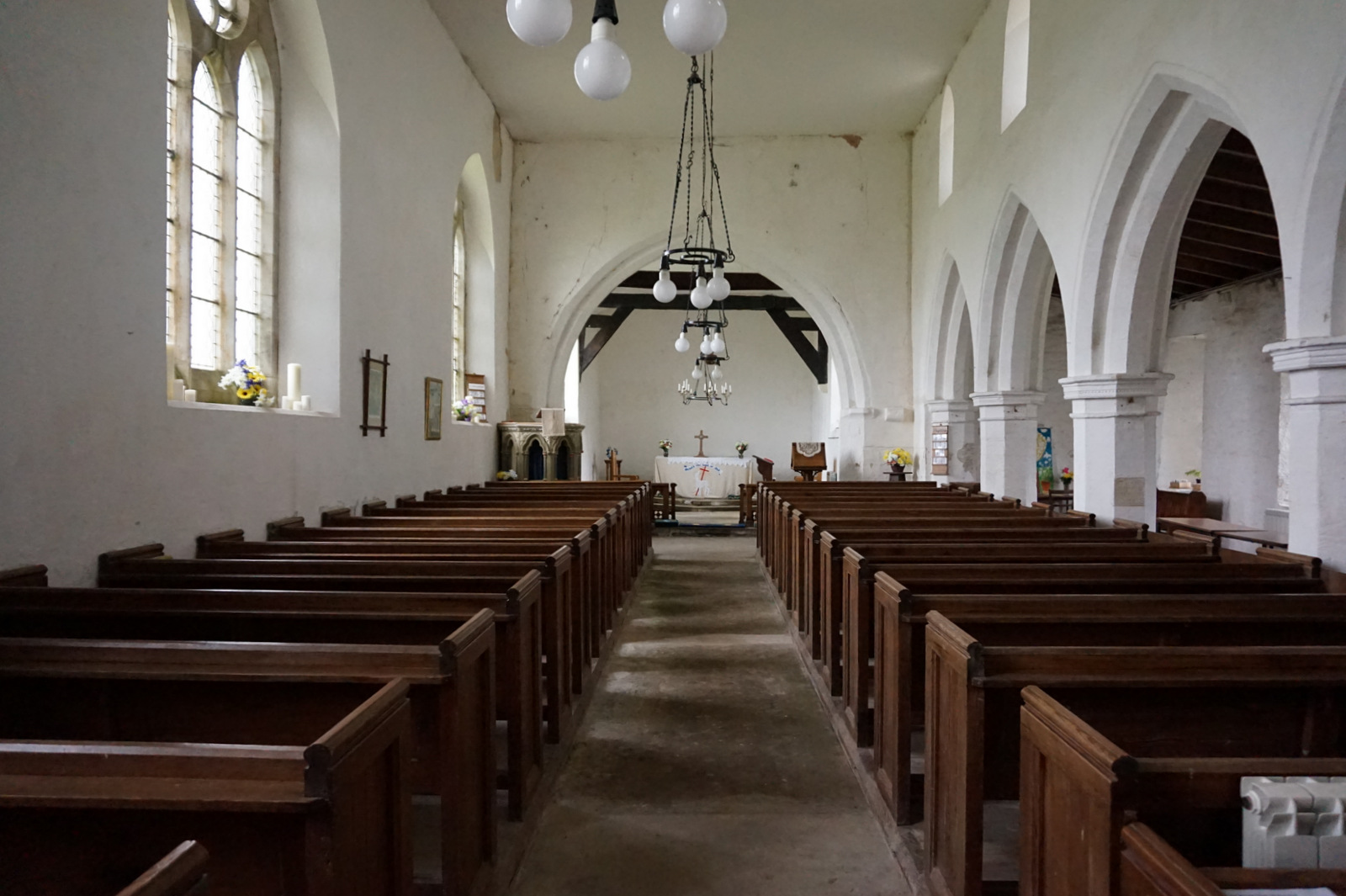
View east inside the church

The tower is built of magnesian limestone, and the rest of the church is pinkish-red brick and limestone, and it has a pantile roof. The church consists of a nave with a south clerestory, a south aisle, a chancel and a west tower. The tower has three stages, a chamfered plinth, angle and diagonal buttresses, a northwest stairwell, and a two-light pointed west window with a hood mould. Above are a slit window, clock faces, two-light bell openings with hood moulds, and an embattled parapet with corner pinnacles. Inside, there is a 12th-century drum font, decorated with stars, lozenges and chevrons.

== See also ==
- Grade II* listed buildings in the East Riding of Yorkshire
- Listed buildings in Carnaby, East Riding of Yorkshire
