= Carnaby, East Riding of Yorkshire =

Village and civil parish in the East Riding of Yorkshire, England

Coordinates: 54°04′20″N 0°14′56″W

Carnaby
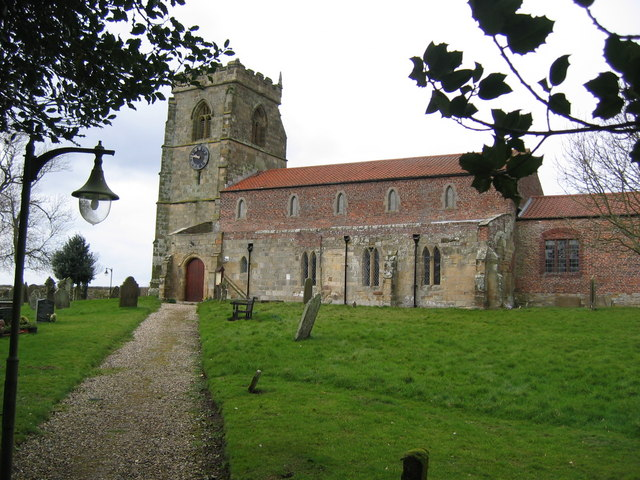
- St John the Baptist's Church, Carnaby

- Location within the East Riding of Yorkshire
- Population: 415 (2011 census)
- OS grid reference: TA147655
  - London: 175 mi (282 km) S
- Civil parish: Carnaby
- Unitary authority: East Riding of Yorkshire
- Ceremonial county: East Riding of Yorkshire
- Region: Yorkshire and the Humber
- Country: England
- Sovereign state: United Kingdom
- Post town: BRIDLINGTON
- Postcode district: YO15, YO16
- Dialling code: 01262
- Police: Humberside
- Fire: Humberside
- Ambulance: Yorkshire
- UK Parliament: Bridlington and The Wolds

Carnaby is a small village and civil parish on the A614 road in the East Riding of Yorkshire, England. It is situated approximately 2 miles (3 km) south-west of Bridlington town centre.

The civil parish is formed by the villages of Carnaby and Haisthorpe and the hamlet of Wilsthorpe. According to the 2011 UK Census, Carnaby parish had a population of 415, an increase on the 2001 UK Census figure of 300.

From the mediaeval era until the 19th century Carnaby was part of Dickering Wapentake. Between 1894 and 1974 Carnaby was a part of the Bridlington Rural District, in the East Riding of Yorkshire. Between 1974 and 1996 it was part of the Borough of North Wolds (later Borough of East Yorkshire), in the county of Humberside.

The name Carnaby derives from the Old Norse Kaerandibȳ or Keyrandibȳ meaning 'Kaerandi's' or 'Keyrandi's village'.

St John the Baptist's Church, Carnaby was designated a Grade II* listed building in 1966 and is now recorded in the National Heritage List for England, maintained by Historic England.

During the Second World War, Carnaby Aerodrome served as an emergency landing site for crippled planes. Specially built to cater for stricken aircraft, the airfield had an extra large runway, 9,000 feet (2.7 km) in length and 700 feet (210 m) wide. The airfield also operated a fog dispersion system, nicknamed FIDO.

After the war, the site was used to store Thor IRBM Missiles. The airfield finally closed in 1963 and is now an industrial estate, a large source of employment for the local area.

Carnaby railway station on the Yorkshire Coast Line from Hull to Scarborough served the village until it closed on 5 January 1970. However, people can still travel to Hull, Bridlington, Driffield and Scarborough by using the EYMS bus route number '121' that has alternative bus times.

In 1974, the Satra Motors Car Importation and Preparation Centre was opened at Carnaby, upgrading imported Russian built Lada and Moskvich cars for British showrooms. Although Moskvich had stopped importing cars to Britain by the end of the 1970s, Lada continued until July 1997, when it withdrew from Britain, sparking the closure of the Satra centre.

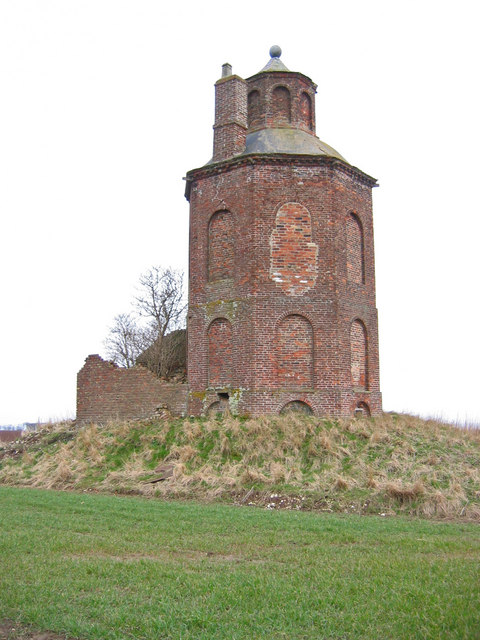
Carnaby Temple

Carnaby Temple, an octagonal folly stands in fields about 1 mile (1.6 km) north of Carnaby. It was built by Sir George Strickland, owner of Boynton Hall, in 1770 and is locally known as 'The Pepperpot'. The structure is based on the Tower of the Winds which is on the Roman Agora in Athens. In 1952 it was given Grade II listed building status.

== See also ==
- Listed buildings in Carnaby, East Riding of Yorkshire
