= Carnaby Temple =

Building in Carnaby, East Riding of Yorkshire, England

Coordinates: 54°04′59″N 0°15′25″W

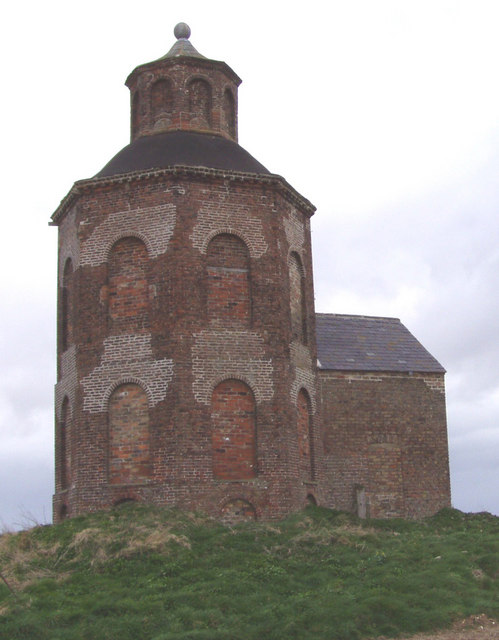
The building, in 2009

Carnaby Temple, also known as The Pepperpot, is a historic building in Carnaby, East Riding of Yorkshire, a village in England.

The building was constructed as a folly by George Strickland of nearby Boynton Hall. It sits atop a hill with good views of Bridlington Bay. The building was completed around 1770 and was probably designed by John Carr, its design inspired by the Tower of the Winds in Athens. During World War II, the building was used as an observation post. It was grade II listed in 1952.

The building is constructed of pinkish-brown brick, with a dentilled eaves band, and a bell-shaped roof in asphalt and Welsh slate. There are two storeys, a basement, and an octagonal plan, and a later rear extension. On each side on both storeys and the basement are blocked round-arched openings. On the roof is an octagonal lantern with similar openings, stepped eaves, and a pagoda roof with a ball finial.

== See also ==
- Listed buildings in Carnaby, East Riding of Yorkshire
