= Listed buildings in Carnaby, East Riding of Yorkshire =

Carnaby is a civil parish in the county of the East Riding of Yorkshire, England. It contains eight listed buildings that are recorded in the National Heritage List for England. Of these, one is listed at Grade II*, the middle of the three grades, and the others are at Grade II, the lowest grade. The parish contains the villages of Carnaby and Haisthorpe, and the surrounding countryside, and the listed buildings consist of a church, two follies, houses, farmhouses and farm buildings.

== Key ==
Grade	Criteria
II*	Particularly important buildings of more than special interest
II	Buildings of national importance and special interest

== Buildings ==
Name and location	Photograph	Date	Notes	Grade
St John the Baptist's Church; 54.07356°N 0.25213°W		Late 13th to early 14th century	The church has been altered and extended through the centuries, including a restoration in 1892–93. The tower is built in magnesian limestone, and the rest of the church is pinkish-red brick and limestone, and it has a pantile roof. The church consists of a nave with a south clerestory, a south aisle, a chancel and a west tower. The tower has three stages, a chamfered plinth, angle and diagonal buttresses, a northwest stairwell, and a two-light pointed west window with a hood mould. Above are a slit window, clock faces, two-light bell openings with hood moulds, and an embattled parapet with corner pinnacles.	II*
Carnaby Temple; 54.08322°N 0.25688°W		c. 1770	The folly is in pinkish-brown brick, with a dentilled eaves band, and a bell-shaped roof in asphalt and Welsh slate. There are two storeys, a basement, and an octagonal plan, and a later rear extension. On each side on both storeys and the basement are blocked round-arched openings. On the roof is an octagonal lantern with similar openings, stepped eaves, and a pagoda roof with a ball finial.	II
Fond Brig; 54.08901°N 0.25069°W		c. 1770	A folly in the grounds of Boynton Hall, carrying Woldgate Road over a former carriage drive. It is in the form of a Gothic bridge, and is mainly in brick, with some limestone blocks and architectural fragments. Below the road is a round arch flanked by abutment walls containing niches, one with a round arch and the other with a pointed arch. Above the road, on the north side, is a broad window with a two-centred arch and a stone sill.	II
Carnaby House; 54.07313°N 0.24722°W	—	Late 18th century (probable)	The farmhouse is in pinkish-orange brick, the front in painted stucco, with stone dressings, quoins, an eaves band, and a tile and pantile roof with stone copings, and brick kneelers. There are two storeys and three bays, and a rear range. In the centre is a fluted Doric doorcase with a frieze and a hood, and a doorway with a divided fanlight. The windows are sashes, those on the outer bays tripartite.	II
Haisthorpe Hall; 54.06853°N 0.27946°W	—	Late 18th century (probable)	The house was later extended, the main range dating from about 1850. It is in pinkish-brown and gault brick, with a Welsh slate roof. There are two storeys and three bays, the middle bay taller and slightly projecting and all gabled with decorative bargeboards, and at the rear is an earlier three-storey three-bay range. In the centre is a porch with doors on the sides, and the windows are sashes with hood moulds. Above the porch, and in each gable, is a blind quatrefoil oculus, and at the rear is a staircase window.	II
Hill Farmhouse; 54.07298°N 0.25015°W		1822	The farmhouse is in whitewashed stone, with stepped eaves, and a pantile roof with brick and rendered kneelers and copings. There are two storeys and three bays, and a range to the left with a single storey and attic, and two bays. In the centre, steps lead to a doorway in a wooden porch, and to the right is a dated and initialled plaque. The windows are horizontally sliding sashes. On the left range is a casement window and a roof dormer.	II
Manor Farmhouse; 54.06268°N 0.27662°W		Early 19th century	The farmhouse, which possibly contains earlier material, is in colourwashed stone and brick with a pantile roof. There are two storeys and an L-shaped plan, with a front range of three bays. The central doorway has fluted pilasters, a fanlight, and a hood, and the windows are sashes.	II
Cart sheds, pigeoncote and stables, Carnaby House; 54.07354°N 0.24709°W	—	Early to mid-19th century	The farm buildings are in pinkish-yellow brick, with red brick dressings and hipped pantile roofs. They have a U-shaped plan with three ranges around a courtyard. The main range has modillion cornices, and openings with quoined surrounds and flat aches of alternating red and yellow brick. The central bay has two storeys and is flanked by four-bay single-storey wings. On the central bay is a carriage arch, with a red brick quoined surround, above which is a square opening. The end bays contain cart openings, and the other bays have basket-ached openings. The front facing the road has a flat-headed doorway, and a round-arched stable opening with a keystone.	II
