= Our Lady's Church, Acomb =

Church in Acomb, North Yorkshire, England

Our Lady's Church
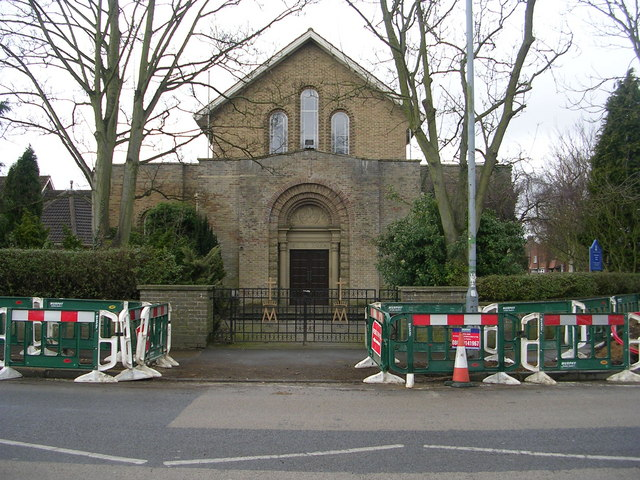
- The church, in 2010
- Our Lady's Church
- 53.94967°N 1.12888°W
- OS grid reference: SE 57270 50739
- Location: York, North Yorkshire
- Address: Gale Lane, Acomb
- Country: England
- Denomination: Catholic
- Website: www.ourladysyork.org.uk

History
- Status: Active
- Dedication: Mary, mother of Jesus

Architecture
- Architect(s): J. H. and Peter Langtry-Langton
- Style: Italianate
- Completed: 1955
- Construction cost: £28,000

Specifications
- Capacity: 400
- Materials: Brick

Administration
- Province: Liverpool
- Diocese: Middlesbrough
- Deanery: Central Vicariate

Our Lady's Church is a Catholic parish church in Acomb, a suburb of York, in England.

The first Catholic services in Acomb were held in the local high school, in 1941. A church was designed by J. H. and Peter Langtry-Langton and was completed in 1955. The construction cost £28,000, although an intended campanile was not built. On completion, the church could seat 400 worshippers. The sanctuary was reordered by C. M. Vis in 1970, and in 1999 the sanctuary was extended forward, the altar rails removed, and an octagonal parish room was added on the north side.

The church is in the form of an early Christian basilica, consisting of a narthex, nave, aisles, and sanctuary with chapels. It is built of grey brick, with a Roman pantile roof. The main entrance is in the centre of the west front, its bay projecting slightly. The doorcase is in the Doric order, and is within several brick arches, incorporating a panel depicting the Madonna and Child. Inside, the nave is supported by fourteen Corinthian columns, which are decorated to resemble marble. The east wall is blank, partly panelled with fake marble, with a large reredos above, including a crucifix and a dove representing the Holy Spirit. The altar and a statue of Our Lady were brought from St Patrick's Church, Hull, in 1999. There is an octagonal stone font in the baptistery north of the sanctuary.
