= Gateway Church, York =

Church in York, England

Coordinates: 53.9550°N 1.1247°W

Gateway (York) CIO
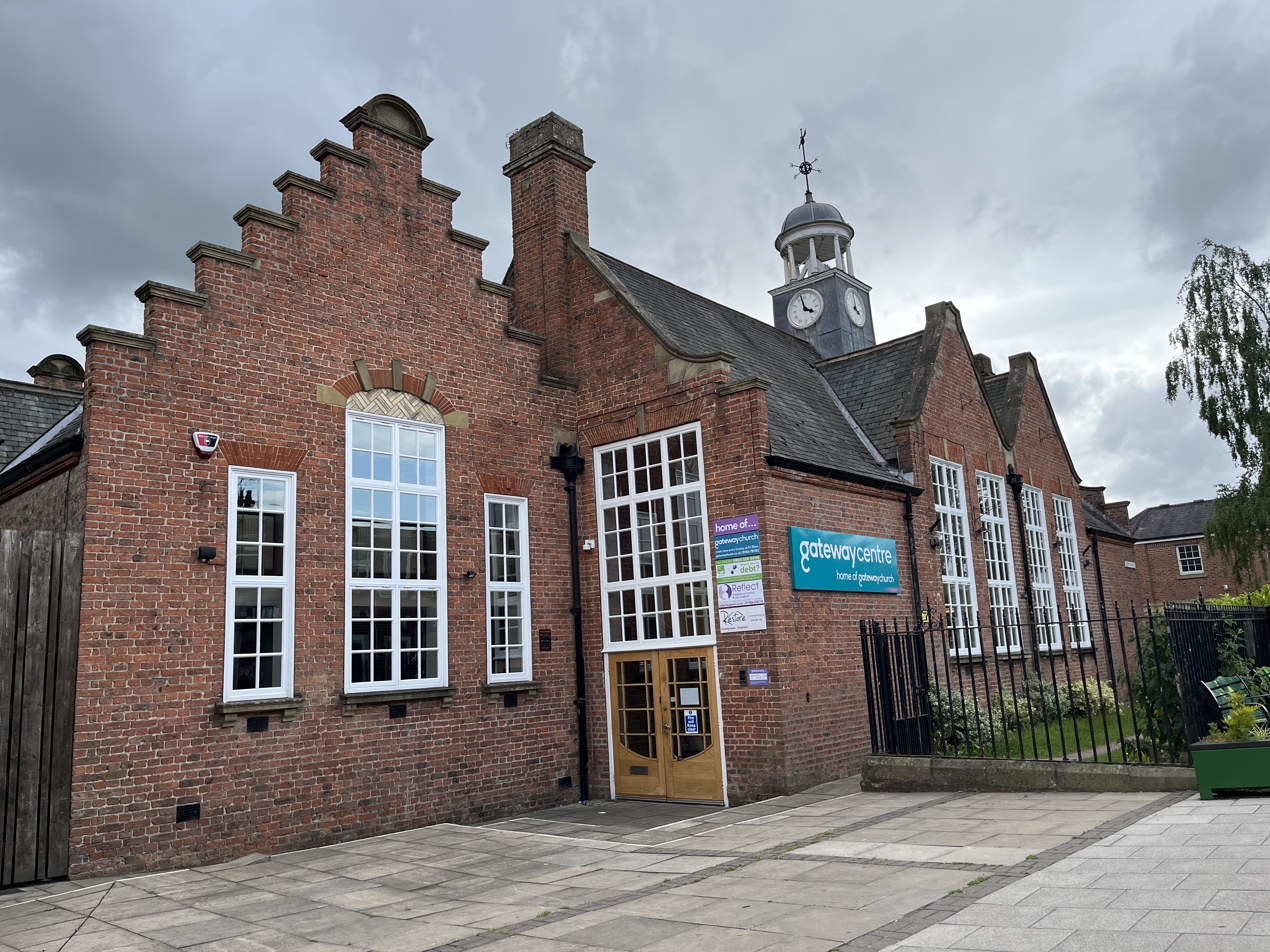
- The Gateway Church, seen from Front Street
- Founded: 1982 (as Acomb Christian Fellowship)
- Type: Christian Church
- Location: York, United Kingdom
- Website: www.gatewaychurch.co.uk
- Registered Charity number: 1165744

Gateway Church is a Christian church based in The Gateway Centre, Acomb, York, England. Formerly known as Acomb Christian Fellowship, it is part of the ChristCentral Churches family of churches, a part of the Newfrontiers movement of churches.

It has weekly worship services every Sunday morning at 10.30am at the Gateway Centre and encourages members to join a Lifegroup (small group) for community and fellowship. It adheres to the Evangelical Alliance Statement of Faith and operates under the legal structure of Gateway (York) CIO - a Charitable Incorporated Organisation.

The church was instrumental in the setting up of York Foodbank and runs a Christians Against Poverty free debt help service.
