= Killing of Katie Rough =

2017 child manslaughter

- Location: York, United Kingdom
- Date: 9 January 2017; 4:20 p.m. – 4:35 p.m. (GMT)
- Attack type: Child-on-child homicide by smothering, stabbing, manslaughter
- Weapons: Glove, Stanley knife (used post-mortem)
- Victims: Katie Sharon Rough, aged 7
- Perpetrators: 15-year-old female
- Motive: Unclear, allegedly due to delusions of Rough being non-human
- Charges: First-degree murder (dropped)
- Verdict: Pleaded guilty
- Convictions: Manslaughter on the grounds of diminished responsibility (24 November 2017)
- Sentence: Life imprisonment with the possibility of parole after 5 years

Katie Sharon Rough (16 January 2009 – 9 January 2017), a 7-year old English girl, died in the Woodthorpe area of her hometown of York in the United Kingdom, on 9 January 2017. She was killed by a girl aged 15 years old at the time, who handed herself in to the police immediately after attacking Rough. Under UK law, Rough's killer was considered a minor at the time of the killing, and so her name was not made publicly known in the subsequent investigation and trial.

Rough's killer pleaded guilty to manslaughter on grounds of diminished responsibility. It emerged that the teenager had been suffering from psychosis at the time of the attack, caused by an unknown psychiatric disorder and she was subsequently sentenced to a minimum of five years' detention on 24 November 2017.

== Attack ==
Katie Rough was last seen alive at 4:20 p.m. on 9 January, with a local resident subsequently reporting to have seen her and her eventual killer playing together in a playing field near Alness Drive, without any indications of the violent act which was to follow. Fifteen minutes later, at 4:35 p.m., the elder girl placed a 999 call and confessed to having killed Rough, though claimed not to remember any specific details of the event. The girl was then found by another local resident, Peter Mills, who subsequently found Rough's body a short distance away down a side street. Though attempts were subsequently made to resuscitate Rough, she was ultimately pronounced dead at York Hospital at 5:40 p.m., a little over an hour after the initial 999 report was made.

An autopsy of Rough's body revealed that she had been fatally asphyxiated, with a green glove later being identified as the weapon used to kill her. It was also found that wounds had been inflicted on her in the neck and chest areas with a Stanley knife, though it was determined that said wounds were not inflicted until after she was already dead.

== Aftermath ==
Around the time that Rough was officially declared dead, the 15-year-old girl was arrested and formally charged with her murder. Subsequent investigations found that she suffered auditory hallucinations and delusions and often experienced violent fantasies, which she acted out by mutilating and defacing soft toys at her home. It was also found that she was convinced that most of the people around her were robots disguised as humans. In the previous year, she had been taken out of school due to her mental state, and had engaged in self-harming since late 2015. It was also determined that the killing was a premeditated act, though it was uncertain whether the target was Rough specifically or if the attack was opportunistic.

Rough's funeral took place at York Minster on 13 February 2017. The service was led by John Sentamu, the Archbishop of York.

== Trial and conviction ==
Rough's killer entered a plea of "not guilty" to the charge of murder in the initial hearing at Leeds Crown Court on 16 February 2017. During the course of her trial, she received four further mental health evaluations which disagreed on the exact disorder she suffered from, but did agree that it affected her mental state up to and including the time of the killing.

Despite evidence indicating that the killing had been a premeditated act, the Crown Prosecution Service ultimately concurred that it was the result of the perpetrator's mental disorders, and offered her the opportunity to plead guilty to manslaughter on the grounds of diminished responsibility. She accepted the offer and changed her plea to "guilty" on the first day of her trial, 3 July 2017. Her defence counsel described her as an "extremely troubled and damaged teenager", and the judge ordered that the case be adjourned until 20 July, so that further psychiatric assessments could be made prior to final sentencing, though it was subsequently adjourned a second time until September. On 7 September she was given an interim hospital order to allow for additional mental health assessments, and on 24 November, she was "detained for life" and ordered to serve a minimum term of five years.

== See also ==
- Sharon Carr – Britain's youngest female murderer
