= Roughness =

Roughness may refer to:

- Surface roughness, the roughness of a surface
- Roughness length, roughness as applied in meteorology
- International Roughness Index, the roughness of a road
- Hydraulic roughness, the roughness of land and waterway features
- Roughness (psychophysics) in psychoacoustics refers to the level of dissonance
- The 'roughness' of a line or surface, measured numerically by the Hausdorff dimension
- Roughness/resel, the resel/roughness of an image/volume
- Unnecessary roughness, a type of foul in gridiron football

== See also ==
- Surface finish
