= York High School, York =

York High School
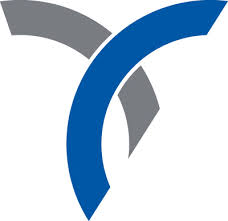

Location
- Cornlands Road; Acomb; York, North Yorkshire, YO24 3WZ; England; 53.948579°N 1.129237°W

Information
- Type: Academy
- Established: 2007
- Local authority: York
- Trust: Excel Learning Trust
- Department for Education URN: 144652 Tables
- Ofsted: Reports
- Chair: Patricia Miller
- Principal: Gavin Kumar
- Gender: Mixed
- Age: 11 to 16
- Enrolment: 757 as of January 2016
- Capacity: 991
- Colour: Royal blue
- Website: https://www.yorkhighschool.co.uk/

York High School is a mixed secondary school in York, North Yorkshire, England. It has a comprehensive admissions policy, and in 2016 had an enrolment of 757 pupils ages 11–16.

== History ==
York High School was established through the 2007 merger of Oaklands School and Lowfield School. The new school initially operated on the site of Lowfield School, expanded with temporary buildings, while a new school was constructed on the site of Oaklands School.

The name of the school was chosen after a vote by pupils at the schools and the local community. out of the options, York High School or West York.High School.

York High School has achieved positive Ofsted reports, and currently has a 'good' rating.

Between 5–6 a.m. on the morning of Friday 3 October 2008, a third of the school buildings on the Dijon Avenue site were burnt down in a fire. Students were given the day off and local residents were advised to stay away from the site. Students were given a week off school while staff and local authority officials put into place alternative educational arrangements for the pupils, and during this week many sporting and community activities were laid on. The school's headteacher subsequently credited the fire as the turning point in the school's journey towards greater success.

Subsequently, the Dijon Avenue site was closed and all pupils are in the newly built school. In April 2009 construction of its new buildings was completed, and the school relocated to Cornlands Road on the former site of Oaklands School.

Previously a community school administered by York City Council, in May 2018 York High School converted to academy status. The school is now sponsored by the South Bank Multi Academy Trust. The South Bank Multi Academy Trust was later renamed to the Excel Learning Trust on 17 July 2024.

It was announced on 13 February 2024 that Rod Sims would be stepping down from the position of headteacher at the end of the academic year, after 15 years in the role. On 22 May that year the school announced he would be replaced with Gavin Kumar who started as Principal in September at the start of the next Academic year. On 19 July 2024 the last "Message from the Head" post was made by Sims saying his goodbyes at the end of the Academic year. At the start of the following academic year Kumar started an equivalent "Principal's Weekly Post" where he similarly introduced himself.
