= YO postcode area =

Postcode area within the United Kingdom

York
- Postcode area
- Coordinates: 54.072°N 0.844°W
- Country: United Kingdom
- Postcode area: YO
- Postcode area name: York
- Post towns: 10
- Postcode districts: 37
- Postcode sectors: 161
- Postcodes (live): 18,600
- Postcodes (total): 34,239
- Statistics as at May 2020

The YO postcode area, also known as the York postcode area, is a group of 29 postcode districts in Yorkshire, England, within ten post towns. These cover most of Central and Eastern North Yorkshire (including York, Scarborough, Pickering, Selby, Thirsk, Malton, Filey and Whitby) and the northern part of the East Riding of Yorkshire (including Bridlington and Driffield). The rest of North Yorkshire is split between the TS, DL, LA, BD, HG, DN, LS and WF postcode areas.

Mail for the YO postcode area is processed at Leeds Mail Centre, along with mail for the BD, HD, HG, HX, LS and WF postcode areas.

In 1998, postcode districts YO2-YO6 covering the post town of York were given a second digit to overcome a shortage of available postcodes, and part of the YO1 district was moved into YO10. Some postcodes in the YO1, YO8, YO16, YO17 and YO25 areas were also changed.

== Coverage ==
The approximate coverage of the postcode districts:

Postcode district	Post town	Coverage	Local authority area(s)
YO1	YORK	City Centre	York
YO7	THIRSK	Thirsk, Dalton, Hambleton, Topcliffe	North Yorkshire
YO8	SELBY	Selby, Barlby, Brayton, Breighton, Bubwith, Cawood, Camblesforth, Drax, Foggathorpe, Thorpe Willoughby, Wressle	North Yorkshire, East Riding of Yorkshire
YO10	YORK	Fishergate, Fulford, Heslington, Osbaldwick, Tang Hall	York
YO11	SCARBOROUGH	Scarborough (centre and south), Cayton, Eastfield	North Yorkshire
YO12	SCARBOROUGH	Scarborough (north and west), Seamer	North Yorkshire
YO13	SCARBOROUGH	Scalby, Burniston, Cloughton	North Yorkshire
YO14	FILEY	Filey	North Yorkshire
YO15	BRIDLINGTON	Bridlington (south and east), Bempton, Buckton, Carnaby, Flamborough, Fraisthorpe, Sewerby, Wilsthorpe	East Riding of Yorkshire
YO16	BRIDLINGTON	Bridlington (north and west), Bempton, Bessingby, Boynton, Buckton, Carnaby, Grindale, Sewerby	East Riding of Yorkshire
YO17	MALTON	Malton, Norton	North Yorkshire
YO18	PICKERING	Pickering, Thornton-le-Dale	North Yorkshire
YO19	YORK	Dunnington, Escrick, Wheldrake, Murton, Riccall, Stillingfleet, Warthill	York, North Yorkshire
YO21	WHITBY	Whitby, Westerdale	North Yorkshire
YO22	WHITBY	Robin Hood's Bay	North Yorkshire
YO23	YORK	South Bank, Bishopthorpe, Copmanthorpe, Rufforth	York, North Yorkshire
YO24	YORK	Acomb, Dringhouses, Woodthorpe	York
YO25	DRIFFIELD	Driffield	East Riding of Yorkshire
YO26	YORK	Acomb, Leeman Road Area, Upper Poppleton, Nether Poppleton, Green Hammerton	York, North Yorkshire
YO30	YORK	Bootham, Clifton, Skelton, Linton-on-Ouse	York, North Yorkshire
YO31	YORK	Heworth, Huntington (South), The Groves, Layerthorpe	York
YO32	YORK	Haxby, Huntington (North), Wigginton, New Earswick, Stockton-on-the-Forest, Strensall	York
YO41	YORK	Elvington, Full Sutton, Stamford Bridge, Sutton upon Derwent, Wilberfoss	York, East Riding of Yorkshire
YO42	YORK	Pocklington, Barmby Moor, Melbourne, Seaton Ross	East Riding of Yorkshire
YO43	YORK	Market Weighton, Holme-on-Spalding-Moor	East Riding of Yorkshire
YO51	YORK	Boroughbridge	North Yorkshire
YO60	YORK	Sheriff Hutton	North Yorkshire
YO61	YORK	Easingwold	North Yorkshire
YO62	YORK	Helmsley, Kirkbymoorside, Nawton	North Yorkshire
YO90	YORK	Large offices in Rougier Street and Wellington Row in York (geographically in YO1) including the Aviva Building and 2 Rougier Street (former Aviva offices, now a Malmaison hotel).	non-geographic

== Map ==
YO postcode area map, showing postcode districts in red and post towns in grey text, with links to nearby DL, DN, HG, HU, LS, TS and WF postcode areas.

== See also ==
- Postcode Address File
- List of postcode areas in the United Kingdom
