= Saturday Market =

Saturday Market may refer to:

- Eugene Saturday Market, a weekly art and craft market in Eugene, Oregon
- Portland Saturday Market, a weekly art and craft market in Portland, Oregon
- Saturday Market at the Yupiit Piciryarait Cultural Center, Bethel, Alaska
- The U.S. title of a collection of poems by Charlotte Mew, published originally in England as The Farmer's Bride
- 11 Saturday Market, a building in Beverley, England
- 10–11 Saturday Market Place, a building in King's Lynn, England
