= Foresters' Hall =

Foresters' Hall is the name of:

- Foresters' Hall, Beverley, in the East Riding of Yorkshire, in England
- Foresters' Hall, Paddington, in Queensland, Australia

== See also ==
- Forester's Hall, in Pennsylvania, United States
