= 48 North Bar Without =

Building in Beverley, East Riding of Yorkshire, England

Coordinates: 53.8462°N 0.4375°W

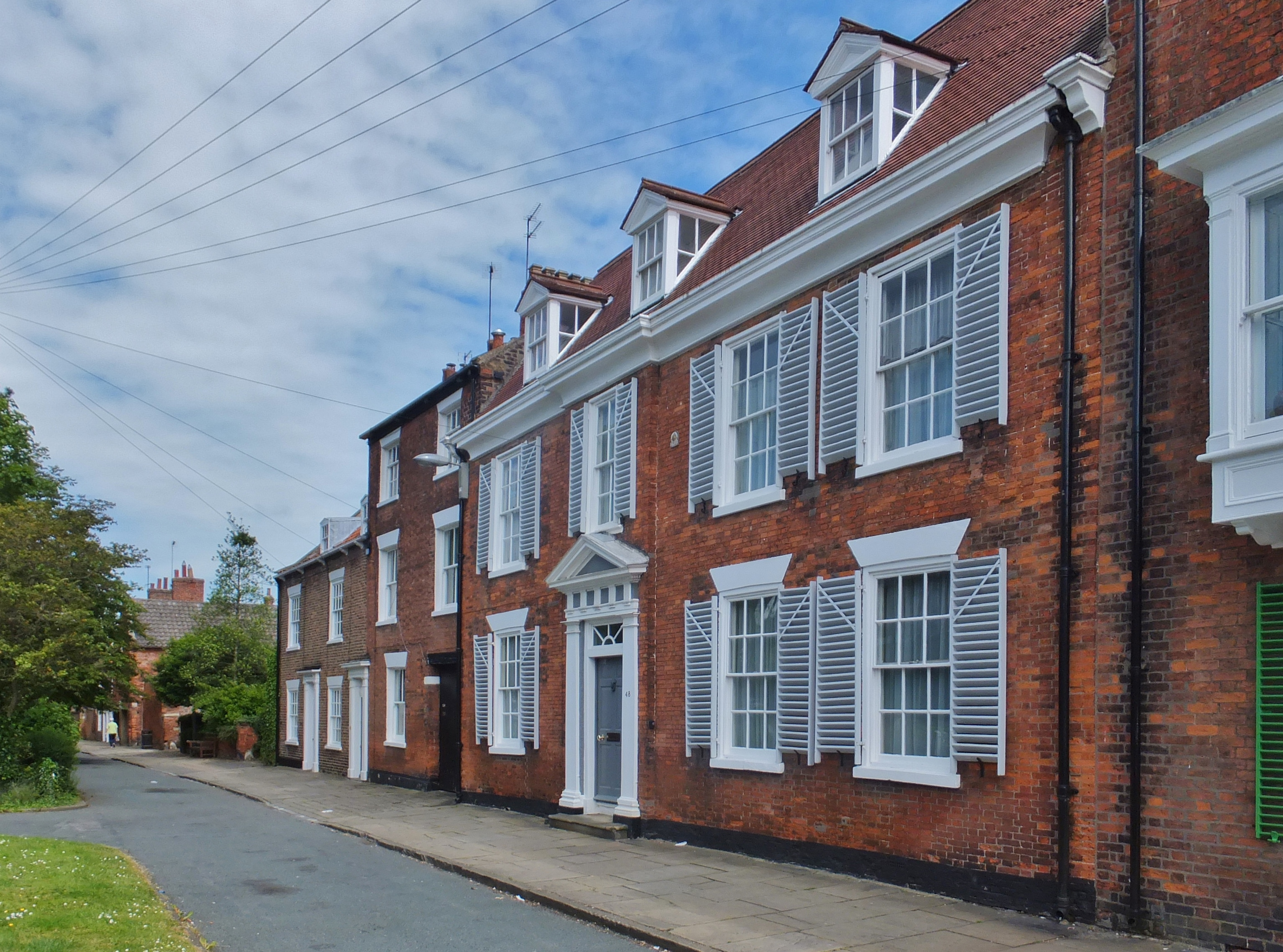
The building, in 2015

48 North Bar Without is a historic building in Beverley, a town in the East Riding of Yorkshire, in England.

The house was built between 1726 and 1734 for Ralph Featherstone. It is one of four grand 18th-century houses on North Bar Without, but the only one not set back from the street. It originally had six windows across, but was soon altered to have four windows across, darker patches of brick indicating the removed openings. The building was grade II* listed in 1950.

The house is built of red brick with a tile roof. It has three storeys and is four bays wide. The doorway has Doric pilasters, an entablature with triglyphs, an ornamental fanlight and a dentilled pediment. The windows are sashes, and there are three gabled dormers. Inside, the original staircase survives, and there is extensive panelling and a stone chimneypiece in a ground floor room. The house also has a fire insurance mark for Sun Insurance.

== See also ==
- Grade II* listed buildings in the East Riding of Yorkshire
- Listed buildings in Beverley (north area)
