= St Mary's Court =

Building in Beverley, East Riding of Yorkshire, England

Coordinates: 53°50′40″N 0°26′07″W

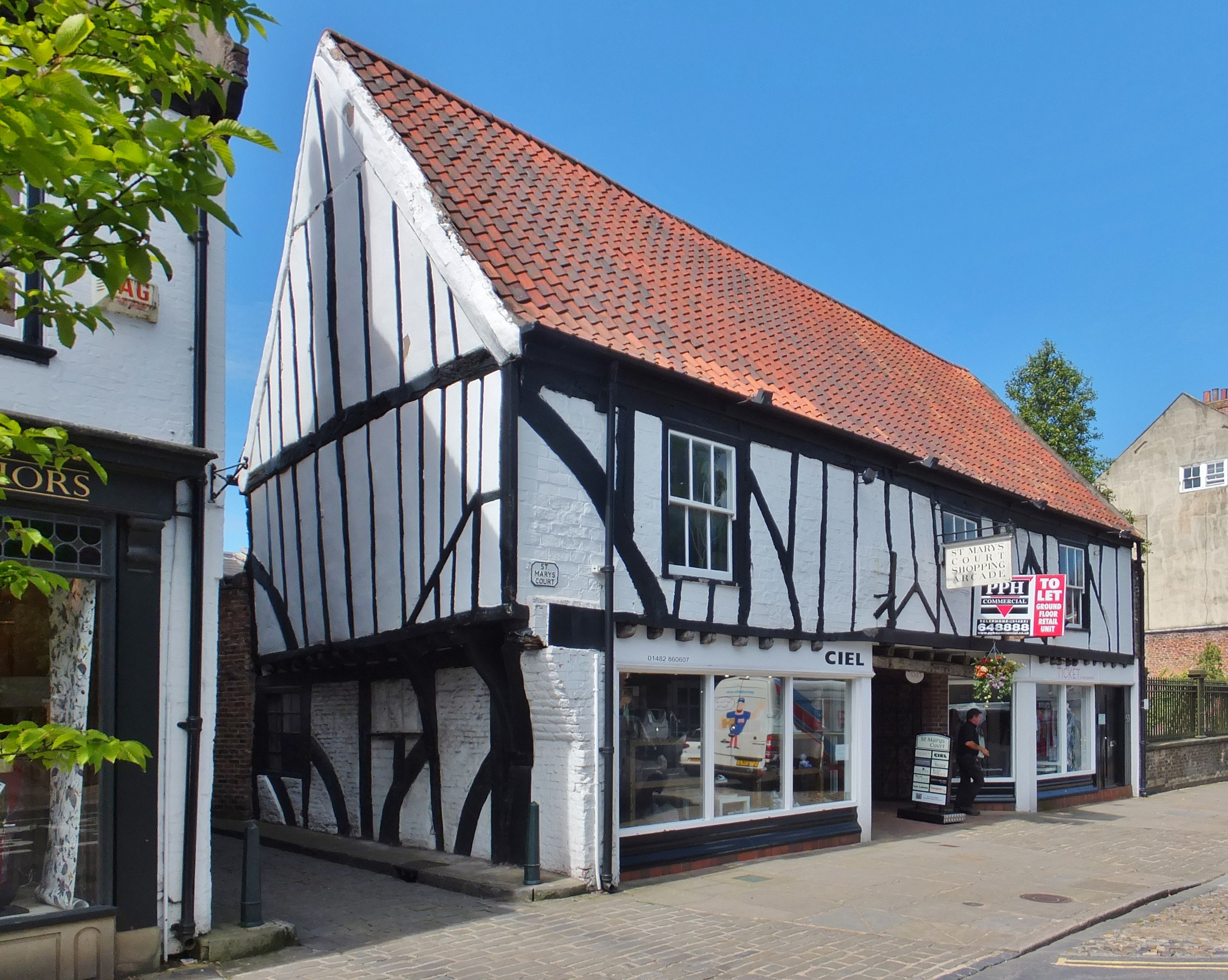
The building, in 2015

St Mary's Court is a historic building in Beverley, a town in the East Riding of Yorkshire, in England.

The building was probably constructed in the 15th century. The facade has been altered on several occasions, although the south end retains most of the original work. The building was grade II* listed in 1950. Nikolaus Pevsner describes it as the "best surviving timber-framed building" in the town. It has been converted into a small shopping centre.

The building is timber framed, with painted stone infill and a pantile roof. There are two storeys and three bays, the upper storey on the left return jettied. On the ground floor is an inserted modern shopfront, and above are two sash windows and one fixed light window. At the south end is a bricked-up mullioned window.

== See also ==
- Grade II* listed buildings in the East Riding of Yorkshire
- Listed buildings in Beverley (north area)
