= 46–50 High Street, Bridlington =

Terrace in Bridlington, East Riding of Yorkshire, England

Coordinates: 54.0932°N 0.2072°W

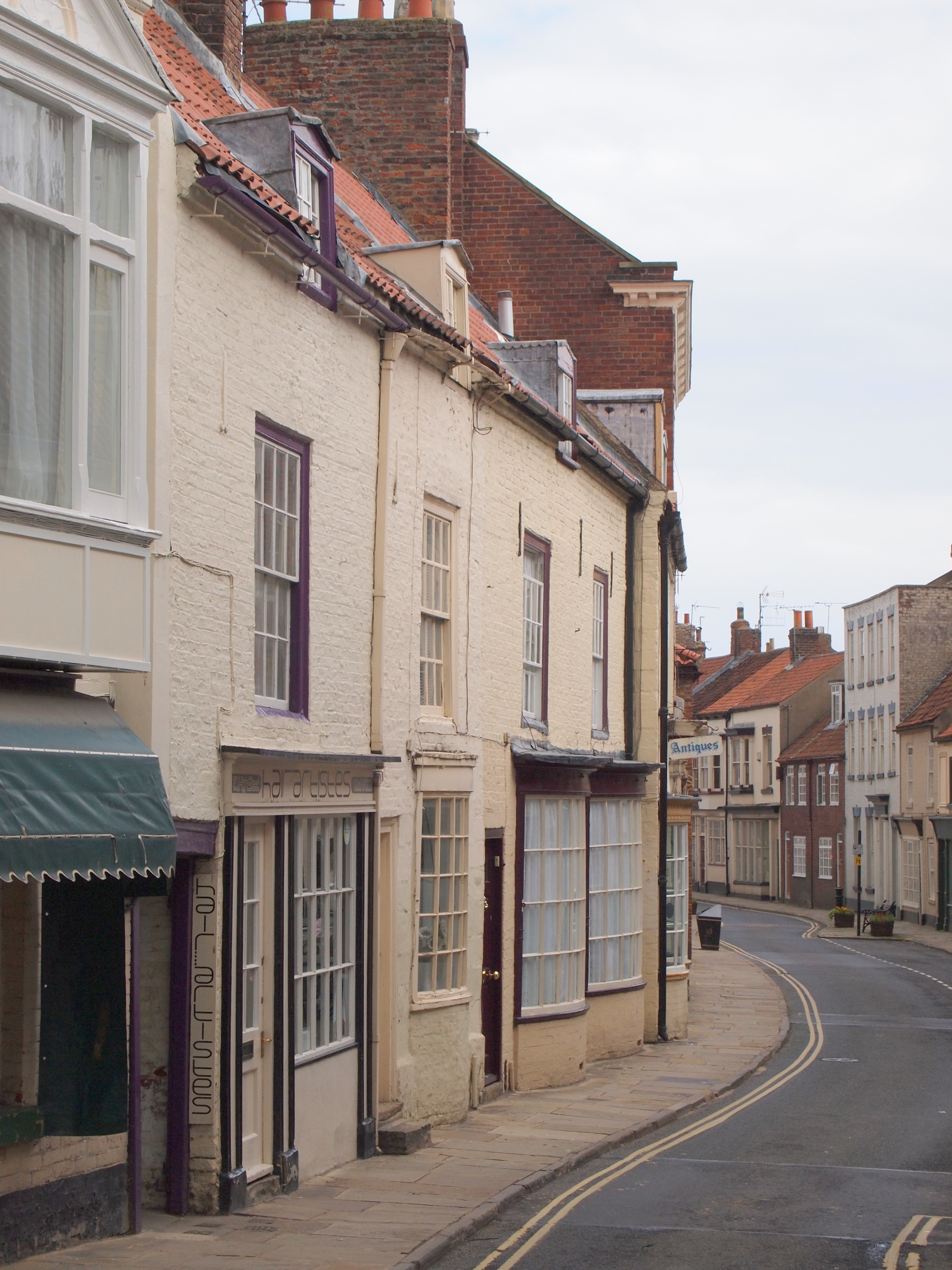
The terrace, in 2013

46–50 High Street is a historic terrace of buildings in Bridlington, a town in the East Riding of Yorkshire, in England.

The terrace was constructed in the 18th century, but it incorporates some mediaeval stonework. In the early 19th century, shopfronts were inserted on the ground floors of numbers 46 and 48, while the shopfront of number 50 dates from the 20th century. The terrace was grade II* listed in 1951.

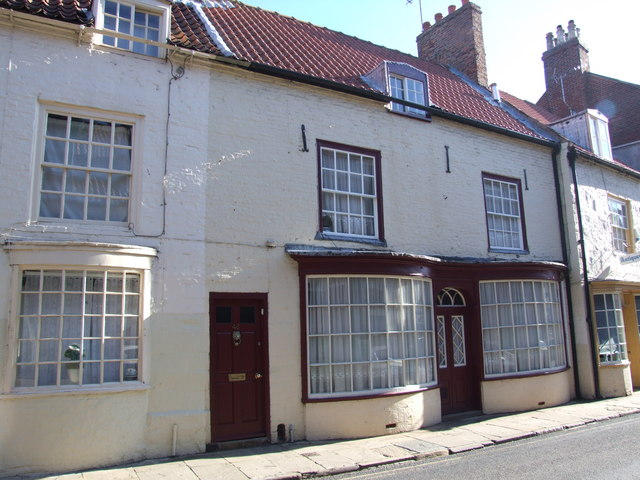
46 High Street, in 2010

Other than the mediaeval stonework, the buildings are constructed of brick. They are painted and have pantile roofs. Each has two storeys and attics, and they are four bays wide in total. On the ground floor of number 46 is a 19th-century shopfront with bow windows flanking an entrance, to the left are two doorways with the small-paned bow window of number 48 between, and further to the left is the modern shopfront of number 50, and a passage entry. On the upper floor are sash windows, and above are three gabled dormers with horizontally sliding sashes.

== See also ==
- Grade II* listed buildings in the East Riding of Yorkshire
- Listed buildings in Bridlington (Old Town area)
