= 18 and 20 North Bar Within =

Building in Beverley, East Riding of Yorkshire, England

Coordinates: 53.8437°N 0.4336°W

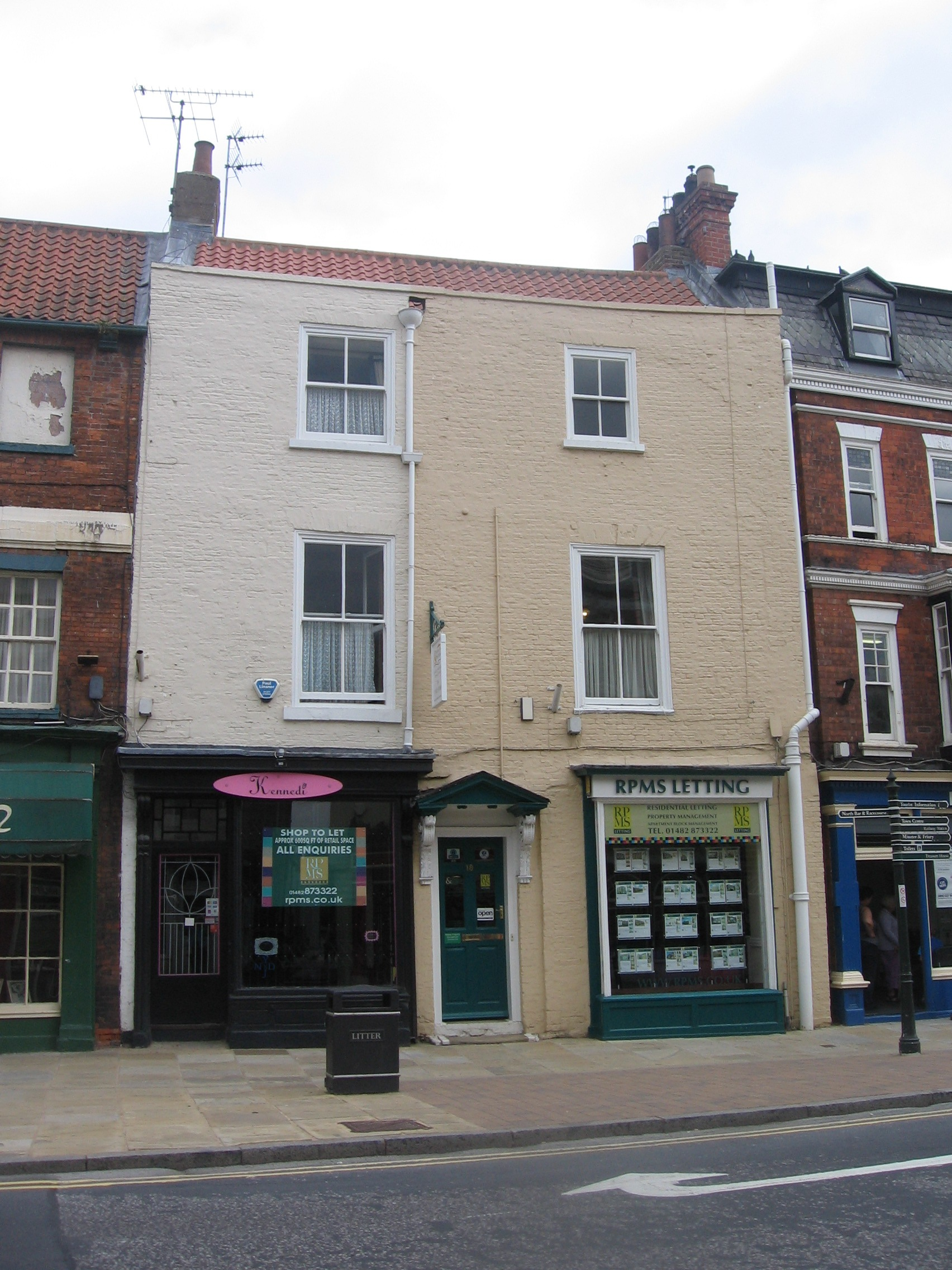
The building, in 2013

18 and 20 North Bar Within is a historic building in Beverley, a town in the East Riding of Yorkshire, in England.

The building was constructed around 1700, later becoming two shops. The division is not simple, with some rooms behind number 18 being part of number 20. Two shopfronts were inserted around 1900, that of number 20 being higher than that of the interior behind. The building was grade II* listed in 1950.

The building is constructed of painted brick, with a stone coped parapet and a pantile roof. There are three storeys and two bays. On the ground floor are two shopfronts, between which is a doorway that has an open pediment with rosettes in the soffit on boldly carved consoles. The upper floors contain sash windows. Inside, one room in number 20 has early panelling and a chimneypiece, while number 18 has one floor of its original staircase, and a recess containing an elaborate panel, possibly brought from Hotham House.

== See also ==
- Grade II* listed buildings in the East Riding of Yorkshire
- Listed buildings in Beverley (north area)
