= Keldgate House =

House in Beverley, East Riding of Yorkshire, England

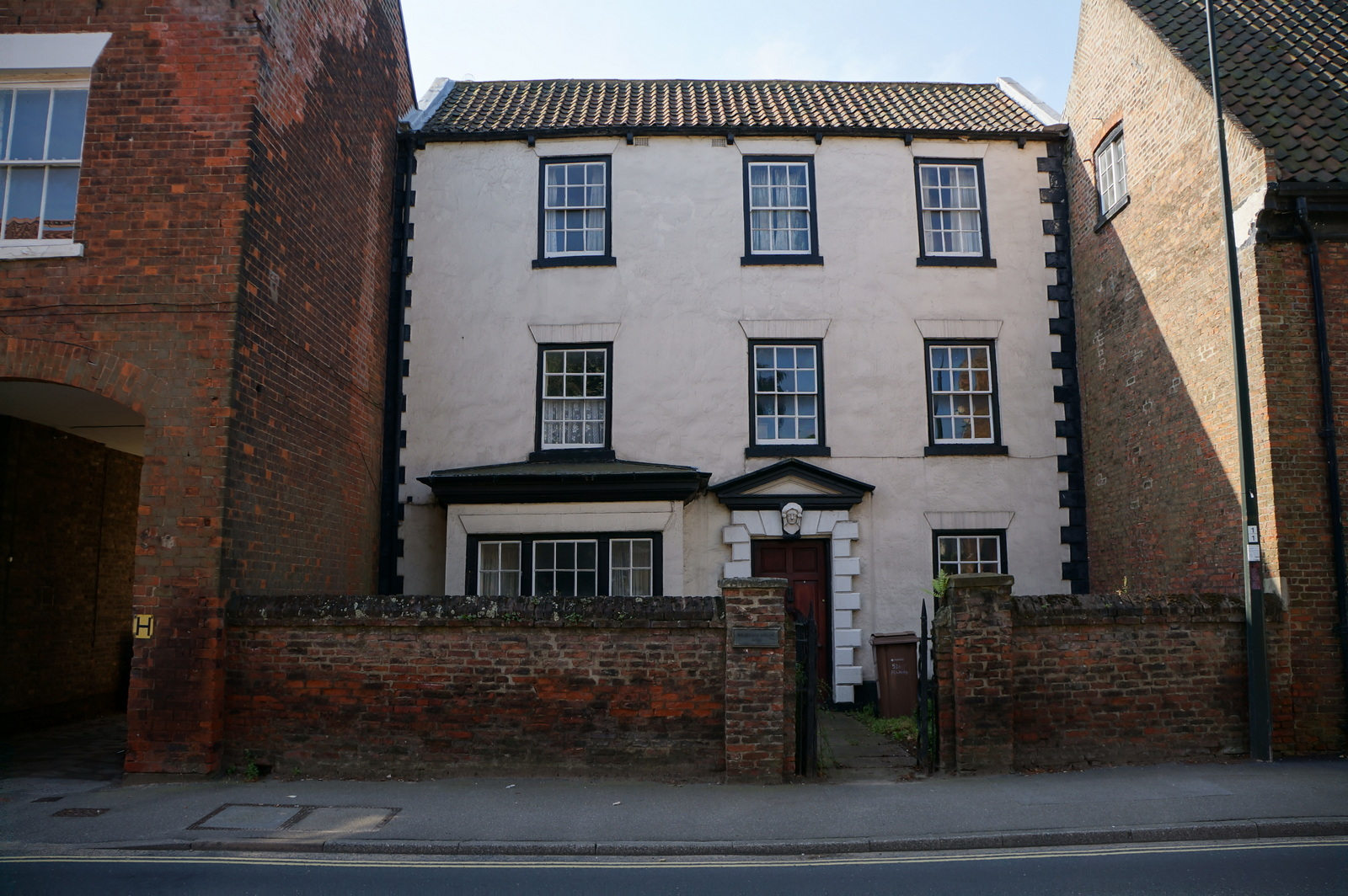
The building, in 2014

Keldgate House is a historic building in Beverley, a town in the East Riding of Yorkshire, in England.

The house was built around 1700. A large music room was added around 1740, which later became a separate property, and the doorcase was replaced at the same time. A bay window was added to the front in the 19th century. The building was grade II* listed in 1950.

The house has painted stucco, with rusticated quoins, wood spouting on moulded console blocks, and a pantile roof. There are three storeys and three bays. The central doorway has a rusticated surround, a keystone carved with a female mask, and a pediment. To its left is a square bay window, and the other windows are sashes. To the right is a projecting block in red brick, with one storey and four bays, and tumbled brickwork in the gable ends. It has a coved and beaded cornice, and the windows have flat gauged brick heads. The interior is finely decorated, notably the dining room with fine woodwork, and the original staircase.

== See also ==
- Grade II* listed buildings in the East Riding of Yorkshire
- Listed buildings in Beverley (west and southwest areas)
