= Monks Walk Inn =

Pub in Beverley, East Riding of Yorkshire, England

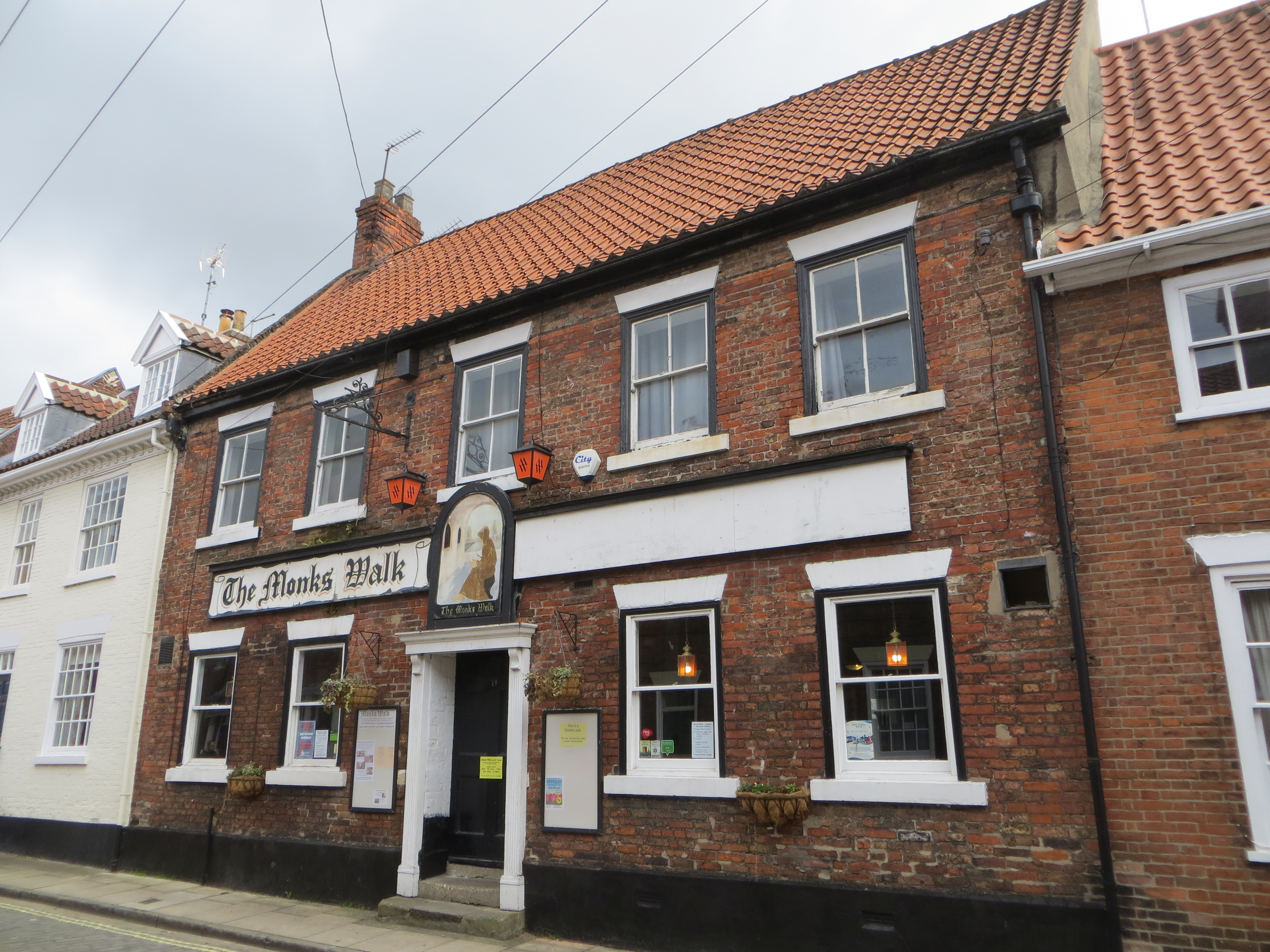
The pub, in 2017

The Monks Walk Inn is a historic pub in Beverley, a town in the East Riding of Yorkshire, in England.

The oldest parts of the building date from around 1260, while other timbers have been dated to 1420, probably representing cottages. The structure was largely rebuilt in 1671, as a house for the Wharton family. It later became an inn named the "George and Dragon", and the front section was rebuilt in the early 18th century. The building was grade II* listed in 1950. In 2000, it suffered a fire, but the damaged was repaired and it reopened the following year. In 2016, Neil Pickford left his job as a verger at Beverley Minster to become the pub's landlord. He died in 2018, following which his widow, Gill, took over and purchased the freehold. A local legend claims that the pub is haunted by the ghosts of monks, and that the sound of jangling keys can be heard.

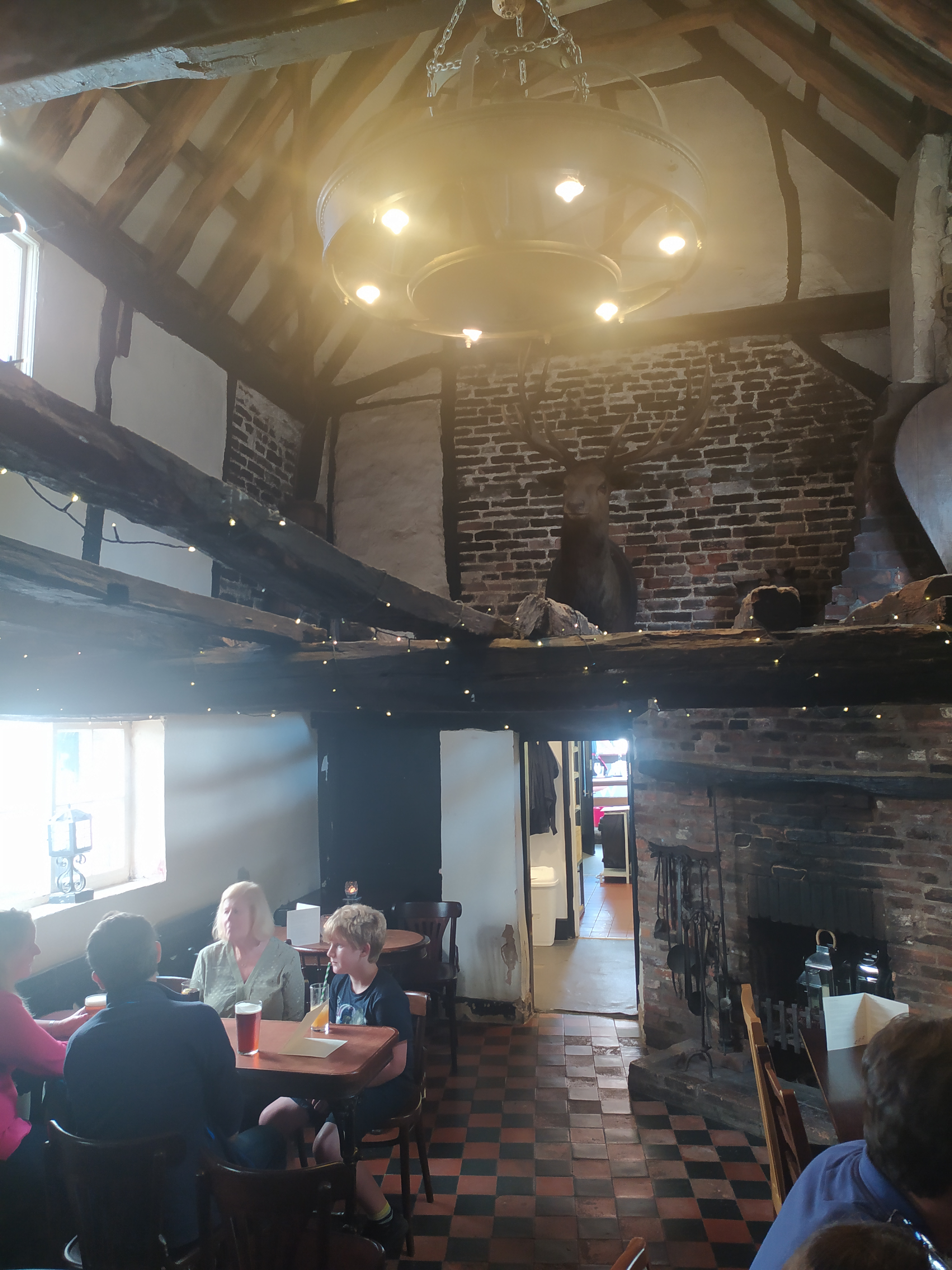
The half-timbered hall

The public house has a timber framed core, and is enclosed in red brick on a rendered plinth, with a moulded eaves cornice and a pantile roof. There are two storeys and five bays. The central doorway has fluted pilasters, and a cornice on consoles. The windows are sashes with flat gauged brick heads. Inside, there is exposed timber framing, a whitewashed brick wall divided into bays by Doric pilasters, and various pedimented openings.

== See also ==
- Grade II* listed buildings in the East Riding of Yorkshire
- Listed buildings in Beverley (south area)
