= 54 and 56 Toll Gavel =

Building in Beverley, East Riding of Yorkshire, England

Coordinates: 53.8416°N 0.4287°W

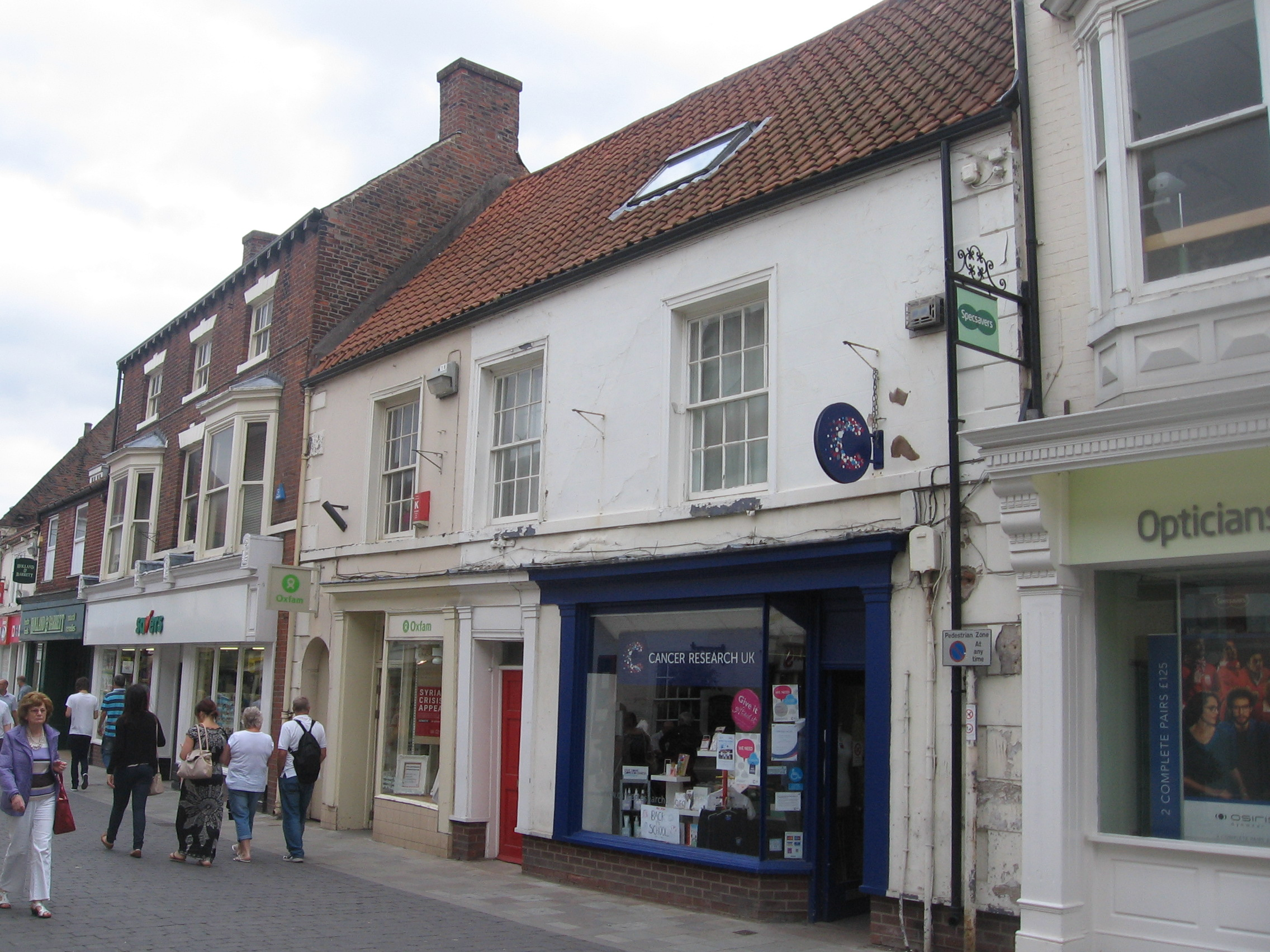
The building, in 2013

54 and 56 Toll Gavel is a historic building in Beverley, a town in the East Riding of Yorkshire, in England.

Nikolaus Pevsner describes Toll Gavel as "the most altered of Beverley's old streets". 54 and 56 is one of the oldest buildings on the street, dating from the late 17th century, with later alterations, including conversion into two shops. The building was grade II* listed in 1969.

The building is constructed of lined and painted stucco, with rusticated quoins, moulded wooden eaves, and a tile roof. There are two storeys and attics, and three bays. On the ground floor are two shopfronts with pilasters and a continuous entablature, and to the left is a round-arched passage entry. The upper floor contains sash windows in moulded architraves. At the rear is a single-storey extension, beyond which is a two-storey block in brick with a pantile roof, containing horizontally sliding sash windows.

== See also ==
- Grade II* listed buildings in the East Riding of Yorkshire
- Listed buildings in Beverley (south area)
