= 22 High Street, Bridlington =

Building in Bridlington, East Riding of Yorkshire, England

Coordinates: 54.0932°N 0.2058°W

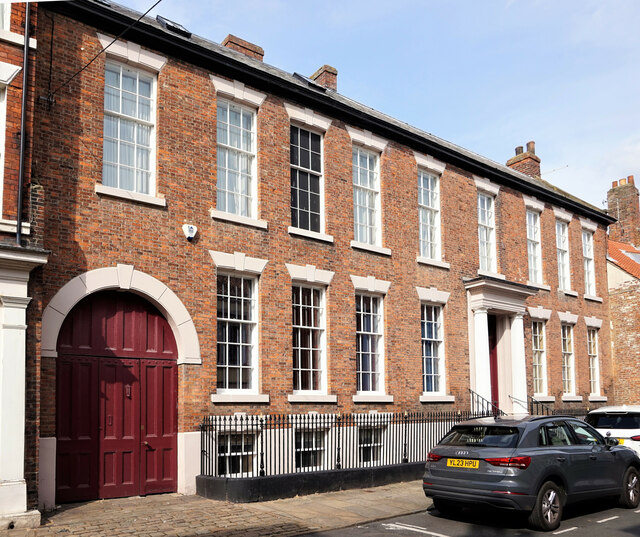
The building, in 2023

22 High Street is a historic building in Bridlington, a town in the East Riding of Yorkshire in England.

The building was constructed in the 18th century, on the north side of the High Street in Bridlington. It may have originally been two houses, but was remodelled around 1825, the work including a new facade. It has since been the largest house on the street. A Dominican convent was established in Bridlington in 1895, and around 1930 it moved to 22 High Street. By 2014, only one nun was living at the property and the convent closed. The building has been grade II* listed since 1951.

The building is constructed of brick, the basement rendered, with a Welsh slate roof. There are two storeys and a basement, and nine bays. Steps with iron handrails lead up to the doorway that has engaged fluted Doric columns, and a small dentilled cornice. The windows, including three in the basement to the left of the doorway, are sashes with carved lintels and keystones. In the left bay is a round-arched carriage entrance with a carved stucco head and a keystone.

== See also ==
- Grade II* listed buildings in the East Riding of Yorkshire
- Listed buildings in Bridlington (Old Town area)
