= 26 and 28 Eastgate =

Building in Beverley, East Riding of Yorkshire, England

Coordinates: 53.8405°N 0.425°W

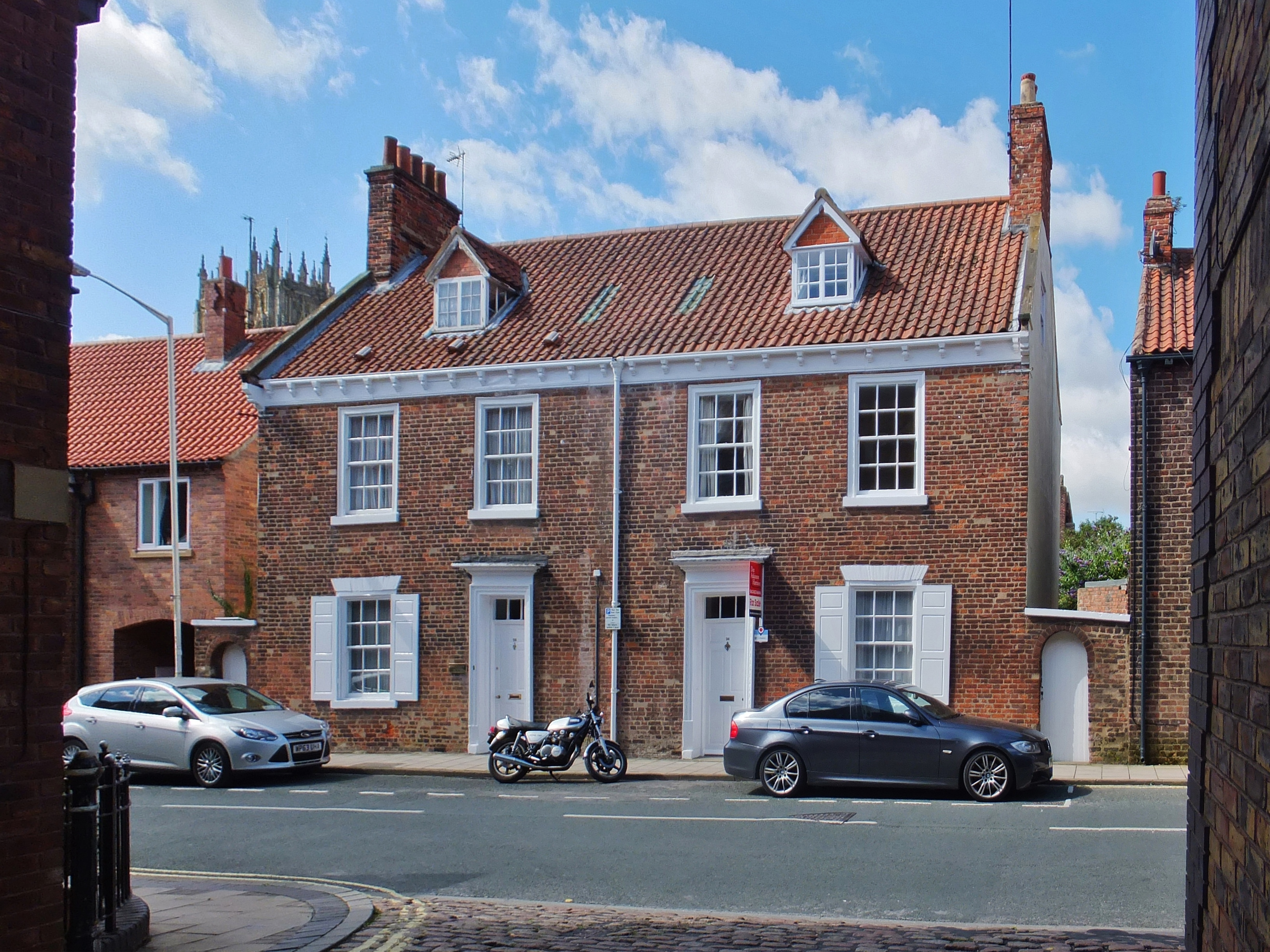
The building, in 2015

26 and 28 Eastgate is a historic building in Beverley, a town in the East Riding of Yorkshire, in England.

The pair of houses were built around 1770, to a design by Thomas Wrightson. Many of the internal fittings, including the staircases, doors and chimneypieces were moved from elsewhere, with some coming from the recently-demolished Hotham House. The external cornice was replaced in the 19th century. The building was grade II* listed in 1950.

The houses are built of red brick, with a wood console eaves cornice, and a pantile roof. There are two storeys and attics, and four bays. The doorways are in the middle bays, and have architraves with finely carved mouldings, divided fanlights, transoms, friezes and dentilled cornices. The windows are sashes, those on the ground floor with stucco lintels and shutters, and on the roof are two gabled dormers.

== See also ==
- Grade II* listed buildings in the East Riding of Yorkshire
- Listed buildings in Beverley (south area)
