= Avenue Hospital =

Former hospital in the East Riding of Yorkshire, England

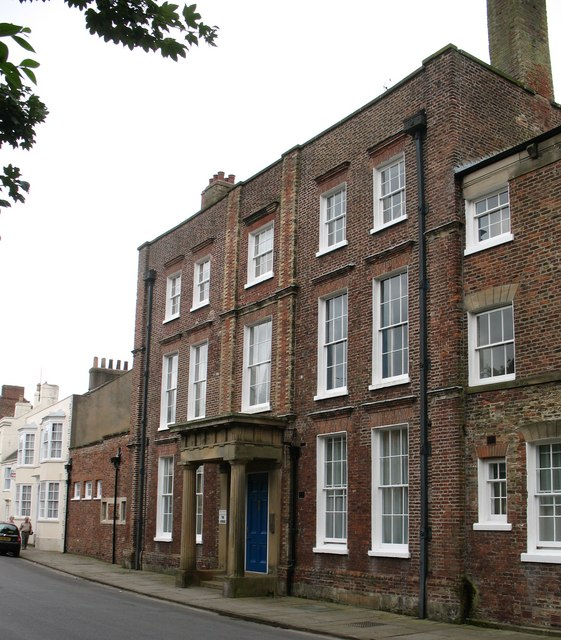
- Avenue Hospital

- Shown in East Riding of Yorkshire

Geography
- Location: Westgate, Bridlington, East Riding of Yorkshire, England
- Coordinates: 54.0935°N 0.2119°W

Organisation
- Care system: NHS

Services
- Emergency department: No

History
- Founded: 1932
- Closed: 1988

Links
- Lists: Hospitals in England

Avenue Hospital was a health facility in Westgate, Bridlington, East Riding of Yorkshire, England. The remaining structure is a Grade II* listed building.

== History ==
The hospital was established in an early 18th century town house in 1932. It joined the National Health Service in 1948. After services transferred to modern facilities at Bridlington Hospital in 1988, the Avenue Hospital closed and, after standing derelict for a few years, the building was converted into apartments in 1993.

== Architecture ==
The building is described by Nikolaus Pevsner as the grandest house on the street. It is constructed of brick, with giant pilasters at the angles and flanking the middle bay, and a stone coped parapet. It has three storeys and is five bays wide. In the centre is a projecting Greek Doric portico with a full entablature, containing steps leading to a doorway with side lights. The windows are sashes with moulded flying cornices. The rainwater heads have a crest and the date. At the rear are two full-height bay windows. Inside, several 18th-century chimneypieces survive, as does one late-18th century plastered ceiling.

== See also ==
- Grade II* listed buildings in the East Riding of Yorkshire
- Listed buildings in Bridlington (Old Town area)
