= 22 North Bar Within =

Building in Beverley, East Riding of Yorkshire, England

Coordinates: 53.8438°N 0.4337°W

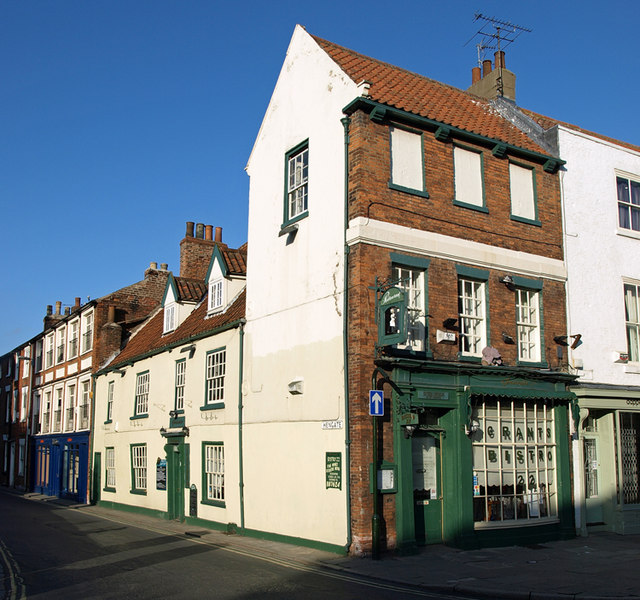
The building, in 2008

22 North Bar Within is a historic building in Beverley, a town in the East Riding of Yorkshire, in England.

The building was constructed in the early 18th century, on the corner of North Bar Within and Hengate. It was heightened in the middle of the century. Around 1795, a shopfront was inserted on the ground floor. The building was grade II* listed in 1950. In 2026, the coffee shop Still moved into the premises, relocating from Kingston upon Hull.

The building is constructed of red brick, the front facing North Bar Within stuccoed on the left return, with a floor band, an eaves cornice on four corbels, and a pantile roof with a coped gable and kneeler on the left. There are three storeys and three bays. The ground floor has a shopfront with three Doric pilasters, a bow window and a shaped bracketed cornice. The front facing Hengate is stuccoed and has two storeys and attics, and four bays. It contains a doorway with a fanlight, and two gabled dormers, and the other windows on both fronts are sashes. Inside, there is a mid-18th century staircase similar to the one at 19 North Bar Within, and four early-18th century chimneypieces.

== See also ==
- Grade II* listed buildings in the East Riding of Yorkshire
- Listed buildings in Beverley (north area)
