= 67 High Street, Bridlington =

Building in Bridlington, East Riding of Yorkshire, England

Coordinates: 54.0932°N 0.2081°W

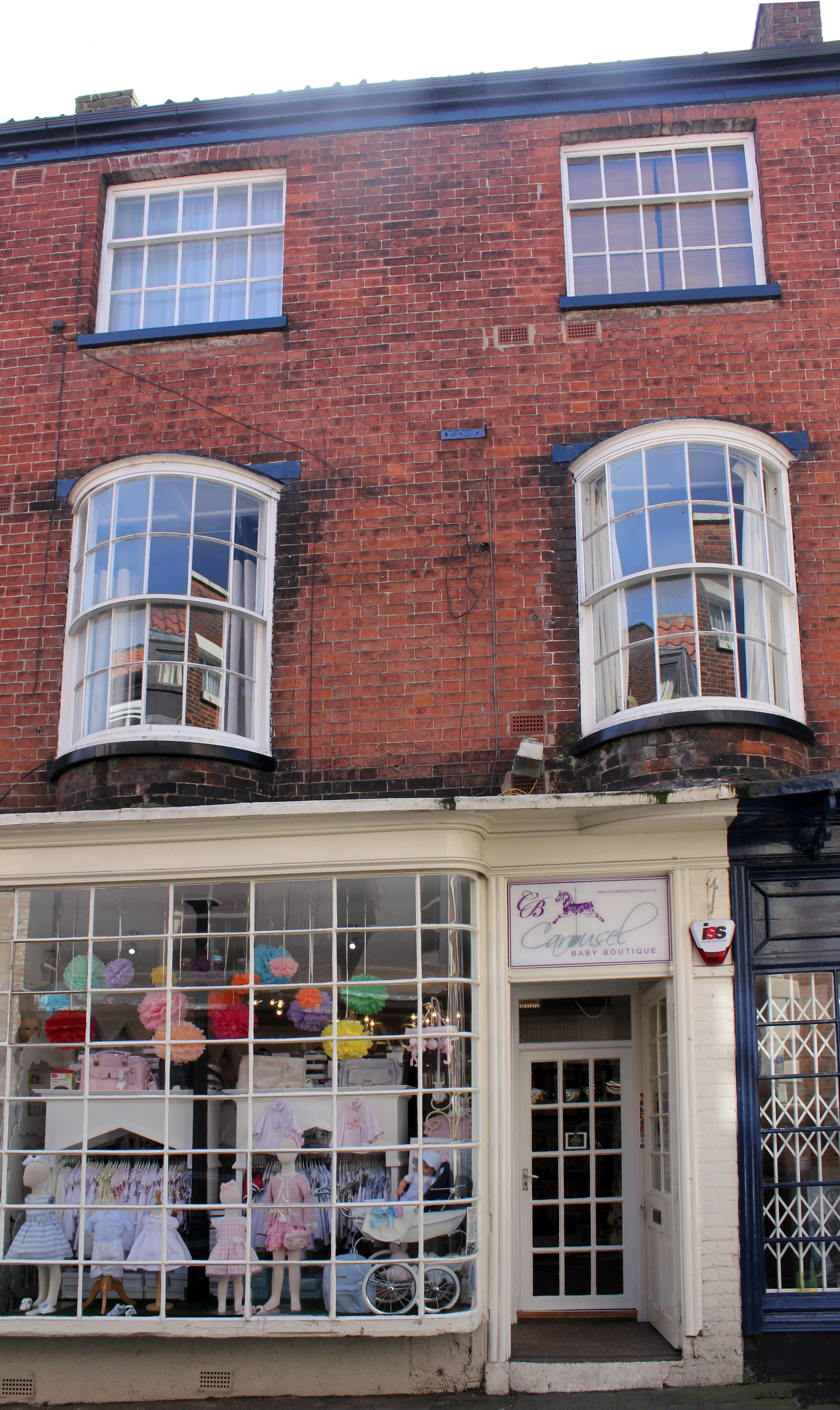
The building, in 2017

67 High Street is a historic building in Bridlington, a town in the East Riding of Yorkshire, in England.

The shop was built in the early 19th century, on the south side of the High Street in Bridlington's Old Town. It was owned by the Dale family for many years and operated as an ironmongery. The building was grade II* listed in 1951.

The shop is in brick, with three storeys and two bays. On the ground floor is a large projecting bay window, described by Nikolaus Pevsner as "very broad and flat-fronted". It has rounded angle glazing and delicate glazing bars of painted brass, which may be a unique survival. To the right is a doorway. The middle floor contains two semicircular bow windows, and on the top floor are two sash windows.

== See also ==
- Grade II* listed buildings in the East Riding of Yorkshire
- Listed buildings in Bridlington (Old Town area)
