= 5 Ladygate =

Building in Beverley, East Riding of Yorkshire, England

Coordinates: 53°50′38″N 0°25′59″W

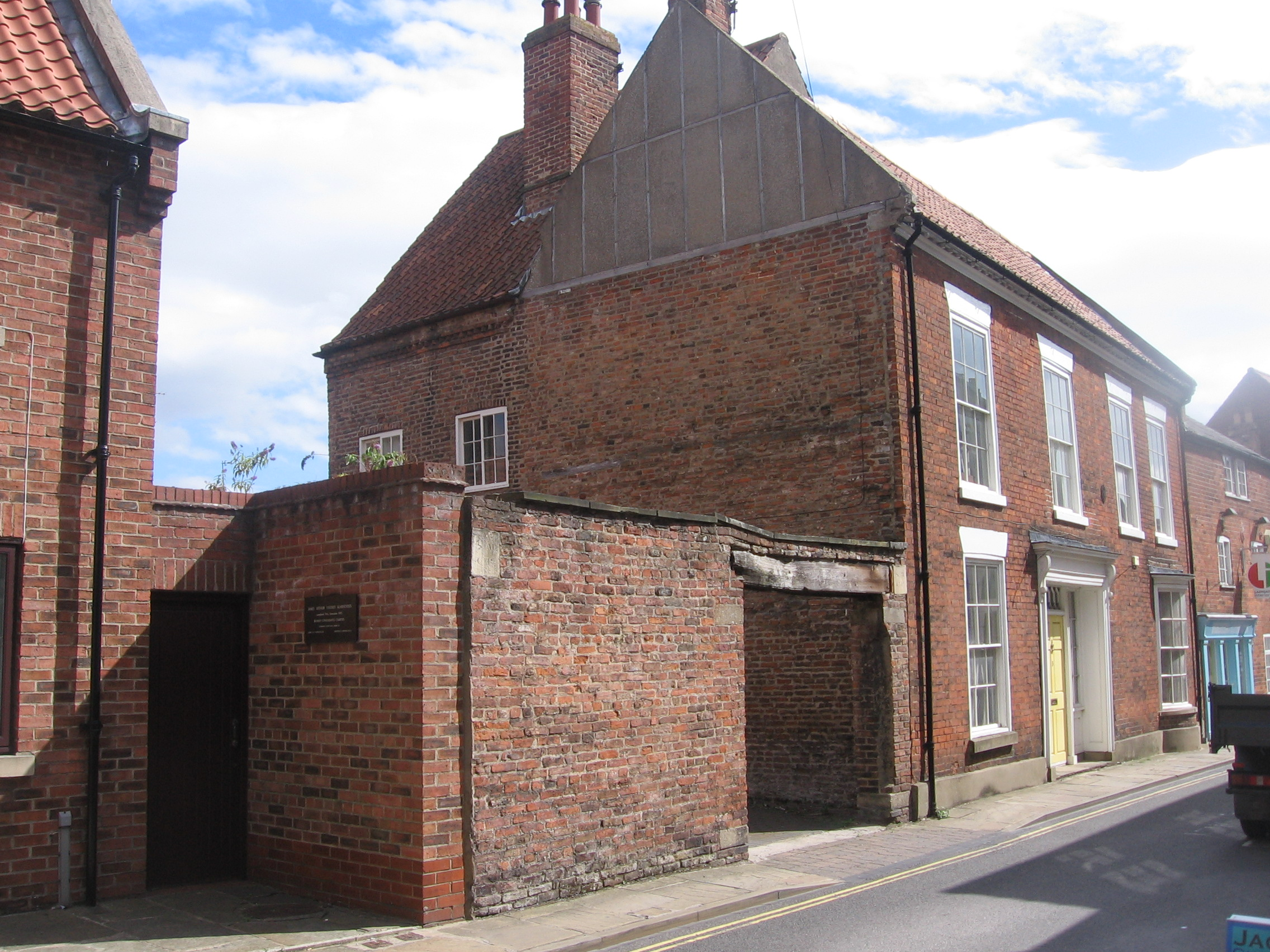
The building, in 2013

5 Ladygate is a historic building in Beverley, a town in the East Riding of Yorkshire, in England.

The house was constructed in the late 17th century, and the front was rebuilt in the late 18th century. The building was grade II* listed in 1950.

The front of the house is constructed of red brick on a stucco plinth, and it has a roof of tile at the front and pantile at the rear. It has two storeys and is four bays wide. The doorway has an architrave, a decorated fanlight, decorated consoles, a frieze and a bracketed cornice. To the right is a bow window with a shallow cornice, and the other windows are sashes with painted stone heads. Inside, there is an impressive 17th-century staircase. The dining room has an early chimneypiece, moved from elsewhere in the house, while the drawing room has a grand chimneypiece brought from Cheadle Hall.

== See also ==
- Grade II* listed buildings in the East Riding of Yorkshire
- Listed buildings in Beverley (central and northeast areas)
