= Bestworth House =

Building in Bridlington, East Riding of Yorkshire, England

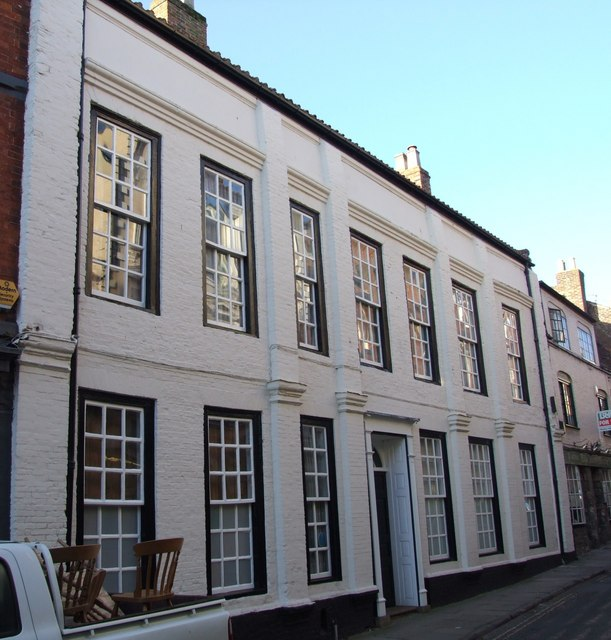
The building, in 2010

Bestworth House, also known as 51 and 53 High Street, is a historic building in Bridlington, a town in the East Riding of Yorkshire, in England.

The house was built in the early 18th century. Part of the ground floor was altered to provide two large display windows for a shop, but in the early 1980s the building was restored and these windows restored to their original appearance. The building was grade II* listed in 1951. Nikolaus Pevsner describes the facade as "most individual".

The house is built of painted brick, with six giant pilasters, a moulded cornice under rendered panels below the eaves, and a pantile roof. It has two storeys and is seven bays wide. The doorway has panelled pilasters and reveals, a semicircular fanlight, a frieze and a cornice, and the windows are sashes. Inside, early panelled rooms and the original staircase survive.

== See also ==
- Grade II* listed buildings in the East Riding of Yorkshire
- Listed buildings in Bridlington (Old Town area)
