= Grade II* listed buildings in the East Riding of Yorkshire =

East Riding of Yorkshire shown in England

There are over 20,000 Grade II* listed buildings in England. This page is a list of the 183 of these buildings in the ceremonial county of the East Riding of Yorkshire.

== City of Kingston upon Hull ==
Name	Location	Type	Completed (Note: The date given is the date used by Historic England as significant for the initial building or that of an important part in the structure's description.)	Date designated	Grid ref. (Note: The grid reference is based on the British national grid reference system, sometimes known as OSGB36, used by the Ordnance Survey.) Geo-coordinates	Entry number (Note: The "List Entry Number" is a unique number assigned to each listed building and scheduled monument by Historic England.)	Image
100 ton steam crane at Alexandra Dock	City of Kingston upon Hull	Steam crane	1886	16 May 1989	TA1279128992; 53°44′42″N 0°17′28″W	1283082	100 ton steam crane at Alexandra Dock More images
Blaydes House	City of Kingston upon Hull	House	c. 1760	13 October 1952	TA1026128998; 53°44′45″N 0°19′46″W	1209566	Blaydes House More images
Church of St Mary	City of Kingston upon Hull	Church	Mid-19th century	13 October 1952	TA1008328776; 53°44′37″N 0°19′56″W	1217998	Church of St Mary More images
City Hall	City of Kingston upon Hull	Town hall	1903–1909	12 November 1973	53°44′37″N 0°20′26″W	1197685	City Hall More images
Former National Westminster Bank	City of Kingston upon Hull	Bank	1873	9 April 1990	TA0997128689; 53°44′35″N 0°20′03″W	1219232	Former National Westminster Bank More images
Guildhall	City of Kingston upon Hull	Civic centre	1906–1914	12 November 1973	TA1002928862; 53°44′40″N 0°19′59″W	1279708	Guildhall More images
Haworth Hall and attached outbuildings, garden wall and summerhouse	City of Kingston upon Hull	House	c. 1755	13 October 1952	TA0883133557; 53°47′13″N 0°20′59″W	1197620	Haworth Hall and attached outbuildings, garden wall and summerhouse More images
Hull Maritime Museum and adjoining railings	City of Kingston upon Hull	Museum	1867–1871	7 January 1970	TA0967928776; 53°44′38″N 0°20′18″W	1219019	Hull Maritime Museum and adjoining railings More images
Humberside University	City of Kingston upon Hull	Art school	1904	12 November 1973	TA0919828719; 53°44′36″N 0°20′45″W	1197653	Humberside University More images
Masters House at Hull Charterhouse and attached boundary wall	City of Kingston upon Hull	House	Late 17th century	13 October 1952	TA1004429317; 53°44′55″N 0°19′58″W	1293252	Masters House at Hull Charterhouse and attached boundary wall More images
Minerva Lodge of Freemasons Number 250	City of Kingston upon Hull	Hall	1802	12 November 1973	TA0978128556; 53°44′31″N 0°20′13″W	1293046	Minerva Lodge of Freemasons Number 250 More images
Old Grammar School Museum	City of Kingston upon Hull	Exchange	1583	13 October 1952	TA0988028526; 53°44′30″N 0°20′08″W	1197660	Old Grammar School Museum More images
Paragon Station and Station Hotel	City of Kingston upon Hull	Office	1849	13 October 1952	TA0917728803; 53°44′39″N 0°20′46″W	1218434	Paragon Station and Station Hotel More images
Statue of William Wilberforce in garden of Wilberforce House	City of Kingston upon Hull	Statue	1883	21 January 1994	TA1022828834; 53°44′39″N 0°19′48″W	1197754	Statue of William Wilberforce in garden of Wilberforce House More images
The Old White Hart Inn	City of Kingston upon Hull	House	c. 1660	13 October 1952	53°44′35″N 0°20′01″W	1197696	The Old White Hart Inn More images
10–15 Whitefriargate	City of Kingston upon Hull	House	1795	13 October 1952	TA0984428664; 53°44′34″N 0°20′09″W	1197675	10–15 Whitefriargate More images

== East Riding of Yorkshire ==
Name	Location	Type	Completed	Date designated	Grid ref. Geo-coordinates	Entry number	Image
Church of St Bartholomew	Aldbrough, East Riding of Yorkshire	Church	12th century	16 December 1966	TA2442238718; 53°49′47″N 0°06′40″W	1083529	Church of St Bartholomew More images
Knedlington Old Hall	Knedlington, East Riding of Yorkshire	House	Early to mid-17th century	16 December 1966	SE7311728094; 53°44′39″N 0°53′34″W	1083235	Knedlington Old Hall More images
Church of St Catherine	Barmby Moor, East Riding of Yorkshire	Church	15th century	26 January 1967	SE7764648942; 53°55′51″N 0°49′08″W	1083879	Church of St Catherine More images
The Manor House	Barmby Moor, East Riding of Yorkshire	House	1597	26 January 1967	SE7777948919; 53°55′50″N 0°49′01″W	1309940	The Manor House More images
Old Hall	Barmston, East Riding of Yorkshire	House	Late 17th century	11 January 1952	TA1556758794; 54°00′44″N 0°14′16″W	1204832	Upload Photo
Church of St Leonard	Beeford, East Riding of Yorkshire	Church	Earlier	20 September 1966	TA1290454379; 53°58′23″N 0°16′49″W	1083372	Church of St Leonard More images
Buckton Hall	Buckton, East Riding of Yorkshire	House	1744	11 January 1952	TA1697973740; 54°08′46″N 0°12′38″W	1083409	Buckton Hall More images
Church of St Michael	Bempton, East Riding of Yorkshire	Church	Early 13th century	30 June 1966	TA1910972099; 54°07′51″N 0°10′43″W	1161842	Church of St Michael More images
Beswick Hall	Beswick, East Riding of Yorkshire	House	c. 1590	7 February 1968	TA0115048123; 53°55′10″N 0°27′41″W	1103484	Beswick Hall More images
Church of All Saints	Kilnwick, East Riding of Yorkshire	Church	12th century or earlier	7 February 1968	SE9970749517; 53°55′56″N 0°28′58″W	1346968	Church of All Saints More images
Ash Close	Beverley, East Riding of Yorkshire	House	c. 1732	1 March 1950	TA0285240083; 53°50′49″N 0°26′17″W	1163343	Ash Close More images
Cross Keys Hotel	Beverley, East Riding of Yorkshire	Hotel	Mid-18th century	1 March 1950	TA0316039654; 53°50′34″N 0°26′01″W	1161728	Cross Keys Hotel More images
Foresters Hall (Ann Rouths House)	Beverley, East Riding of Yorkshire	House	c. 1703	1 March 1950	TA0348239540; 53°50′31″N 0°25′43″W	1346399	Foresters Hall (Ann Rouths House) More images
Foster and Plumpton Chemist White Horse Hotel	Beverley, East Riding of Yorkshire	House	Medieval	1 March 1950	TA0328239840; 53°50′40″N 0°25′54″W	1346350	Foster and Plumpton Chemist White Horse Hotel More images
Highgate House	Beverley, East Riding of Yorkshire	House	Mid to late 18th century	1 March 1950	TA0361239442; 53°50′27″N 0°25′36″W	1083923	Highgate House More images
Keldgate House	Beverley, East Riding of Yorkshire	House	Early 18th century	1 March 1950	TA0352239071; 53°50′15″N 0°25′42″W	1084035	Keldgate House More images
Lord Nelson	Beverley, East Riding of Yorkshire	House	Late 17th century	2 October 1980	TA0387839269; 53°50′21″N 0°25′22″W	1346325	Lord Nelson More images
Monks Walk public house	Beverley, East Riding of Yorkshire	House	Pre 18th century	1 March 1950	TA0368639389; 53°50′25″N 0°25′33″W	1161054	Monks Walk public house More images
St Mary's Court	Beverley, East Riding of Yorkshire	House	15th century	1 March 1950	TA0304039814; 53°50′40″N 0°26′07″W	1084008	St Mary's Court More images
Beverley Friary	Beverley, East Riding of Yorkshire	House	16th century	1 March 1950	TA0386039348; 53°50′24″N 0°25′23″W	1084062	Beverley Friary More images
The Old Grammar School	Beverley, East Riding of Yorkshire	School	c. 1696	1 March 1950	TA0349639096; 53°50′16″N 0°25′43″W	1084045	The Old Grammar School More images
The Red House	Beverley, East Riding of Yorkshire	House	1765	1 March 1950	TA0288540044; 53°50′47″N 0°26′16″W	1083989	The Red House More images
The Sessions House	Beverley, East Riding of Yorkshire	Magistrates' court	1804–1814	1 March 1950	TA0265640173; 53°50′52″N 0°26′28″W	1162300	The Sessions House More images
35 North Bar Within	Beverley, East Riding of Yorkshire	House	c. 1740	1 March 1950	TA0307639777; 53°50′38″N 0°26′05″W	1084007	35 North Bar Within More images
29 North Bar Without	Beverley, East Riding of Yorkshire	House	c. 1730	2 July 1969	TA0287639946; 53°50′44″N 0°26′16″W	1083977	29 North Bar Without More images
44 Toll Gavel	Beverley, East Riding of Yorkshire	House	First half of 18th century	1 March 1950	TA0342139522; 53°50′30″N 0°25′47″W	1083947	44 Toll Gavel More images
58 Flemingate	Beverley, East Riding of Yorkshire	House	Mid to late 17th century	1 March 1950	TA0417639192; 53°50′19″N 0°25′06″W	1084060	58 Flemingate More images
26 and 28 Eastgate	Beverley, East Riding of Yorkshire	House	c. 1750	1 March 1950	TA0373139399; 53°50′26″N 0°25′30″W	1084089	26 and 28 Eastgate More images
54 and 56 Toll Gavel	Beverley, East Riding of Yorkshire	House	Late 17th century	2 July 1969	TA0348539519; 53°50′30″N 0°25′43″W	1083948	54 and 56 Toll Gavel More images
56 Flemingate	Beverley, East Riding of Yorkshire	House	Mid to late 17th century	1 March 1950	TA0417039191; 53°50′19″N 0°25′06″W	1084059	56 Flemingate
18 and 20 North Bar Within	Beverley, East Riding of Yorkshire	House	c. 1700	1 March 1950	TA0316539750; 53°50′38″N 0°26′01″W	1162666	18 and 20 North Bar Within More images
6–14 Butcher Row	Beverley, East Riding of Yorkshire	House	Late 17th century	30 June 1987	TA0352739515; 53°50′30″N 0°25′41″W	1160246	6–14 Butcher Row More images
7 Hengate	Beverley, East Riding of Yorkshire	House	c. 1709	1 March 1950	TA0323839842; 53°50′40″N 0°25′56″W	1310370	7 Hengate More images
45 and 46 Saturday Market	Beverley, East Riding of Yorkshire	House	Mid-18th century	2 July 1969	TA0327439581; 53°50′32″N 0°25′55″W	1346394	Upload Photo
22 North Bar Within	Beverley, East Riding of Yorkshire	House	Early 18th century	1 March 1950	TA0315839761; 53°50′38″N 0°26′01″W	1346358	22 North Bar Within More images
19 North Bar Within	Beverley, East Riding of Yorkshire	House	Mid-18th century	2 July 1969	TA0312739734; 53°50′37″N 0°26′03″W	1084006	19 North Bar Within More images
14 and 16 Newbegin	Beverley, East Riding of Yorkshire	House	Late 17th century	1 March 1950	TA0307839583; 53°50′32″N 0°26′06″W	1162157	14 and 16 Newbegin More images
48 North Bar Without	Beverley, East Riding of Yorkshire	House	1726–1734	1 March 1950	TA0289340011; 53°50′46″N 0°26′15″W	1346385	48 North Bar Without More images
11 Saturday Market	Beverley, East Riding of Yorkshire	House	18th century	2 July 1969	TA0322739723; 53°50′37″N 0°25′57″W	1346373	11 Saturday Market More images
5 Ladygate	Beverley, East Riding of Yorkshire	House	Late 17th century	1 March 1950	TA0319339787; 53°50′39″N 0°25′59″W	1084046	5 Ladygate More images
Church of St Giles	Bielby, East Riding of Yorkshire	Church	Late 12th century	26 January 1967	SE7886443722; 53°50′38″N 0°25′51″W	1084123	Church of St Giles More images
Church of All Saints	Bishop Burton, East Riding of Yorkshire	Church	Early 13th century	7 February 1968	SE9905039731; 53°50′40″N 0°29′46″W	1103429	Church of All Saints More images
Garden House, Boynton Hall	Boynton, East Riding of Yorkshire	House	16th century	30 June 1966	TA1376167729; 54°05′34″N 0°15′44″W	1346640	Garden House, Boynton Hall
Church of All Saints	Brantingham, East Riding of Yorkshire	Church	12th century	7 February 1968	SE9437830085; 53°45′31″N 0°34′12″W	1103351	Church of All Saints More images
Church of St John the Evangelist	Sewerby, East Riding of Yorkshire	Church	1846–1848	9 January 1976	TA2011169074; 54°06′13″N 0°09′52″W	1083693	Church of St John the Evangelist More images
Church of St Magnus	Bessingby, East Riding of Yorkshire	Church	1893–94	9 January 1976	TA1590065948; 54°04′35″N 0°13′48″W	1083689	Church of St Magnus More images
Conservatory to east of Sewerby House	Sewerby, East Riding of Yorkshire	Conservatory	Mid-19th century	7 September 1951	TA2037069067; 54°06′12″N 0°09′38″W	1346514	Upload Photo
Courtyard archway to north west of Sewerby House	Sewerby, East Riding of Yorkshire	Courtyard	Mid-19th century	7 September 1951	TA2031669066; 54°06′12″N 0°09′41″W	1054767	Courtyard archway to north west of Sewerby House More images
Craven House	Bridlington, East Riding of Yorkshire	House	Late 17th century	7 September 1951	TA1746367859; 54°05′36″N 0°12′20″W	1346541	Craven House More images
22 High Street	Bridlington, East Riding of Yorkshire	School	18th century	7 September 1951	TA1744167858; 54°05′36″N 0°12′21″W	1345558	22 High Street More images
Gate house, comprising archway and lodges (numbers 2 and 4) to Sewerby House attached forecourt walls and gatepiers to west	Sewerby, East Riding of Yorkshire	Gate pier	Mid-19th century	9 January 1976	TA2014668932; 54°06′08″N 0°09′51″W	1346515	Gate house, comprising archway and lodges (numbers 2 and 4) to Sewerby House attached forecourt walls and gatepiers to west More images
Hebblethwaite House	Bridlington, East Riding of Yorkshire	House	c. 1670	7 September 1951	TA1715067869; 54°05′36″N 0°12′37″W	1083599	Hebblethwaite House More images
Marton Hall School	Marton, Bridlington, East Riding of Yorkshire	School	1672	7 September 1951	TA2012469687; 54°06′33″N 0°09′51″W	1083696	Marton Hall School More images
Stable block to north west of Sewerby House	Sewerby, East Riding of Yorkshire	Stable	c. 1825	7 September 1951	TA2028469077; 54°06′13″N 0°09′43″W	1083691	Stable block to north west of Sewerby House More images
Terrace balustrade and attached garden wall and archway to Sewerby House	Sewerby, East Riding of Yorkshire	Balustrade	c. 1850	7 September 1951	TA2035069025; 54°06′11″N 0°09′39″W	1083690	Terrace balustrade and attached garden wall and archway to Sewerby House
Avenue Hospital	Bridlington, East Riding of Yorkshire	House	1714	7 September 1951	TA1702267875; 54°05′37″N 0°12′44″W	1083603	Avenue Hospital
The Old Laundry, Sewerby House	Sewerby, East Riding of Yorkshire	Laundry	18th century	7 September 1951	TA2032069082; 54°06′13″N 0°09′41″W	1055861	Upload Photo
The Toft	Bridlington, East Riding of Yorkshire	House	1673	7 September 1951	TA1736367836; 54°05′35″N 0°12′25″W	1083660	The Toft More images
70 High Street	Bridlington, East Riding of Yorkshire	House	Early 18th century	7 September 1951	TA1726567879; 54°05′36″N 0°12′31″W	1083679	70 High Street More images
67 High Street	Bridlington, East Riding of Yorkshire	House	Early 19th century	7 September 1951	TA1729367854; 54°05′36″N 0°12′29″W	1083664	67 High Street More images
42 and 44 High Street	Bridlington, East Riding of Yorkshire	House	Late 17th or early 18th century	7 September 1951	TA1736467854; 54°05′36″N 0°12′25″W	1083673	42 and 44 High Street More images
51 and 53 High Street	Bridlington, East Riding of Yorkshire	House	Early 18th century	7 September 1951	TA1733167846; 54°05′35″N 0°12′27″W	1083662	51 and 53 High Street More images
45 High Street	Bridlington, East Riding of Yorkshire	House	Late 17th century	7 September 1951	TA1735167840; 54°05′35″N 0°12′26″W	1346536	45 High Street More images
46, 46A, 48, 50 and 50A High Street	Bridlington, East Riding of Yorkshire	House	18th century	7 September 1951	TA1735067856; 54°05′36″N 0°12′26″W	1039110	46, 46A, 48, 50 and 50A High Street More images
Low Hall	Bugthorpe, East Riding of Yorkshire	House	Late medieval	26 January 1967	SE7713658120; 54°00′48″N 0°49′28″W	1083872	Upload Photo
The Menagerie approximately 45 metres to west of Burton Constable Hall	Burton Constable Park, Burton Constable, East Riding of Yorkshire	House	Late 20th century	16 December 1966	TA1835236676; 53°48′46″N 0°12′14″W	1083447	The Menagerie approximately 45 metres to west of Burton Constable Hall
The Orangery approximately 10 metres to south-west of Burton Constable Hall	Burton Constable Park, Burton Constable, East Riding of Yorkshire	Orangery	1788–89	16 December 1966	TA1884136687; 53°48′46″N 0°11′48″W	1083445	The Orangery approximately 10 metres to south-west of Burton Constable Hall More images
Church of St Cuthbert	Burton Fleming, East Riding of Yorkshire	Church	12th century	30 June 1966	TA0834872368; 54°08′09″N 0°20′35″W	1083394	Church of St Cuthbert More images
Church of St John the Baptist	Carnaby, East Riding of Yorkshire	Church	Late 13th or early 14th century	30 June 1966	TA1446665591; 54°04′25″N 0°15′08″W	1083821	Church of St John the Baptist More images
Kexby Old Bridge	Catton, East Riding of Yorkshire	Bridge	1650	17 November 1966	SE7050151115; 53°57′05″N 0°55′38″W	1316288	Kexby Old Bridge More images
Church of St Michael	Catwick, East Riding of Yorkshire	Church	15th century	16 December 1966	TA1309245387; 53°53′32″N 0°16′50″W	1249378	Church of St Michael More images
Downs Hall, The Lawns	Cottingham, East Riding of Yorkshire	Hall of residence	1963–1967	30 March 1993	TA0371033601; 53°47′18″N 0°25′38″W	1103346	Downs Hall, The Lawns
Grant Hall, The Lawns	Cottingham, East Riding of Yorkshire	Hall of residence	1963–1967	30 March 1993	TA0368933644; 53°47′20″N 0°25′39″W	1103345	Grant Hall, The Lawns
Lambert Hall, The Lawns	Cottingham, East Riding of Yorkshire	Hall of residence	1963–1967	30 March 1993	TA0379633419; 53°47′12″N 0°25′34″W	1232675	Lambert Hall, The Lawns More images
Morgan Hall, The Lawns	Cottingham, East Riding of Yorkshire	Hall of residence	1963–1967	30 March 1993	TA0380733541; 53°47′16″N 0°25′33″W	1103344	Morgan Hall, The Lawns
Nicholson Hall, The Lawns	Cottingham, East Riding of Yorkshire	Hall of residence	1963–1967	30 March 1993	TA0379933475; 53°47′14″N 0°25′33″W	1276987	Nicholson Hall, The Lawns More images
Reckitt Hall, The Lawns	Cottingham, East Riding of Yorkshire	Hall of residence	1963–1967	30 March 1993	TA0367233588; 53°47′18″N 0°25′40″W	1103343	Reckitt Hall, The Lawns
Southwood Hall	Cottingham, East Riding of Yorkshire	House	Before 1661	3 December 1951	TA0383632224; 53°46′34″N 0°25′33″W	1310021	Southwood Hall More images
Zion United Reformed Church	Cottingham, East Riding of Yorkshire	Chapel	1819	31 January 1967	TA0438132873; 53°46′54″N 0°25′02″W	1103393	Zion United Reformed Church More images
Dalton Hall	Dalton Holme, East Riding of Yorkshire	House	Before 1737	6 May 1952	SE9558445076; 53°53′35″N 0°32′49″W	1161304	Dalton Hall More images
Church of St Mary	Little Driffield, East Riding of Yorkshire	Church	Late 9th or early 10th century	25 January 1985	TA0098857798; 54°00′23″N 0°27′38″W	1083376	Church of St Mary More images
Tithe Barn	Easington, East Riding of Yorkshire	Horse engine house	19th century	27 February 1987	TA3983719124; 53°39′00″N 0°06′51″E	1083473	Tithe Barn More images
Blue Hall	Garton, East Riding of Yorkshire	House	c. 1600	16 December 1966	TA2617335593; 53°48′05″N 0°05′08″W	1346612	Blue Hall More images
Stable block at Grimston Garth	Grimston, East Riding of Yorkshire	Stable	c. 1781–1786	16 December 1966	TA2829435189; 53°47′50″N 0°03′13″W	1083500	Upload Photo
Church of St Mary	Elloughton, East Riding of Yorkshire	Church	15th century	7 February 1968	SE9443328243; 53°44′31″N 0°34′11″W	1203258	Church of St Mary More images
Lelley Windmill	Lelley, Elstronwick	Windmill	1790	6 July 1987	TA2195032600; 53°46′32″N 0°09′04″W	1215991	Lelley Windmill More images
Church of St Mary	Etton, East Riding of Yorkshire	Church	12th century	7 February 1968	SE9814043579; 53°52′45″N 0°30′31″W	1103443	Church of St Mary More images
Church of St Everilda	Everingham, East Riding of Yorkshire	Church	Early 13th century	26 January 1967	SE8040442313; 53°52′15″N 0°46′43″W	1310669	Church of St Everilda More images
Church of St Martin	Fangfoss, East Riding of Yorkshire	Church	12th century	26 January 1967	SE7668853346; 53°58′14″N 0°49′57″W	1083833	Church of St Martin More images
Fangfoss Hall	Fangfoss, East Riding of Yorkshire	House	Late 18th century	26 January 1967	SE7673053378; 53°58′15″N 0°49′54″W	1346460	Upload Photo
Church of St Oswald	Flamborough, East Riding of Yorkshire	Church	c. 1100	30 June 1966	TA2261570155; 54°06′46″N 0°07′33″W	1162230	Church of St Oswald More images
The Old Lighthouse	Flamborough, East Riding of Yorkshire	Lighthouse	1674	11 January 1952	TA2496670810; 54°07′05″N 0°05′23″W	1083400	The Old Lighthouse More images
Church of St Andrew	Foston, East Riding of Yorkshire	Church	12th century	20 September 1966	TA1006455819; 53°59′12″N 0°19′22″W	1346653	Church of St Andrew More images
Elmswell Old Hall	Elmswell, East Riding of Yorkshire	House	1634	20 September 1966	SE9979658140; 54°00′35″N 0°28′43″W	1083792	Elmswell Old Hall More images
Hall Garth	Goodmanham, East Riding of Yorkshire	House	1823–24	26 January 1967	SE8902743006; 53°52′32″N 0°38′50″W	1160374	Upload Photo
Boat hoist on south side of South Dock	Goole, East Riding of Yorkshire	Boat lift	c. 1862	18 April 1986	SE7426822851; 53°41′49″N 0°52′36″W	1083214	Boat hoist on south side of South Dock More images
Lowther Hotel	Goole, East Riding of Yorkshire	Hotel	1824–1826	29 July 1966	SE7471923313; 53°42′03″N 0°52′11″W	1310687	Lowther Hotel More images
Railway swing bridge over River Ouse	Goole, East Riding of Yorkshire	Railway bridge	1869	15 September 1987	SE7649924707; 53°42′47″N 0°50′33″W	1346710	Railway swing bridge over River Ouse More images
Goole Hall	Goole Fields, East Riding of Yorkshire	House	c. 1820	14 February 1967	SE7532521521; 53°41′05″N 0°51′39″W	1103307	Upload Photo
Constable Mausoleum	Halsham, East Riding of Yorkshire	Mausoleum	1792–1802	4 March 1952	TA2705427866; 53°43′54″N 0°04′32″W	1346604	Constable Mausoleum More images
Church of St Nicholas	Ruston Parva, East Riding of Yorkshire	Church	1832	20 September 1966	TA0646361610; 54°02′22″N 0°22′33″W	1083348	Church of St Nicholas More images
Church of St Martin	Lowthorpe, East Riding of Yorkshire	Church	Pre-Conquest	20 September 1966	TA0790960807; 54°01′55″N 0°21′14″W	1346656	Church of St Martin More images
Cross approximately one metre east of east wall of Church of St Martin	Lowthorpe, East Riding of Yorkshire	Cross	Medieval	20 September 1966	TA0792660811; 54°01′55″N 0°21′13″W	1083347	Upload Photo
Church of St Giles	Burnby, East Riding of Yorkshire	Church	Late 12th century	26 January 1967	SE8356846379; 53°54′25″N 0°43′46″W	1084145	Church of St Giles More images
Church of St Mary and St Joseph	Hedon, East Riding of Yorkshire	Church	1803	9 January 1954	TA1904928593; 53°44′24″N 0°11′47″W	1083537	Church of St Mary and St Joseph More images
Hedon Town Hall	Hedon, East Riding of Yorkshire	Lock up	1693	9 January 1954	TA1890428616; 53°44′25″N 0°11′55″W	1083554	Hedon Town Hall More images
Ravenspurn Cross in the grounds of Holyrood House	Hedon, East Riding of Yorkshire	Cross	Early 15th century	20 December 1991	TA1903128731; 53°44′29″N 0°11′48″W	1240953	Ravenspurn Cross in the grounds of Holyrood House More images
The New Hall	Hedon, East Riding of Yorkshire	House	Mid-18th century	9 January 1954	TA1892728497; 53°44′21″N 0°11′54″W	1083574	The New Hall More images
The Old Hall	Hedon, East Riding of Yorkshire	House	Early 18th century	9 January 1954	TA1909828519; 53°44′22″N 0°11′45″W	1083575	The Old Hall More images
Holme Hall	Holme upon Spalding Moor, East Riding of Yorkshire	House	Post 1766	16 December 1966	SE8158838503; 53°50′11″N 0°45′42″W	1083338	Holme Hall More images
Church of St Mary	Hook, East Riding of Yorkshire	Church	14th century	14 February 1967	SE7590825500; 53°43′13″N 0°51′04″W	1160360	Church of St Mary More images
The White House	Hornsea, East Riding of Yorkshire	House	c. 1674	26 November 1985	TA2018147340; 53°54′30″N 0°10′19″W	1249390	The White House More images
Church of St Oswald	Hotham, East Riding of Yorkshire	Church	Early 12th century	16 December 1966	SE8944034580; 53°47′59″N 0°38′37″W	1083305	Church of St Oswald More images
Howden Hall	Howden, East Riding of Yorkshire	House	Late 17th century	17 March 1952	SE7509828532; 53°44′52″N 0°51′46″W	1160523	Howden Hall More images
The Bishop's Manor	Bishop's Manor Park, Howden, East Riding of Yorkshire	House	Earlier than 1388	17 March 1952	SE7488028183; 53°44′41″N 0°51′58″W	1083181	The Bishop's Manor More images
The Langley Archway	Bishop's Manor Park, Howden, East Riding of Yorkshire	Arch	Early 15th century	16 December 1966	SE7482828176; 53°44′41″N 0°52′01″W	1083182	Upload Photo
Church of St Peter	Hutton, Hutton Cranswick, East Riding of Yorkshire	Church	12th century	20 September 1966	TA0241453355; 53°57′58″N 0°26′25″W	1161006	Church of St Peter More images
Saltmarshe Hall	Saltmarshe, East Riding of Yorkshire	House	1825	17 March 1952	SE7820423965; 53°42′23″N 0°49′00″W	1203298	Saltmarshe Hall More images
Holy Trinity Church	Leven, East Riding of Yorkshire	Church	Pre-conquest 1066	7 February 1968	TA1065745232; 53°53′29″N 0°19′04″W	1103456	Holy Trinity Church More images
Gate piers	Londesborough Park, Londesborough, East Riding of Yorkshire	Gate pier	Early 18th century	26 January 1967	SE8691545398; 53°53′51″N 0°40′44″W	1160419	Upload Photo
Church of All Saints	Lund, East Riding of Yorkshire	Church	15th century	7 February 1968	SE9701748145; 53°55′13″N 0°31′27″W	1103410	Church of All Saints More images
Church of All Saints	Mappleton, East Riding of Yorkshire	Church	14th century	16 December 1966	TA2255143864; 53°52′35″N 0°08′14″W	1083417	Church of All Saints More images
Church of St Andrew	Middleton, East Riding of Yorkshire	Church	Early 13th century	20 September 1966	SE9466749571; 53°56′01″N 0°33′34″W	1084151	Church of St Andrew More images
Church of St Ethelburgh	Great Givendale, East Riding of Yorkshire	Church	1849	26 January 1967	SE8133253879; 53°58′29″N 0°45′41″W	1346278	Church of St Ethelburgh More images
Hotham Hall	North Cave, East Riding of Yorkshire	House	1871	16 December 1966	SE8964133707; 53°47′31″N 0°38′27″W	1203450	Hotham Hall More images
Stable block at Hotham Hall	North Cave, East Riding of Yorkshire	Stable	Early 20th century	16 December 1966	SE8959033734; 53°47′32″N 0°38′29″W	1346681	Stable block at Hotham Hall More images
Church of All Saints	North Dalton, East Riding of Yorkshire	Church	12th century	20 September 1966	SE9346952200; 53°57′27″N 0°34′37″W	1161951	Church of All Saints More images
Ferriby House	North Ferriby, East Riding of Yorkshire	House	c. 1760–1770	6 May 1952	SE9877226148; 53°43′21″N 0°30′16″W	1347005	Ferriby House More images
Church of St Elgin	Church End, North Frodingham, East Riding of Yorkshire	Church	10th century	20 September 1966	TA0897953416; 53°57′55″N 0°20′25″W	1083362	Church of St Elgin More images
Kilnwick Percy Hall	Kilnwick Percy, East Riding of Yorkshire	House	c. 1845	26 January 1967	SE8257949861; 53°56′18″N 0°44′37″W	1309858	Kilnwick Percy Hall More images
The White Hall	Winestead, East Riding of Yorkshire	House	1814–15	16 December 1966	TA2930823829; 53°41′42″N 0°02′35″W	1310373	Upload Photo
Rise Hall	Rise, East Riding of Yorkshire	House	1815–1820	16 December 1966	TA1535241942; 53°51′39″N 0°14′51″W	1161753	Rise Hall More images
Church of St Margaret	Long Riston, East Riding of Yorkshire	Church	13th century	16 December 1966	TA1233042725; 53°52′07″N 0°17′35″W	1083422	Church of St Margaret More images
Church of All Saints	Routh, East Riding of Yorkshire	Church	14th century	7 February 1968	TA0911042505; 53°52′02″N 0°20′32″W	1160744	Church of All Saints More images
Church of St Peter	Rowley, East Riding of Yorkshire	Church	12th century	7 February 1968	SE9764732619; 53°46′51″N 0°31′11″W	1347015	Church of St Peter More images
Thorpe Hall	Rudston, East Riding of Yorkshire	House	Mid-17th century	11 January 1952	TA1092967675; 54°05′35″N 0°18′19″W	1346645	Upload Photo
Church of All Saints	Sancton, East Riding of Yorkshire	Church	15th century	26 January 1967	SE8997439467; 53°50′37″N 0°38′02″W	1084105	Church of All Saints More images
Wassand Hall	Wassand Park, Wassand, East Riding of Yorkshire	House	1813–1819	4 March 1952	TA1740746037; 53°53′50″N 0°12′53″W	1249398	Wassand Hall More images
Church of St Lawrence	Sigglesthorne, East Riding of Yorkshire	Church	1616	16 December 1966	TA1544045666; 53°53′40″N 0°14′41″W	1249769	Church of St Lawrence More images
Church of St Mary the Virgin	Wansford, East Riding of Yorkshire	Church	1868	20 September 1966	TA0621656654; 53°59′42″N 0°22′53″W	1162211	Church of St Mary the Virgin More images
Church of St Michael	Skidby, East Riding of Yorkshire	Church	12th century	7 February 1968	TA0150833658; 53°47′22″N 0°27′38″W	1103341	Church of St Michael More images
Skidby Mill and attached mill buildings	Skidby, East Riding of Yorkshire	Mill	1821	6 May 1952	TA0204833313; 53°47′10″N 0°27′09″W	1103339	Skidby Mill and attached mill buildings More images
Church of St Mary	Skirpenbeck, East Riding of Yorkshire	Church	12th century	26 January 1967	SE7498357221; 54°00′20″N 0°51′27″W	1161856	Church of St Mary More images
Bloodstock stables and farmery with walls and gate piers	Sledmere, East Riding of Yorkshire	Stable	1830	20 September 1966	SE9304364854; 54°04′16″N 0°34′47″W	1083807	Bloodstock stables and farmery with walls and gate piers More images
Church of St Mary	Sledmere, East Riding of Yorkshire	Church	Medieval	20 September 1966	SE9300364553; 54°04′07″N 0°34′49″W	1310183	Church of St Mary More images
Stables and carriage house to Sledmere House	Sledmere, East Riding of Yorkshire	Stable	Late 18th century	20 September 1966	SE9300064750; 54°04′13″N 0°34′49″W	1161302	Stables and carriage house to Sledmere House More images
Church of All Saints	South Cave, East Riding of Yorkshire	Church	Mid-13th century	7 February 1968	SE9161431008; 53°46′03″N 0°36′42″W	1103317	Church of All Saints More images
Bridge over River Derwent	Stamford Bridge, East Riding of Yorkshire	Road bridge	1727	18 January 1952	SE7114655578; 53°59′29″N 0°54′59″W	1346426	Bridge over River Derwent More images
Stamford Bridge Railway Viaduct	Stamford Bridge, East Riding of Yorkshire	Railway viaduct	1847	26 January 1967	SE7087255407; 53°59′23″N 0°55′14″W	1083841	Stamford Bridge Railway Viaduct More images
Sutton Bridge	Sutton upon Derwent, East Riding of Yorkshire	Bridge	Late 17th century	25 October 1952	SE7048647663; 53°55′13″N 0°55′42″W	1148519	Sutton Bridge More images
Church of St Michael	Thornton, East Riding of Yorkshire	Church	12th century	26 January 1967	SE7598445200; 53°53′51″N 0°50′43″W	1346434	Church of St Michael More images
The Old Farmhouse, Glebe Farm	Octon, East Riding of Yorkshire	Farmhouse	Late 17th century	2 January 1985	TA0322569885; 54°06′52″N 0°25′21″W	1309563	Upload Photo
Eske Manor	Eske, East Riding of Yorkshire	House	Mid-17th century	9 February 1987	TA0573743236; 53°52′28″N 0°23′36″W	1346994	Upload Photo
Stone building approximately 25 metres south of Church House	Adlingfleet, East Riding of Yorkshire	Outbuilding	Medieval	14 February 1967	SE8438120944; 53°40′41″N 0°43′27″W	1346748	Stone building approximately 25 metres south of Church House More images
Whitgift Hall including attached walls to north outbuildings and screen wall to south east	Whitgift, East Riding of Yorkshire	House	Early 18th century	14 February 1967	SE8166222808; 53°41′43″N 0°45′53″W	1083149	Upload Photo
Church of All Hallows	Walkington, East Riding of Yorkshire	Church	12th century	26 March 1987	SE9984936824; 53°49′05″N 0°29′05″W	1161425	Church of All Hallows More images
Outbuildings to Watton Abbey	Watton, East Riding of Yorkshire	Outbuilding	c. 1150	7 September 1987	TA0232649907; 53°56′07″N 0°26′34″W	1083773	Outbuildings to Watton Abbey More images
Church of St Helen	Welton, East Riding of Yorkshire	Church	Pre 16th century	7 February 1968	SE9589627305; 53°44′00″N 0°32′52″W	1347029	Church of St Helen More images
Welton Grange	Welton, East Riding of Yorkshire	House	c. 1741	6 May 1952	SE9565827193; 53°43′57″N 0°33′05″W	1347030	Welton Grange
Church of St Nicholas	Wetwang, East Riding of Yorkshire	Church	12th century	20 August 1966	SE9328759050; 54°01′09″N 0°34′40″W	1083774	Church of St Nicholas More images
Church Bridge	Wilberfoss, East Riding of Yorkshire	Bridge	Late Medieval	26 January 1967	SE7322250967; 53°56′59″N 0°53′09″W	1083860	Church Bridge More images
Haltemprice Priory Farm	Willerby, East Riding of Yorkshire	House	Late 15th or early 16th century	3 December 1951	TA0419830965; 53°45′53″N 0°25′15″W	1103364	Haltemprice Priory Farm More images
Church of St Nicholas	Withernsea, East Riding of Yorkshire	Church	Mid-15th century	27 February 1987	TA3424927666; 53°43′41″N 0°02′00″E	1366257	Church of St Nicholas More images
Church of All Saints	Wold Newton, East Riding of Yorkshire	Church	12th century	30 June 1966	TA0457873130; 54°08′36″N 0°24′02″W	1346665	Church of All Saints More images
Church of St James	Fordon, East Riding of Yorkshire	Church	12th century	30 June 1966	TA0497275113; 54°09′40″N 0°23′38″W	1162675	Church of St James More images
Lantern turret in garden of No 4 King Street	Woodmansey, East Riding of Yorkshire	Lantern turret	c. 1400	26 March 1987	TA0555137980; 53°49′39″N 0°23′52″W	1161446	Upload Photo
The Bakehouse at Wressle Castle approximately 30 metres north of ruins of Wressle Castle	Wressle, East Riding of Yorkshire	Bakehouse	c. 1380	16 December 1966	SE7066631577; 53°46′33″N 0°55′45″W	1160652	Upload Photo
Church of St Martin	Yapham, East Riding of Yorkshire	Church	13th century	26 January 1967	SE7888551961; 53°57′28″N 0°47′57″W	1161970	Church of St Martin More images

== See also ==
- Category:Grade II* listed buildings in the East Riding of Yorkshire
