= 42 and 44 High Street =

Buildings in Bridlington, East Riding of Yorkshire, England

Coordinates: 54.0932°N 0.207°W

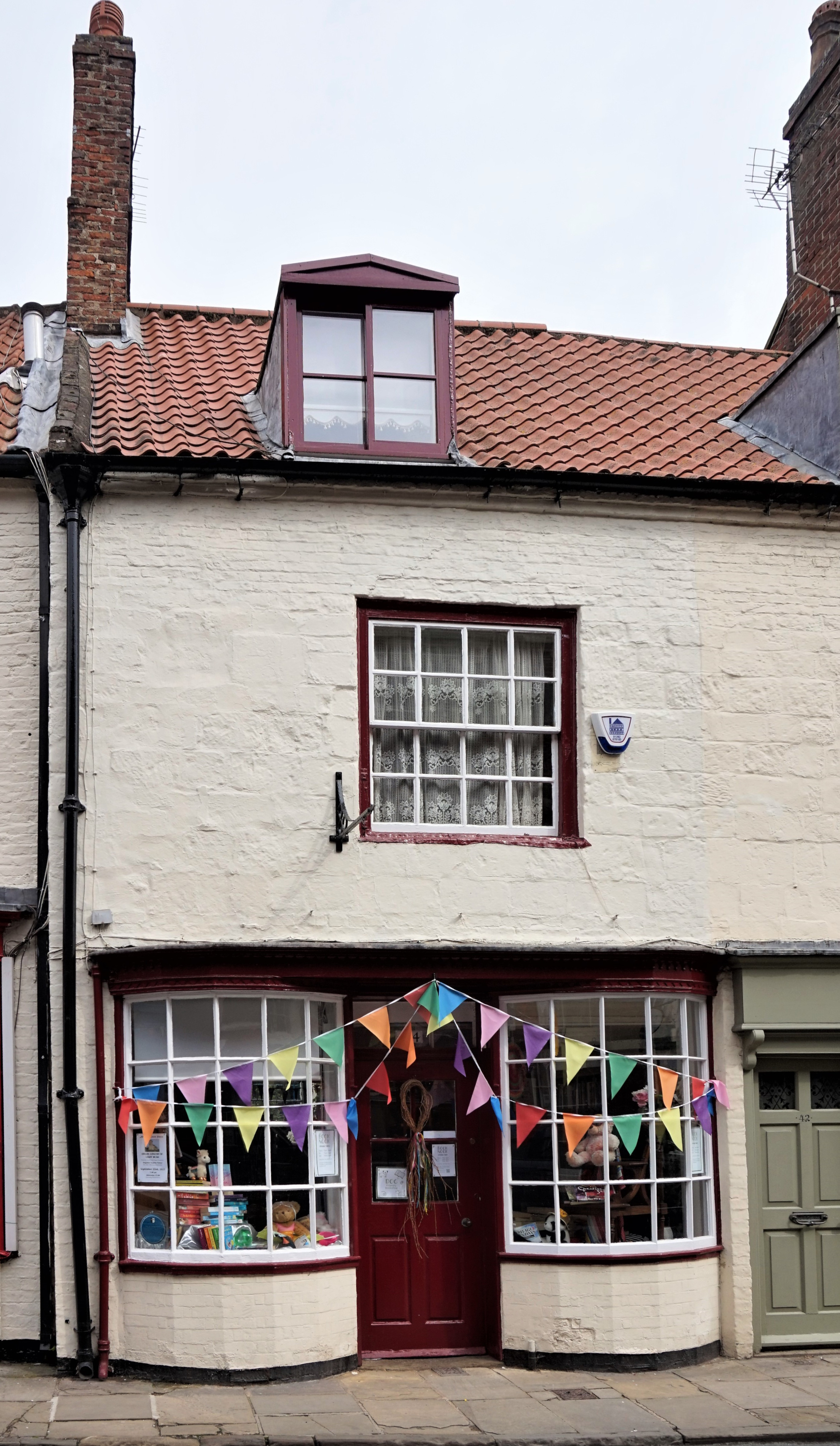
44 High Street, in 2023

42 and 44 High Street are a historic pair of buildings in Bridlington, a town in the East Riding of Yorkshire, in England.

The buildings were constructed as houses around 1700, and incorporate mediaeval stonework brought from Bridlington Priory. The upper windows were replaced in the 18th century, and late in the century, a shopfront was inserted on the ground floor of number 44. Number 42 has a 20th-century shopfront. The shops were jointly grade II* listed in 1951, the high grade on account of the shopfront.

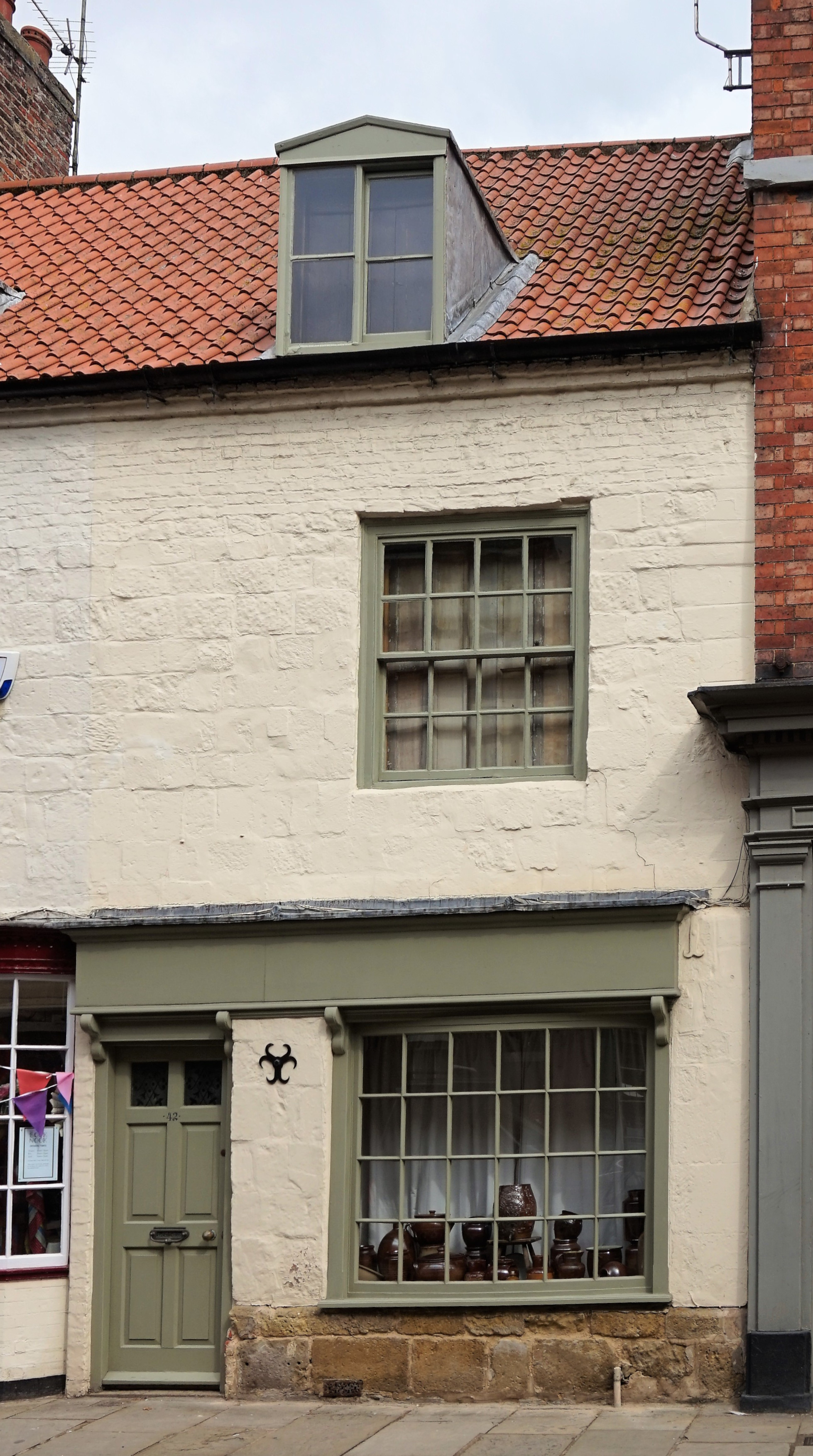
42 High Street, in 2023

The medieval stonework forms most of the front of number 42, while the facades are otherwise in brick and painted. The houses have pantile roofs. There are two storeys and attics, and each house is one bays wide. The right shop has a shopfront with a bow window. The shopfront on the left shop has two bow windows flanking a central doorway, above which are cornices decorated with Gothic arches. The upper floor contains sash windows, and there are two gabled dormers.

== See also ==
- Grade II* listed buildings in the East Riding of Yorkshire
- Listed buildings in Bridlington (Old Town area)
