= 6–14 Butcher Row =

Building in Beverley, East Riding of Yorkshire, England

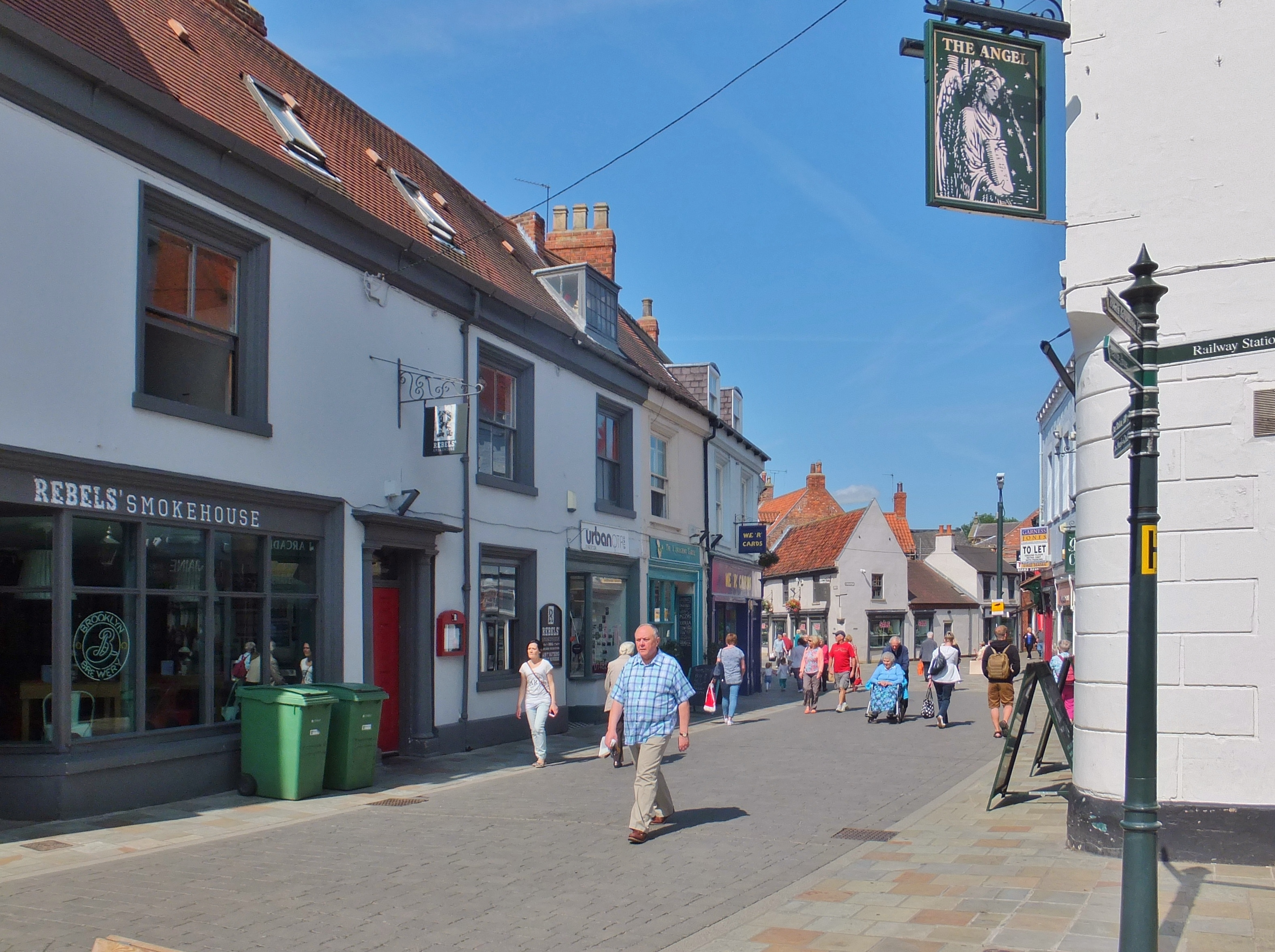
- The terrace in 2015

- Location within East Riding of Yorkshire

General information
- Location: Butcher Row, Beverley, East Riding of Yorkshire, England
- Coordinates: 53°50′30″N 0°25′41″W
- Year built: Late 17th century
- Renovated: c. 1820 (fronts rebuilt)

Listed Building – Grade II*
- Official name: 6–14, Butcher Row
- Designated: 30 June 1987
- Reference no.: 1160246

6–14 Butcher Row is a historic terrace in Beverley, a town in the East Riding of Yorkshire, England.

The terrace was built as housing in the late 17th century, and the fronts were rebuilt around 1820. The houses have since been converted to shops. The terrace was Grade II* listed in 1987.

The shops in the terrace are rendered, and have a moulded cornice, and roofs of slate and tile. There are two storeys and six bays. On the front are two doorways with attached columns, an entablature and a cornice, and the shopfronts and shop windows are modern. The upper floor contains sash windows, and there are three flat-headed roof dormers. Inside, 12 Butcher Row has a 17th-century staircase.

== See also ==
- Grade II* listed buildings in the East Riding of Yorkshire
- Listed buildings in Beverley (central and northeast areas)
