= St Giles' Church, Burnby =

Church in Burnby, East Riding of Yorkshire, England

Coordinates: 53°54′25″N 0°43′46″W

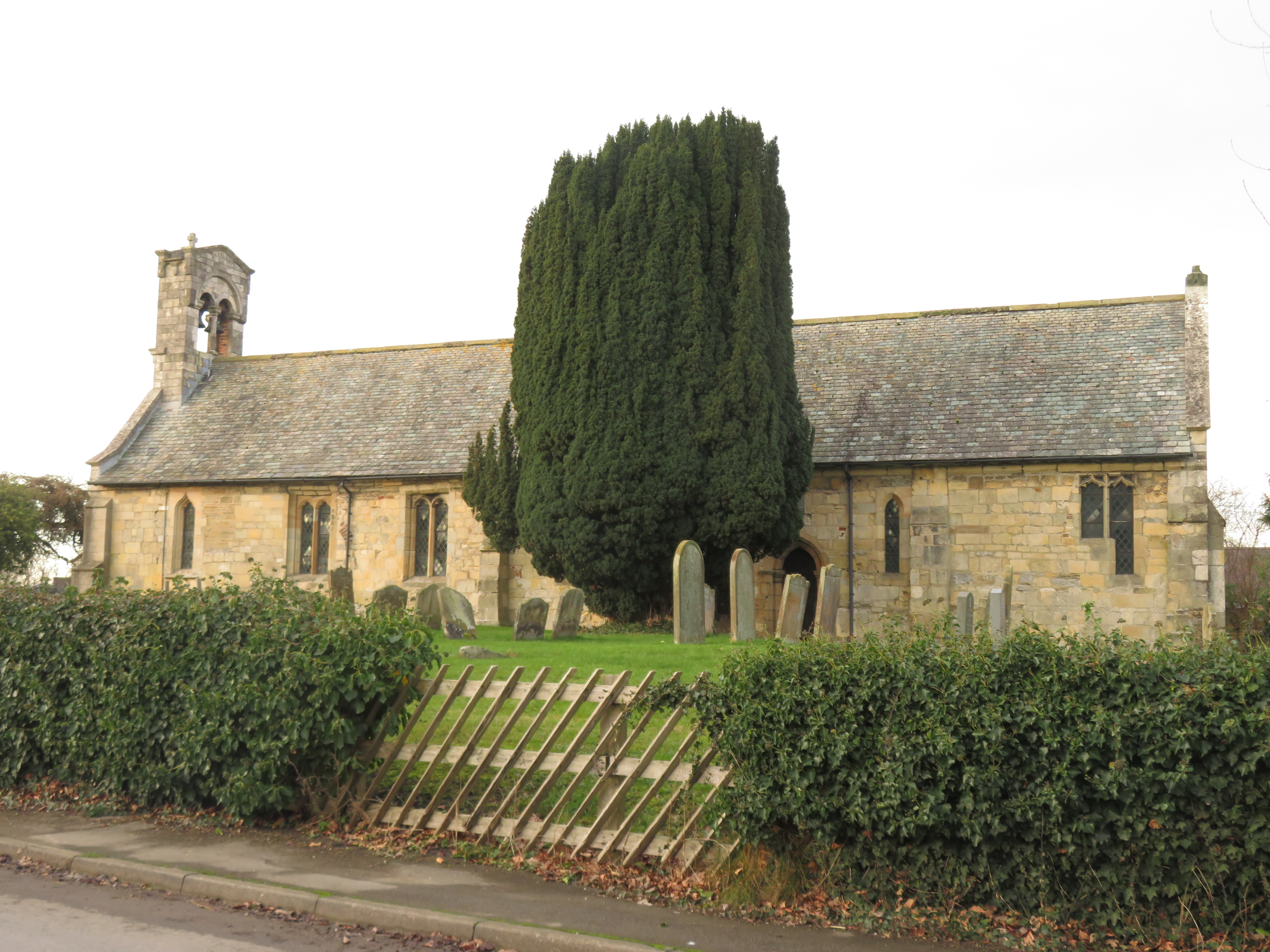
The church, in 2024

St Giles' Church is an Anglican church in Burnby, a village in the East Riding of Yorkshire, in England.

The nave of the church was built in the late 12th century, and the chancel early in the 13th century. The nave had a north aisle which was demolished in the 16th century. The west end of the church was rebuilt by Charles Carr in 1840, and the church was restored by Giles Gilbert Scott in 1908. The building was grade II* listed in 1967.

The church is built of stone with brick patching, it has a slate roof, and consists of a nave and a chancel. On the west end is a bellcote with a double bell opening and a mid-wall shaft under the tympanum. The ornate west door dates from the 19th century and is in Romanesque style, while the priest's door has 13th-century hinges. Inside, there are three early-13th century sedilia and a damaged piscina. There is also a 12th-century tub font with a 19th-century painted inscription.

== See also ==
- Grade II* listed buildings in the East Riding of Yorkshire
- Listed buildings in Hayton, East Riding of Yorkshire
