= Howden Hall =

House in Howden, East Riding of Yorkshire, England

Coordinates: 53.7478°N 0.8627°W

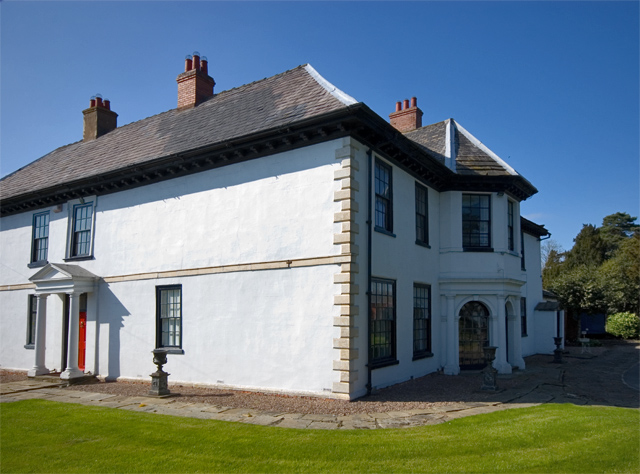
The building, in 2009

Howden Hall is a historic building in Howden, a town in the East Riding of Yorkshire, in England.

The house was built shortly before 1700. It lies on Flatgate, hidden from the street by a high brick wall described by Nikolaus Pevsner as "impressive". A large extension was added to the rear of the house late in the 18th century while early in the 19th century the interior was remodelled and a bay window was added. The building was grade II* listed in 1952.

The house is built of rendered brick, with rusticated quoins, overhanging modillion eaves courses, roofs of Westmorland slate and pantile, and two storeys. The south front has four bays, a floor band, and a hipped roof. On the front is a Doric porch with a pediment, and a doorway with a divided fanlight. The east front has seven bays, it contains a central two-storey canted bay window with a pyramidal roof, and there is an additional single-storey bay on the right. Most of the windows are sashes. Inside, an early staircase survives along with panelling, the fireplace in the sitting room, and numerous massive ceiling beams.

The wall enclosing the garden to the south of the house is separately grade II listed. It is built of red brick with flat copings. It is about 3 metres (9.8 ft) in height, and extends for about 75 metres (246 ft). The wall contains three round-arched doorways with pilasters and architraves, the middle doorway flanked by rectangular panels.

== See also ==
- Grade II* listed buildings in the East Riding of Yorkshire
- Listed buildings in Howden
