= Old Hall, Hedon =

House in Hedon, East Riding of Yorkshire, England

Coordinates: 53°44′22″N 0°11′45″W

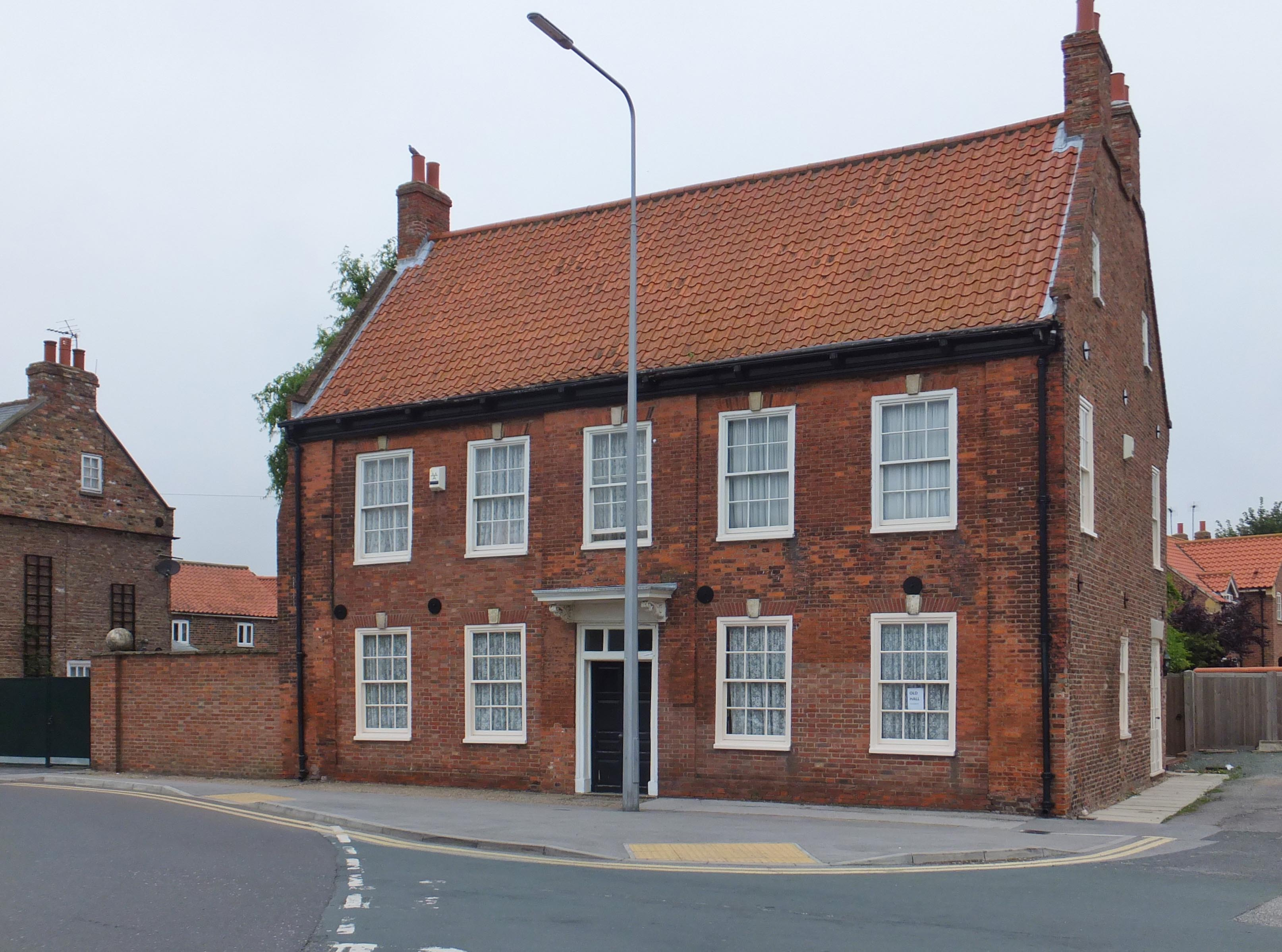
The building, in 2013

Old Hall is a historic building in Hedon, a town in the East Riding of Yorkshire, in England.

The house was constructed on Fletchergate around 1700 for Henry Waterland, a local solicitor. It became derelict in the mid 20th century and remained so until it was restored in the 1980s. Nikolaus Pevsner describes it as "Hedon's best domestic building". It was grade II* listed in 1954.

The house is built of brown brick, with wooden gutter brackets, and a pantile roof with a narrow valley and coped gables carried across valley to form a parapet. It has two storeys, a double depth plan, a front range of five bays, and a rear wing with tumbled brickwork on the gable. The central doorway has a rectangular fanlight, and a hood on carved scrolled consoles. The windows are sashes with rubbed voussoirs and keystones. On the east front is a French window. Inside, the original staircase survives along with much early woodwork. One first floor room has a diagonally-place fireplace with an Arts and Crafts surround.

== See also ==
- Grade II* listed buildings in the East Riding of Yorkshire
- Listed buildings in Hedon
