= 70 High Street, Bridlington =

Building in Bridlington, East Riding of Yorkshire, England

Coordinates: 54.0935°N 0.2085°W

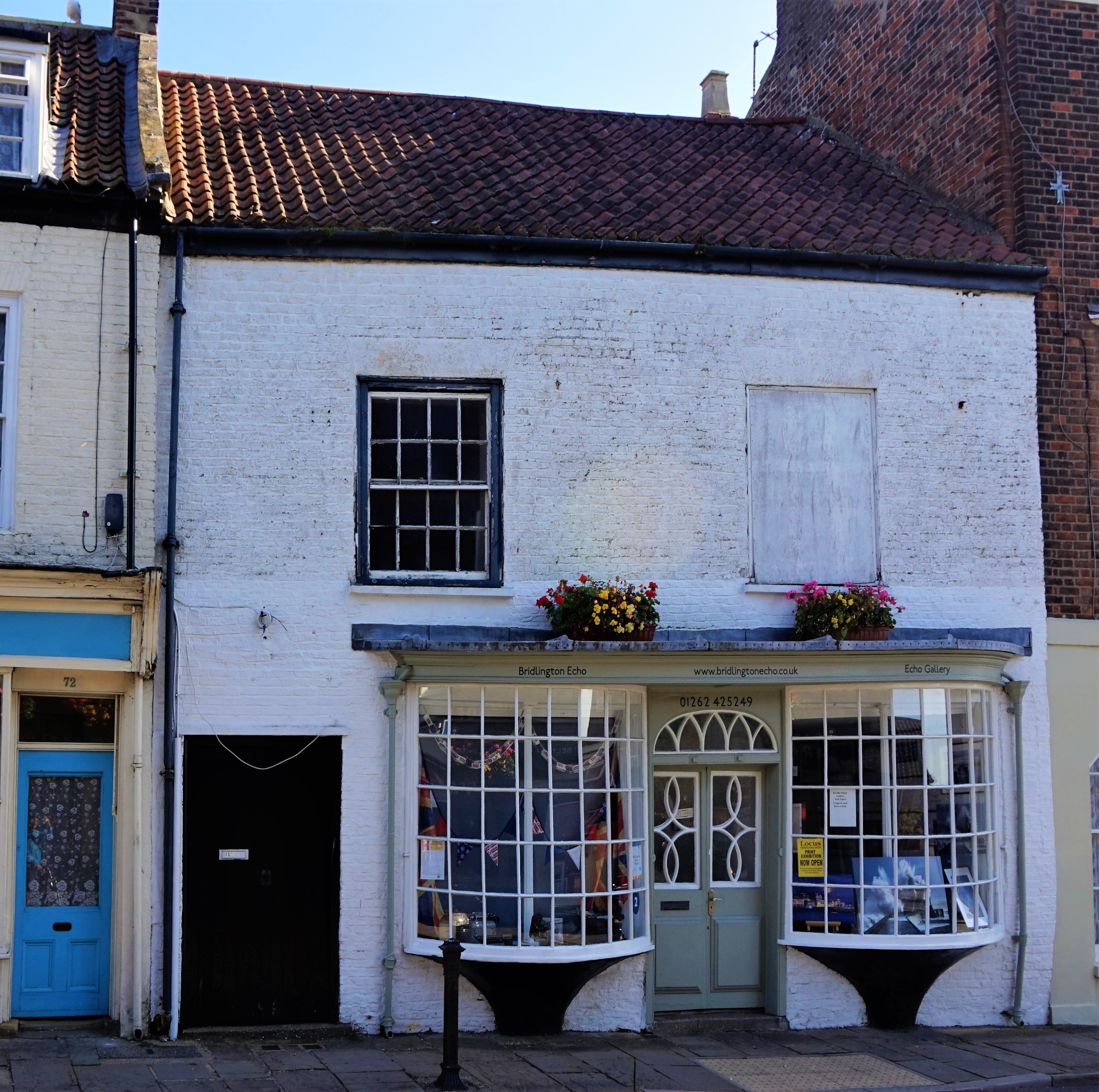
The building, in 2023

70 High Street is a historic building in Bridlington, a town in the East Riding of Yorkshire, in England.

The building was constructed in the early 18th century. Later in the century, a shopfront was installed at ground floor level, described by Nikolaus Pevsner as "enchanting". The building was grade II* listed in 1951. In the 2020s, it served as an art gallery and the offices of the Bridlington Echo newspaper.

The building is constructed of painted brick, with a pantile roof, two storeys and two bays. On the ground floor is a late 18th-century shopfront, consisting of two bow windows on coved supports, flanking a doorway with a segmental fanlight containing Gothic glazing. The upper panels of the door have ornamental glazing, and the upper floor contains two sash windows with stone lintels.

== See also ==
- Grade II* listed buildings in the East Riding of Yorkshire
- Listed buildings in Bridlington (Old Town area)
