= 45 High Street, Bridlington =

Building in Bridlington, East Riding of Yorkshire, England

Coordinates: 54.0931°N 0.2072°W

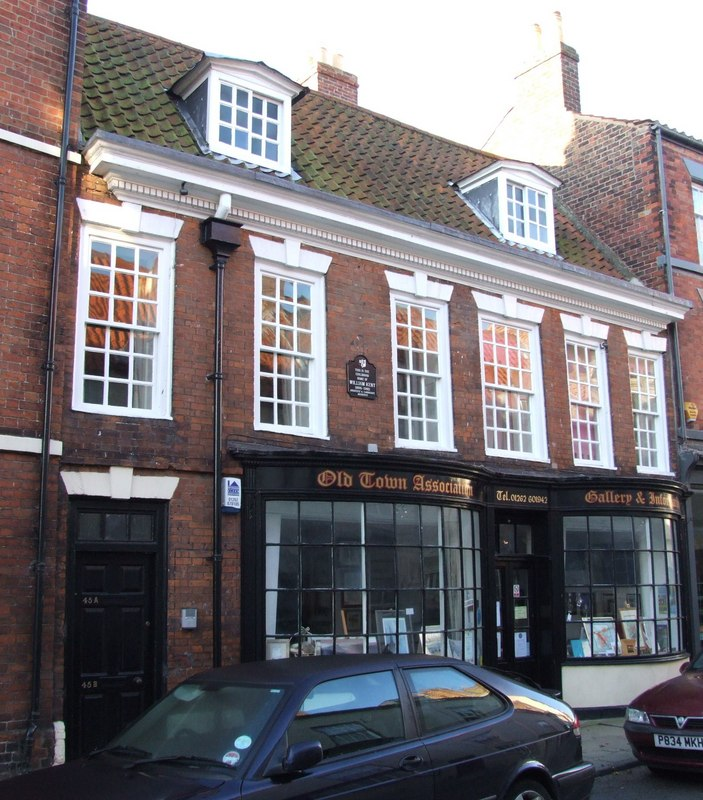
The building, in 2010

45 High Street is a historic building in Bridlington, a town in the East Riding of Yorkshire.

The building was constructed in 1693, as the house of William Cant, a local joiner. Around 1800, it was converted into a shop, and a shopfront was inserted at ground floor level. The building was grade II* listed in 1951.

The building is constructed of brick on a plinth, with a floor bands, a moulded dentiled eaves cornice, and a pantile roof. It has two storeys and attics, and is five bays wide. The ground floor contains an 18th-century shopfront with two bow windows flanking an entrance, a plain frieze and a dentilled cornice. To the left is a doorway with a three-light rectangular fanlight and a keystone. On the upper floor are sash windows with painted brick voussoirs and keystones, and above are two gabled dormers with horizontally sliding sashes. The yard behind is paved with narrow bricks in a herringbone pattern.

== See also ==
- Grade II* listed buildings in the East Riding of Yorkshire
- Listed buildings in Bridlington (Old Town area)
