= 7 Hengate =

Building in Beverley, East Riding of Yorkshire, England

Coordinates: 53.8446°N 0.4323°W

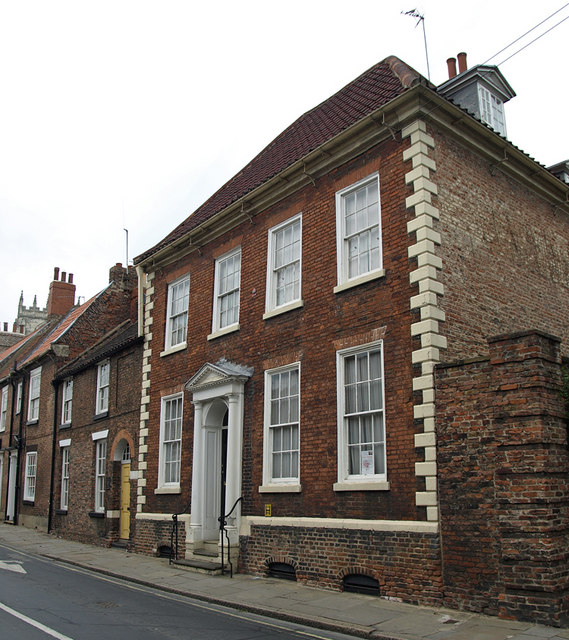
The building, in 2008

7 Hengate is a historic building in Beverley, a town in the East Riding of Yorkshire, in England.

The house was constructed between 1708 and 1709 for Henry Spendlove. It was later used as the townhouse of the Constable family of Wassand Hall. In the 1760s, much of the interior was refitted with ornament brought from elsewhere, probably the recently-demolished Hotham House. The surround of the front door was replaced around 1785. The building was grade II* listed in 1950.

The house is in red brick on a plinth with stone coping, and it has painted stone dressings, rusticated quoins, a brick eaves cornice, and a hipped pantile roof. There are two storeys and a basement, four bays, and a later rear wing. Steps with wrought iron rails and foot scrapers lead up to the doorway that has applied Doric columns, an entablature, a semicircular fanlight, and a shaped bracketed pediment. The windows are sashes with flat gauged brick arches. Inside, panelled rooms survive on the first floor and there is a grand early-18th century staircase.

== See also ==
- Grade II* listed buildings in the East Riding of Yorkshire
- Listed buildings in Beverley (central and northeast areas)
