= 44 Toll Gavel =

Building in Beverley, East Riding of Yorkshire, England

Coordinates: 53.8423°N 0.4291°W

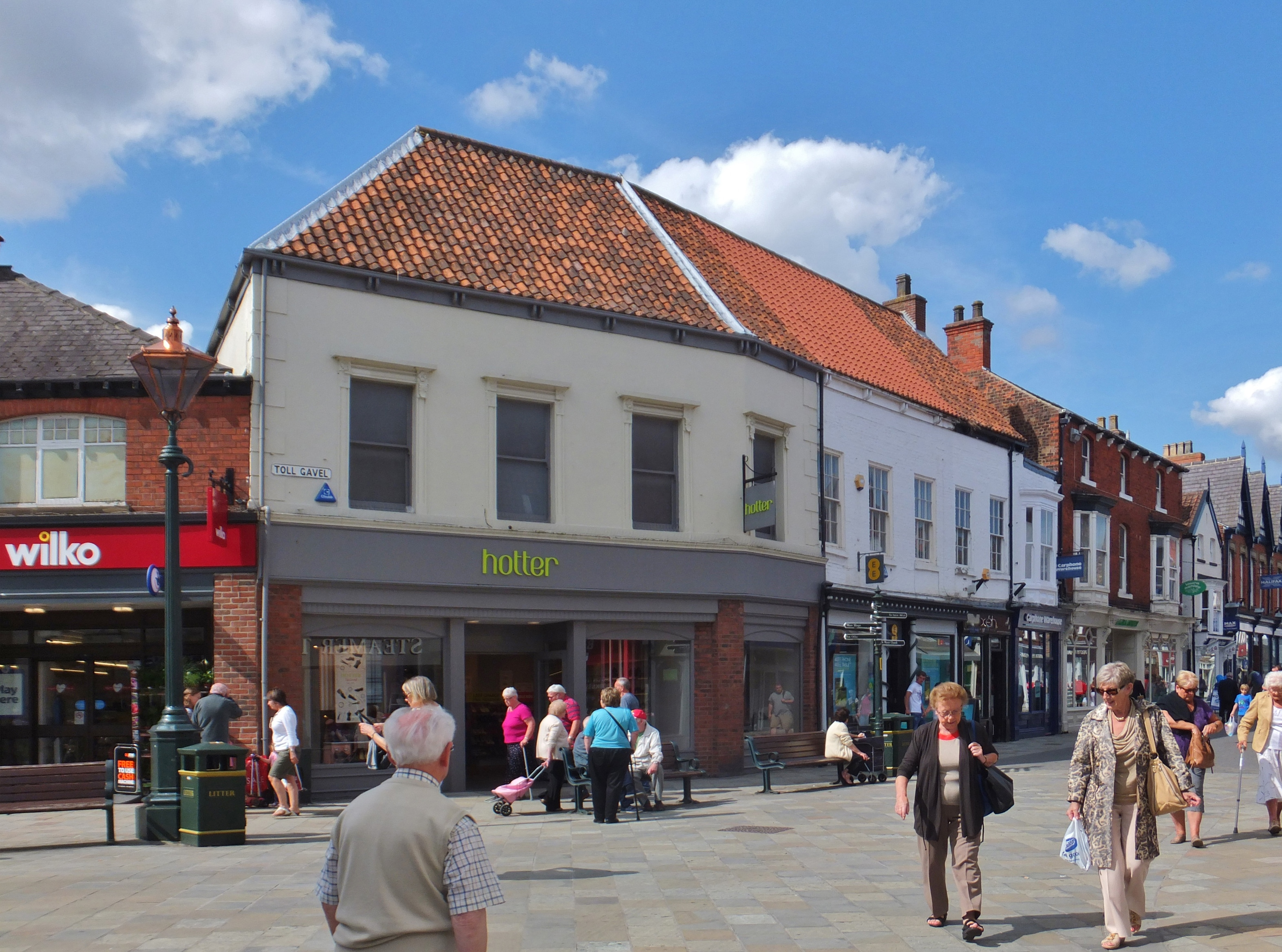
Toll Gavel; 44 is the first white building

44 Toll Gavel is a historic building in Beverley, a town in the East Riding of Yorkshire, in England.

The building was constructed in the first half of the 18th century. Around 1830 it was divided into two shops, the leftmost being a pharmacy, with each having a shopfront inserted at ground floor level. Historic England describe that of the pharmacy as "the most interesting shop front of [its] date in the town". The building was grade II* listed in 1950.

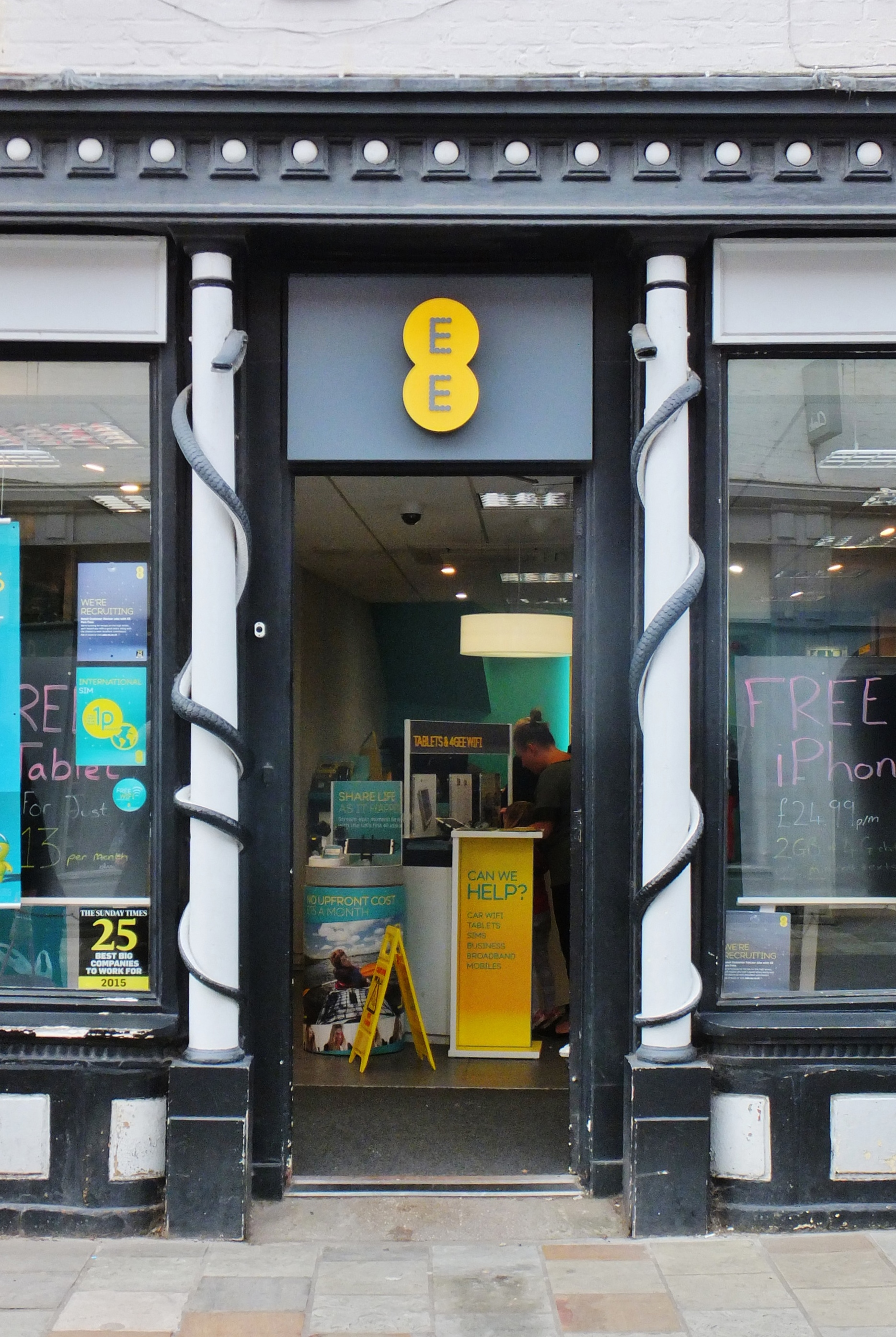
The doorway

Two shops in painted brick, with an eaves cornice and a tile roof. There are three storeys and five bays. On the ground floor are two shopfronts, the left one that of a pharmacist dating from about 1830. It has two shop windows with panelled bases, surmounted by bands of vertical reeding. At each end is a semi-elliptical elongated Doric attached column on a pedestal. Flanking the central door are two engaged Doric columns on pedestals with metal serpents twining round them. Across the front is a lintel, and a decorated cornice with paterae. The upper floors contain sash windows.

== See also ==
- Grade II* listed buildings in the East Riding of Yorkshire
- Listed buildings in Beverley (south area)
