= Marton Hall =

Building in Bridlington, East Riding of Yorkshire, England

Coordinates: 54.109°N 0.163°W

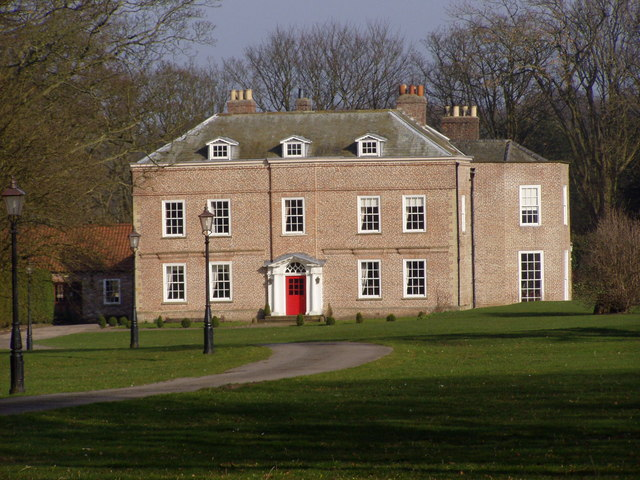
- The building in 2009

- Location within East Riding of Yorkshire

General information
- Status: Converted to hotel and restaurant
- Type: House then preparatory school (former)
- Location: Flamborough Road, Bridlington, East Riding of Yorkshire, England
- Year built: 1672

Listed Building – Grade II*
- Official name: Marton Hall School
- Designated: 7 September 1951
- Reference no.: 1083696

Marton Hall is a historic building on Flamborough Road in Bridlington, a town in the East Riding of Yorkshire, England.

The house was built in 1672, while the entrance was rebuilt in the late 18th century. A preparatory school was established in Bridlington in 1889, and in 1912 it moved to Marton Hall. After the school closed, it was converted into a hotel and restaurant. The building has been Grade II* listed since 1951.

The house is built of brick, with rusticated quoins, a moulded string course, a floor band, and a hipped slate roof. It has two storeys and attics, and is five bays wide, the middle bay projecting slightly. In the centre is a doorway with engaged Doric columns, pilasters, an entablature, a segmental fanlight with Gothic tracery and an open pediment. The windows are sashes with moulded surrounds. On the right return is a later two-storey canted bay. Inside, the original staircase survives, and one room has a ceiling with original plasterwork.

== See also ==
- Grade II* listed buildings in the East Riding of Yorkshire
- Listed buildings in Bridlington (Sewerby and Marton)
