= Foresters' Hall, Beverley =

Historic building in the East Riding of Yorkshire

Coordinates: 53.8418°N 0.428°W

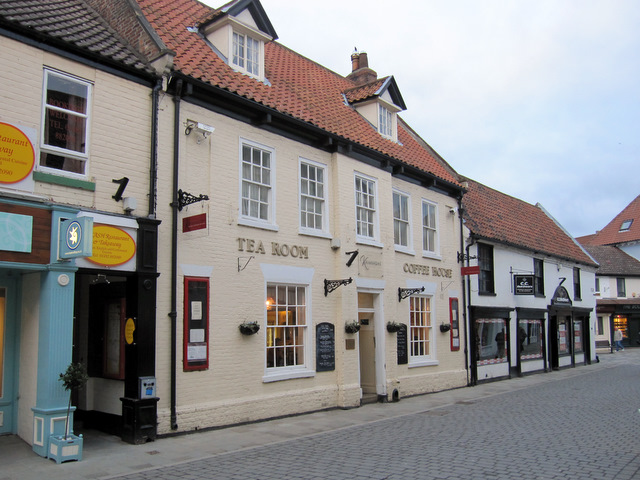
The building, in 2011

Foresters' Hall, also known as Ann Routh's House or 65 Toll Gavel, is a historic building in Beverley, a town in the East Riding of Yorkshire, in England.

The house was built in 1703 for Ann Routh, to a design by the local builder Thomas Elliner. In the mid-18th century the staircase and its window were altered, while around 1820 some of the windows at the front were altered, along with the cornice. The building has served a wide variety of uses, including use by the Odd Fellows, for whom Hawe & Foley designed a meeting room, completed in 1895. The building was grade II* listed in 1950.

The house is built of painted brick on a moulded plinth, with a wooden eaves cornice, and a pantile roof. There are two storeys and attics, and five bays. The central doorway has a rectangular fanlight, the windows are sashes, those on the ground floor with rendered lintels, and on the roof are two dormers with steep pediments. At the rear is a large Venetian window. Inside, much mid-18th century work survives, including the staircase and doorways, and panelling in one room.

== See also ==
- Grade II* listed buildings in the East Riding of Yorkshire
- Listed buildings in Beverley (south area)
