= 11 Saturday Market =

Building in Beverley, East Riding of Yorkshire, England

Coordinates: 53.8435°N 0.4326°W

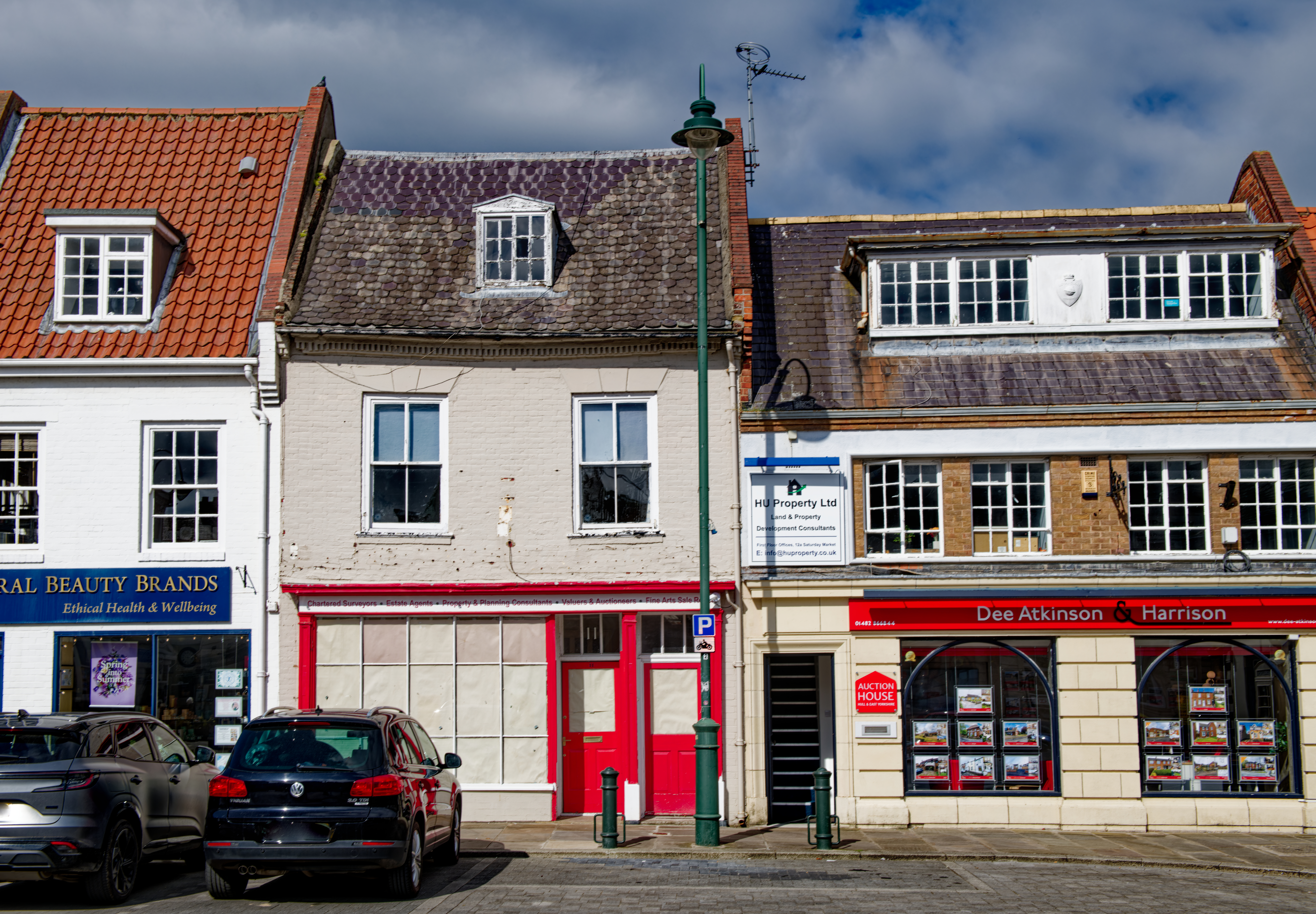
The building, in 2024

11 Saturday Market is a historic building in Beverley, a town in the East Riding of Yorkshire in England.

The building was constructed on the north-east side of Saturday Market in 1755. In the Victorian period, a shop front was added to the ground floor. The building was grade II* listed in 1969, on account of its high-quality original internal features.

The shop is built of painted brick, with a dentilled eaves cornice, and a roof of scalloped slates. There are two storeys and an attic, and two bays. The ground floor has a shopfront containing two adjacent entrances on the right with pilasters and an entablature. On the upper floor are sash windows with stone lintels and incised keystones, and above is a pedimented dormer. Inside, the main ground floor room has original panelling and a highly decorative chimneypiece and overmantel. The original staircase also survives, as do panelling and window seats in the first floor rooms. One room has an impressive 19th-century chimneypiece.

== See also ==
- Grade II* listed buildings in the East Riding of Yorkshire
- Listed buildings in Beverley (central and northeast areas)
