= Rose and Crown =

Rose and Crown may refer to:

== Pubs ==
- Rose and Crown, a popular Pub name
- Rose & Crown, Beverley, a pub in the East Riding of Yorkshire, England
- Rose and Crown, Bow, a former pub in London, England
- Rose and Crown, Isleworth, a pub in London
- Rose and Crown, St Albans, a pub in Hertfordshire, England
- Rose and Crown, Stoke Newington, a pub in London
- Rose and Crown, York, a pub in North Yorkshire, England
- The Rose and Crown, Clay Hill, a pub in London
- Rose & Crown Bar, Belfast, Northern Ireland, subject of the 1974 Rose & Crown Bar bombing
- Rose & Crown Pub & Dining Room, Epcot, Walt Disney World Resort, Florida, U.S.
- Rose and Crown Tavern, a former farmhouse and tavern in New Dorp, Staten Island, U.S.

== Other uses ==
- The Rose and Crown (St. Paul's Churchyard), a historical bookseller in London
- The Rose and Crown (film), a 1957 Australian TV play
- Rose and Crown Club, an 18th-century London club for artists and collectors
- The Rose and Crown (play), by J. B. Priestley, 1947

== See also ==
- Tudor rose
- Crown of the Rose, a coin
