= Listed buildings in Beverley =

Beverley is a civil parish in the county of the East Riding of Yorkshire, England. It contains about 450 listed buildings that are recorded in the National Heritage List for England. These can be found in:

- Listed buildings in Beverley (central and northeast areas)
- Listed buildings in Beverley (south area)
- Listed buildings in Beverley (west and southwest areas)
- Listed buildings in Beverley (southeast area)
- Listed buildings in Beverley (north area)
