= Beverley Bar =

Medieval gatehouse in Beverley, Yorkshire, England

- Beverley, East Riding of Yorkshire, England
- Beverley North Bar

Site information
- Owner: Historic England
- Open to the public: No
- Condition: Complete

Location
- in the East Riding of Yorkshire
- Location within East Riding of Yorkshire
- Coordinates: 53.844937°N 0.435918°W
- Grid reference: TA 02992 39871

Site history
- Built: 1409
- Materials: Brick
- Events: Pilgrimage of Grace; English Civil War

Garrison information
- Designations: Grade I listed

Beverley Bar or Beverley North Bar is a 15th-century gate situated in Beverley, East Riding of Yorkshire, England. It is designated a Grade I listed building and is now recorded in the National Heritage List for England, maintained by Historic England. The bar is located between North Bar Without and North Bar Within, close to Beverley St Mary's and abuts buildings on either side. Traffic is limited to single file through the bar arch and controlled by a set of lights.

== History ==
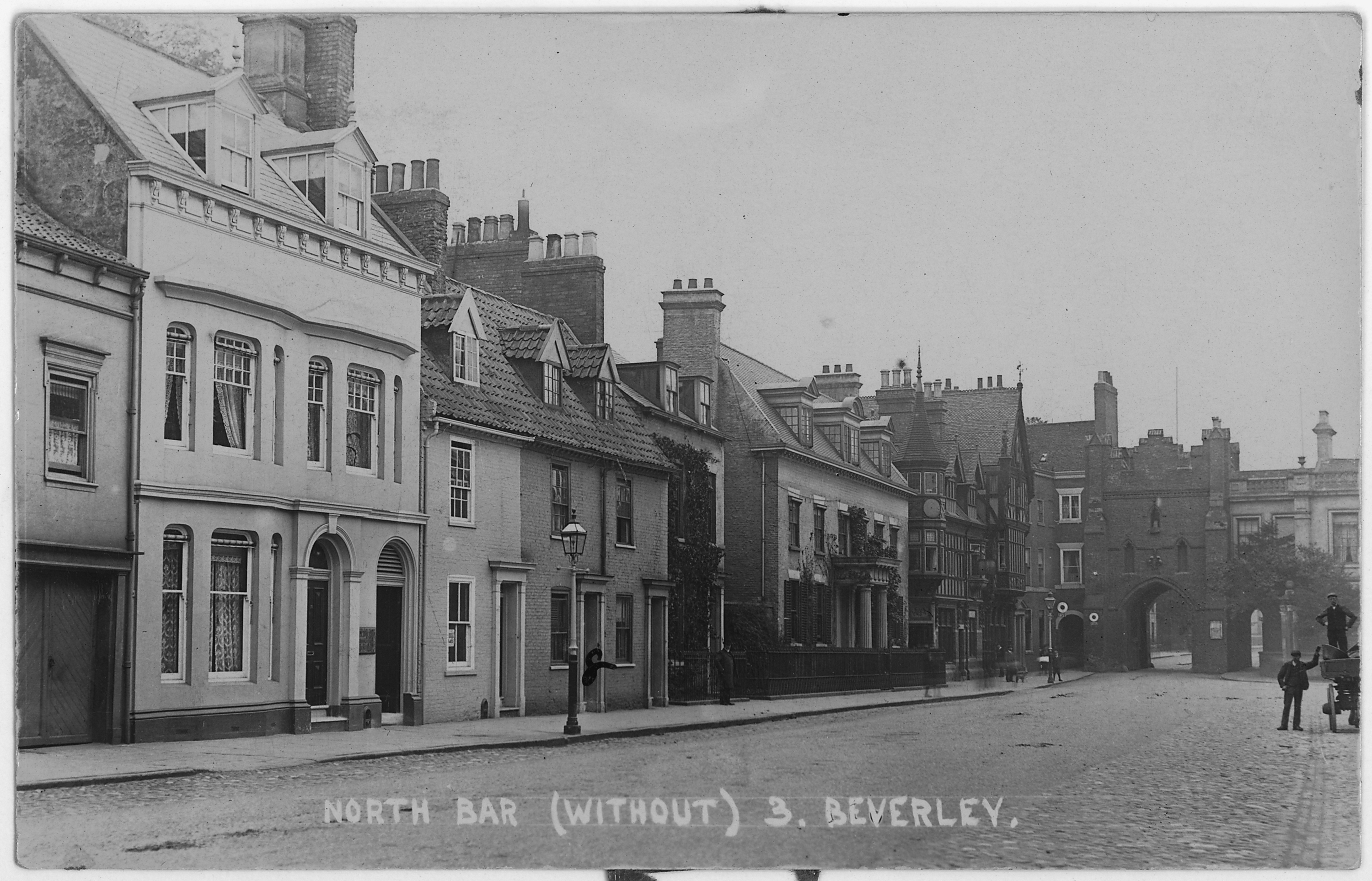
"North Bar (without) Beverley." A street scene in 1932

In the early medieval period, the town of Beverley was not walled. There are records indicating that Bars had been built in the 12th and 13th centuries, but North Bar is the only survivor. It was built in 1409 at a cost of £98 (£128,000 in 2020), and was renovated in the 17th century.

In 1673 the bi-annual horse fair was held on the street within the bar and the bi-annual sheep fair in the street without the bar. In 1686 the annual cattle fair was moved to street within the bar and the sheep and horse fairs were moved to the street without the bar. The cattle fair was moved elsewhere in the town in 1865 and by 1959 all fairs had moved further afield.

The bars also acted as toll gates, passage through them having to be paid for as a sort of local tax. For example, records (extract below) for the year 1420 in which King Henry V visited the town, demonstrate that North Bar was the principal route into the town by the amount of tolls collected.

£17- 4s. 8d. received for pavage at the North bar this year by John Fletcher and John Grimsby collectors as appears by their accounts.
£2. Is. 9^d. received by John Smyth the collector in Norwood for pavage this year as appears by his account examined and proved. 
13s. 4d. received by William Read collector at Newbegin bar this year as appears &c.
18s. 4|d. received by Richard Batty collector at Keldgate bar for pavage as appears &c.
£2. 2s. 9d. received by John Fayr collector at the river for pavage this year as appears &c.

There are records of the North Bar being used as viewing gallery for the town governors in the 15th and 16th centuries during the plays that occurred at the Corpus Christi festivals. In 1643, a year into the English Civil War, the mayor, the Rt Hon Manbie, ordered that North Bar, as well as Newbigin and Keldgate Bars, be locked by constables of those wards between the hours of nine at night and six in the morning.

== Layout ==
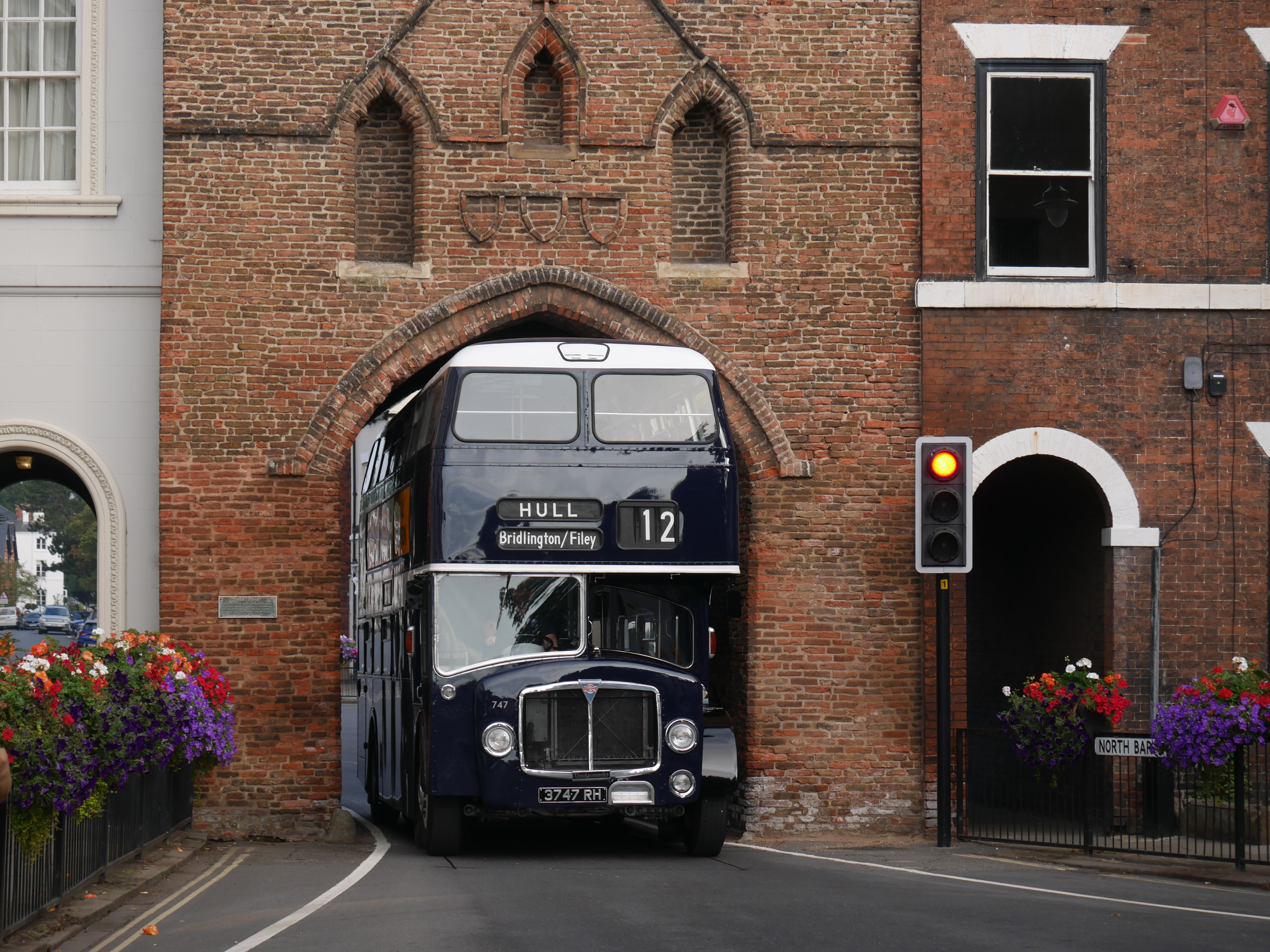
A preserved East Yorkshire Motor Services bus with an arched roof passes under the Bar in August 2022

The two-storey structure is made of brick with buttresses on the North face either side of the archway. Above the centre point of the arch is a carved stone cartouche of a coat of arms. Either side of the carving are two recessed windows that have been filled in with brick. Above these is a recessed window. Before reaching the crenellated parapet, there is a course of brickwork marking the level.

On the South face above the centre point of the arch is some protruding brickwork of three shields hanging from a line. These are located in between two recessed windows that have been bricked up, and a third smaller bricked-up window above. These are enclosed by a line of brickwork resembling gables. Above these are two modern rectangular windows. Before reaching the crenellated parapet, there is a course of brickwork marking the level. Inside the archway, the rib vaulting matches the dimensions of the arches and is built in two bays. There is a portcullis groove.

== See also ==
- Beverley town walls
- Grade I listed buildings in the East Riding of Yorkshire
- Listed buildings in Beverley (north area)
