= St Nicholas' Church, Beverley =

Church in Beverley, East Riding of Yorkshire, England

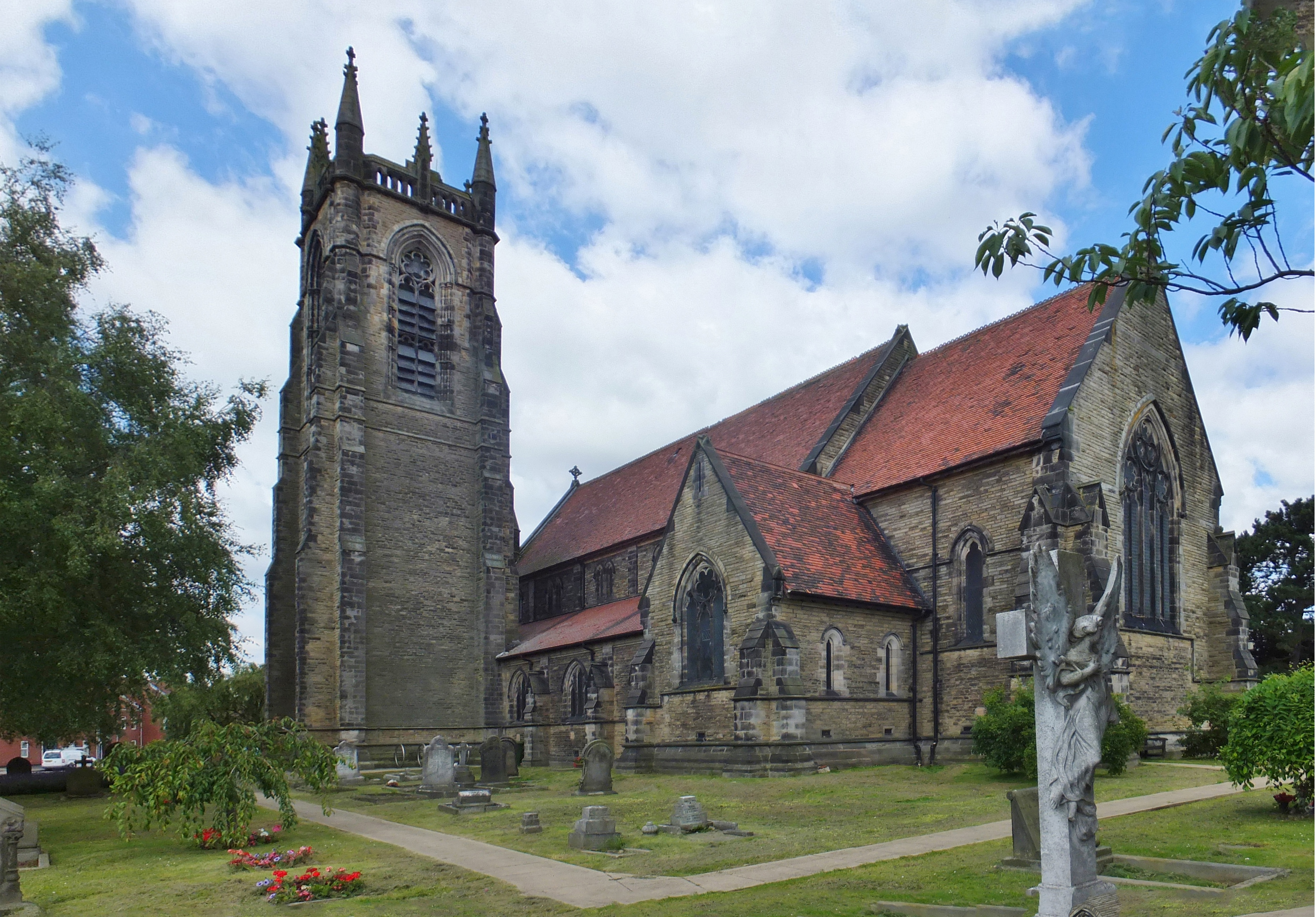
The church, in 2015

St Nicholas' Church is an Anglican church in Beverley, a town in the East Riding of Yorkshire, in England.

A church in Beverley dedicated to Saint Nicholas was first recorded in 1160. It was partly demolished between 1653 and 1655, and its parish was merged into St Mary's Church, Beverley in 1667. Work began on an elaborate new church, to be dedicated to St Nicholas, in 1876, but this was abandoned and instead a simpler church, to a design by J. S. Crowther, was completed in 1880. It was initially a chapel of ease to St Mary, but in 1959 was given its own parish. A vestry was added in 1934, and the building was grade II listed in 1987.

The church is built of sandstone and has a red tile roof. It consists of a nave with a clerestory, a south aisle, a chancel, and a southwest tower incorporating a porch with a pointed south doorway. Above the doorway are louvred bell openings, and arcaded parapets and pinnacles. Inside, there is an octagonal Perpendicular Gothic font, which was moved from St Margaret's Church, Long Riston.

== See also ==
- Listed buildings in Beverley (southeast area)
