= St Mary's Manor =

Manor house in Beverley, East Riding of Yorkshire, England

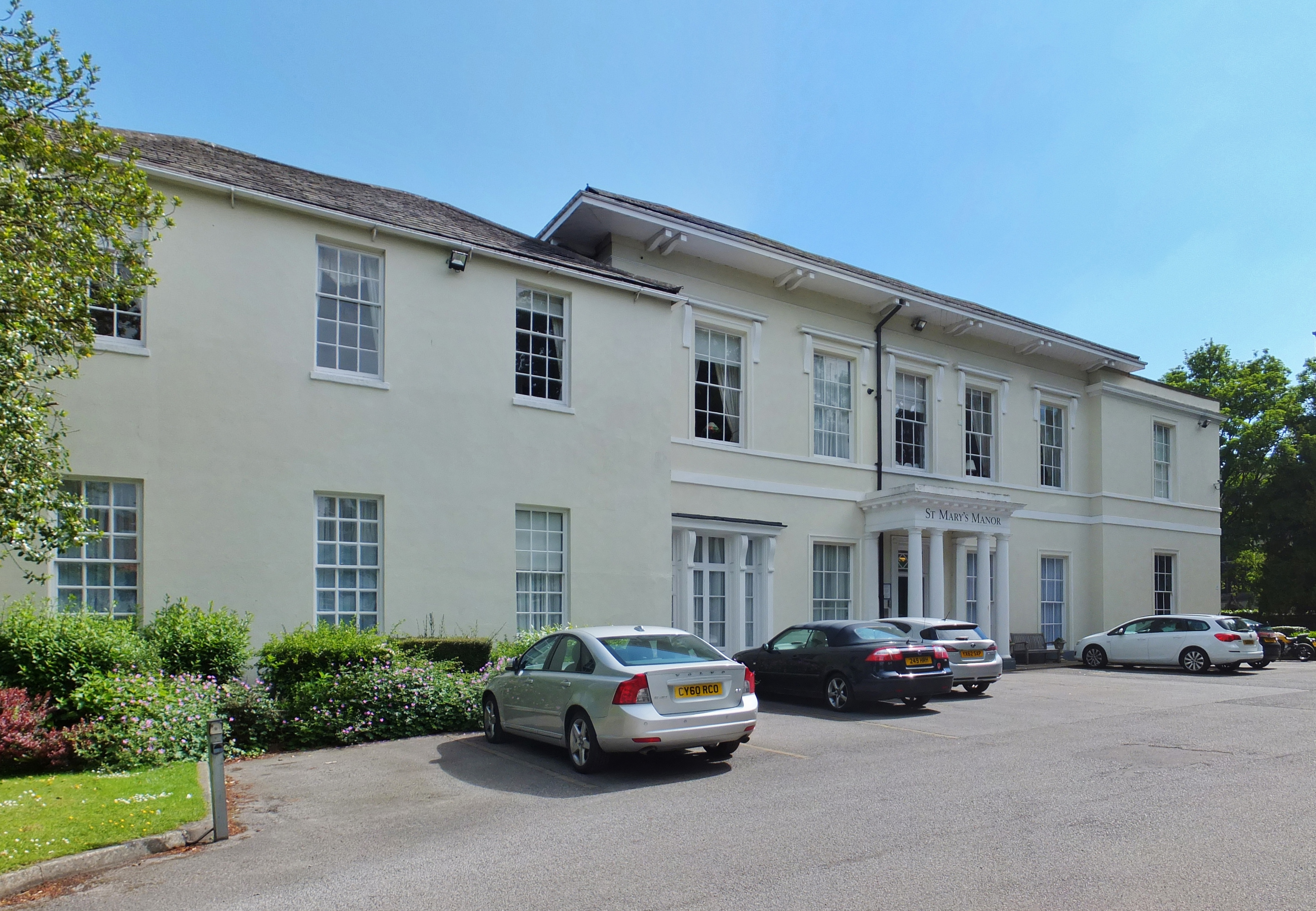
The building, in 2015

St Mary's Manor is a historic building in Beverley, a town in the East Riding of Yorkshire, in England.

A large house was constructed in the late 17th century on North Bar Within, probably for James Moyser. It was a two-storey building, seven bays wide, the central bay projecting slightly and containing a prominent doorway with a hood. It had pilasters in the Doric order. A north wing was added in the early 18th century. Around 1803, the house was largely rebuilt for Henry Ellison, the vicar of the neighbouring St Mary's Church, Beverley. The interior was remodelled around 1828, the work including enlargement of the entrance hall. Around the middle of the century, a large conservatory was added at the south end, then in the early 20th century, this was replaced by a brick extension. Also in the 19th century, the garden was laid out in a parkland style. The building was grade II listed in 1950, and around 2000 was converted into 40 apartments.

The north wing is constructed of painted brick, and the rest of the house is in painted stucco, with wide spreading eaves and hipped Westmorland slate roofs. It has two storeys, the main block has five bays, the south wing has one bay and the north wing has three. In the centre is a tetrastyle Roman Doric porch, and a doorway with a reeded architrave with paterae, and a rectangular ornamental fanlight. On the ground floor are casement windows with consoles and a cornice, and the other windows are sashes, some with consoles and cornices. At the rear is a three-bay bowed centre. Inside, the staircase is from 1828, leading to a landing with Ionic order pilasters. The landing has a balustrade brought from Beverley Minster, which was designed by Nicholas Hawksmoor. One first floor room has early oak panelling.

== See also ==
- Listed buildings in Beverley (north area)
