= 4 North Bar Without =

Building in Beverley, East Riding of Yorkshire, England

Coordinates: 53.8457°N 0.4359°W

The building, in 2026

4 North Bar Without is a historic building in Beverley, a town in the East Riding of Yorkshire, in England.

The house was constructed in the late 18th century. Between 1892 and 1894, it was remodelled by the woodcarver James Edward Elwell, to use as his premises. Nikolaus Pevsner describes the work as "excellently carved". The building was grade II listed in 1977.

The building is timber framed on the front, with the gable end facing the road, and it has three storeys, each storey jettied. The ground floor has a shopfront with a three-light window, a doorway to the left, and carvings. The middle floor contains a seven-light bay window above a range of carved heraldic shields. On the top floor are two three-light windows flanking a carved figure in a niche. The gable is flanked by carved figures, and surmounted by a wrought iron weathervane. The carving includes cartoon scenes depicting William Ewart Gladstone and Benjamin Disraeli. Inside, there is a staircase, also carved by Elwell.

== See also ==
- Listed buildings in Beverley (north area)
