= 19 North Bar Within =

Building in Beverley, East Riding of Yorkshire, England

Coordinates: 53.8437°N 0.4339°W

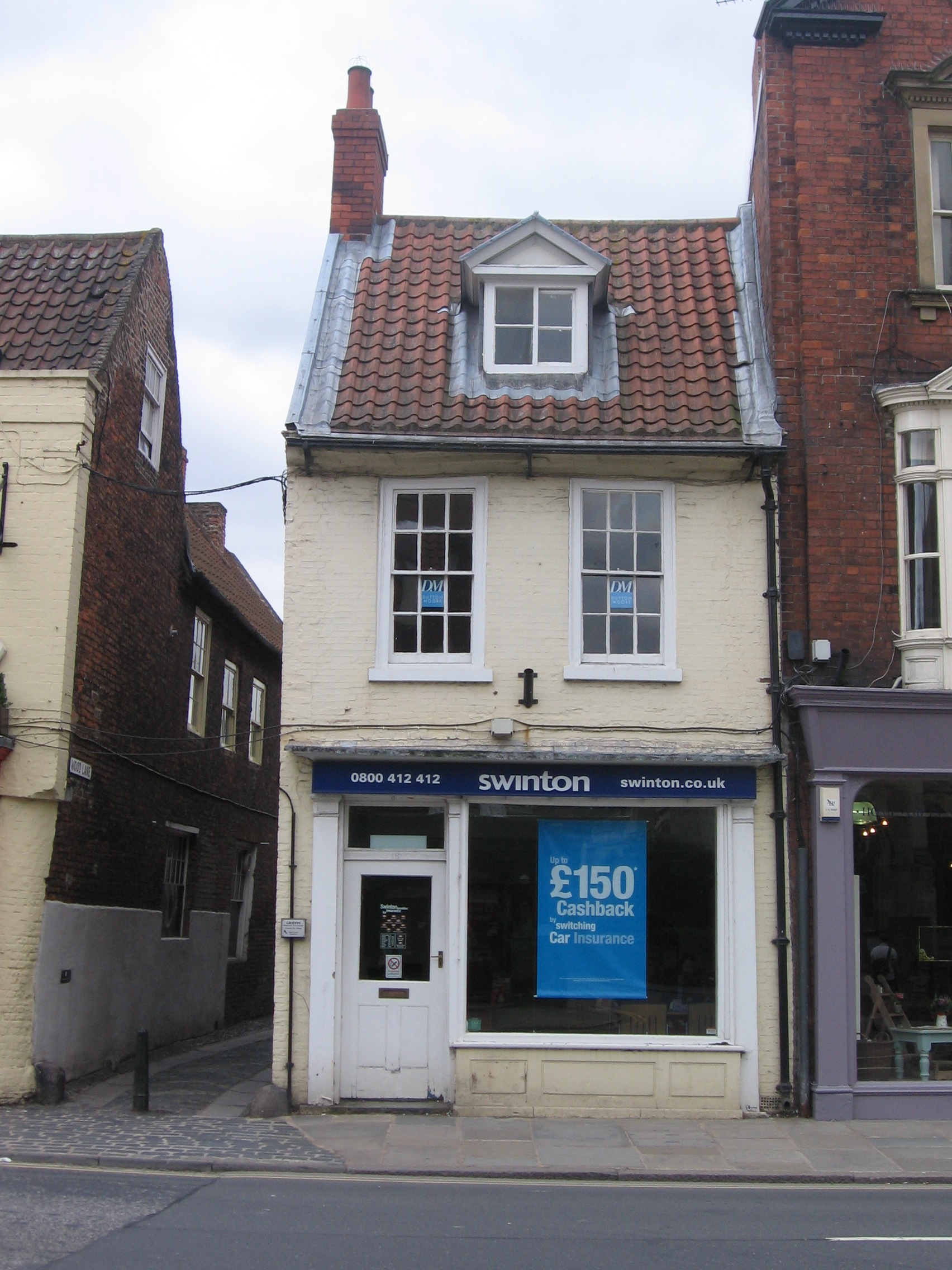
The building, in 2013

19 North Bar Within is a historic building in Beverley, a town in the East Riding of Yorkshire, in England.

The building was designed as a house by William Wrightson and constructed in about 1750. It is one of two Wrightson buildings on the street, the other being 35 North Bar Within. In the 19th century, the ground floor was converted into a shop, and a shopfront was inserted. The building was grade II* listed in 1950.

The building is constructed of brick, the front painted, with a moulded eaves cornice, and a pantile roof with stone moulded ogee kneelers. There are two storeys and attics, and two bays. On the ground floor is an early 19th-century shopfront with pilasters, an entablature, and a panelled base. The upper floor contains sash windows, and above is a dormer with a moulded pediment and a horizontally sliding sash window. Inside, the original staircase survives, and two first floor rooms have extensive original woodwork.

== See also ==
- Grade II* listed buildings in the East Riding of Yorkshire
- Listed buildings in Beverley (north area)
