= The Lord Nelson, Beverley =

Pub in Beverley, East Riding of Yorkshire, England

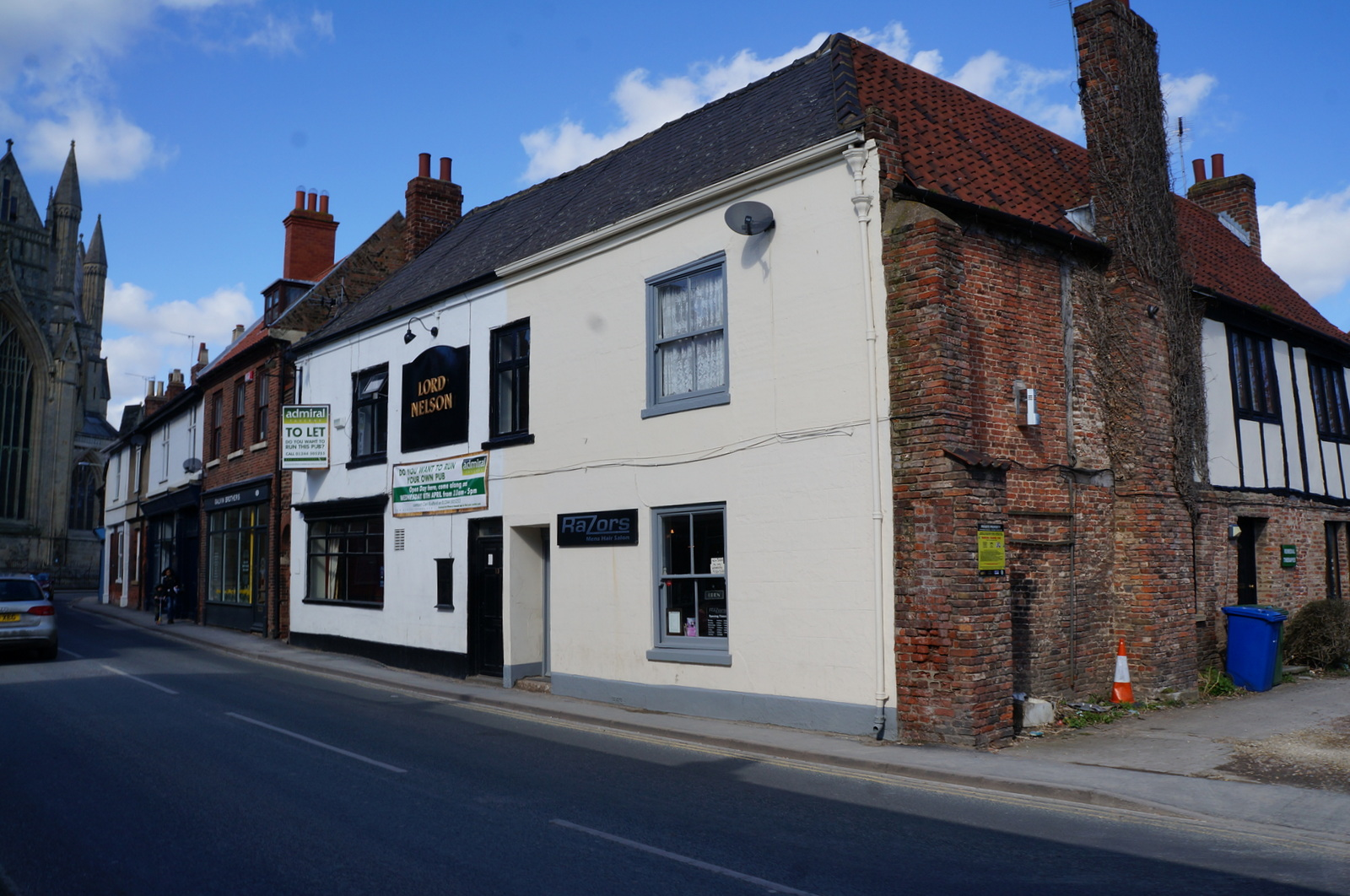
The pub, in 2015

The Lord Nelson is a historic pub in Beverley, a town in the East Riding of Yorkshire, in England.

The timber framed building was constructed around 1500. Probably in the late 17th century, a new range was constructed in front, doubling the size of the building. The building was altered in the 19th century, the work including a new front. The front range became a pub, while the rear range is a private house, 15 Flemingate. The building was grade II* listed in 1980. The windows and door on the east front were replaced around 1985. In 2017, Neil Pickford, a former verger of Beverley Minster, took over as the pub landlord.

The building is constructed of orange brick, rendered on the front, with exposed timber framing on the right wing, and a hipped roof in slate at the front and in pantile on the wing. It has two storeys and a U-shaped plan, with a front range of three bays. In the centre are two doorways, to the left is a pub window, and the other windows are sash window. On the wing is a doorway and modern casement windows. Inside, there is exposed timber framing including three roof trusses.

== See also ==
- Grade II* listed buildings in the East Riding of Yorkshire
- Listed buildings in Beverley (southeast area)
