= The Red House, Beverley =

House in Beverley, East Riding of Yorkshire, England

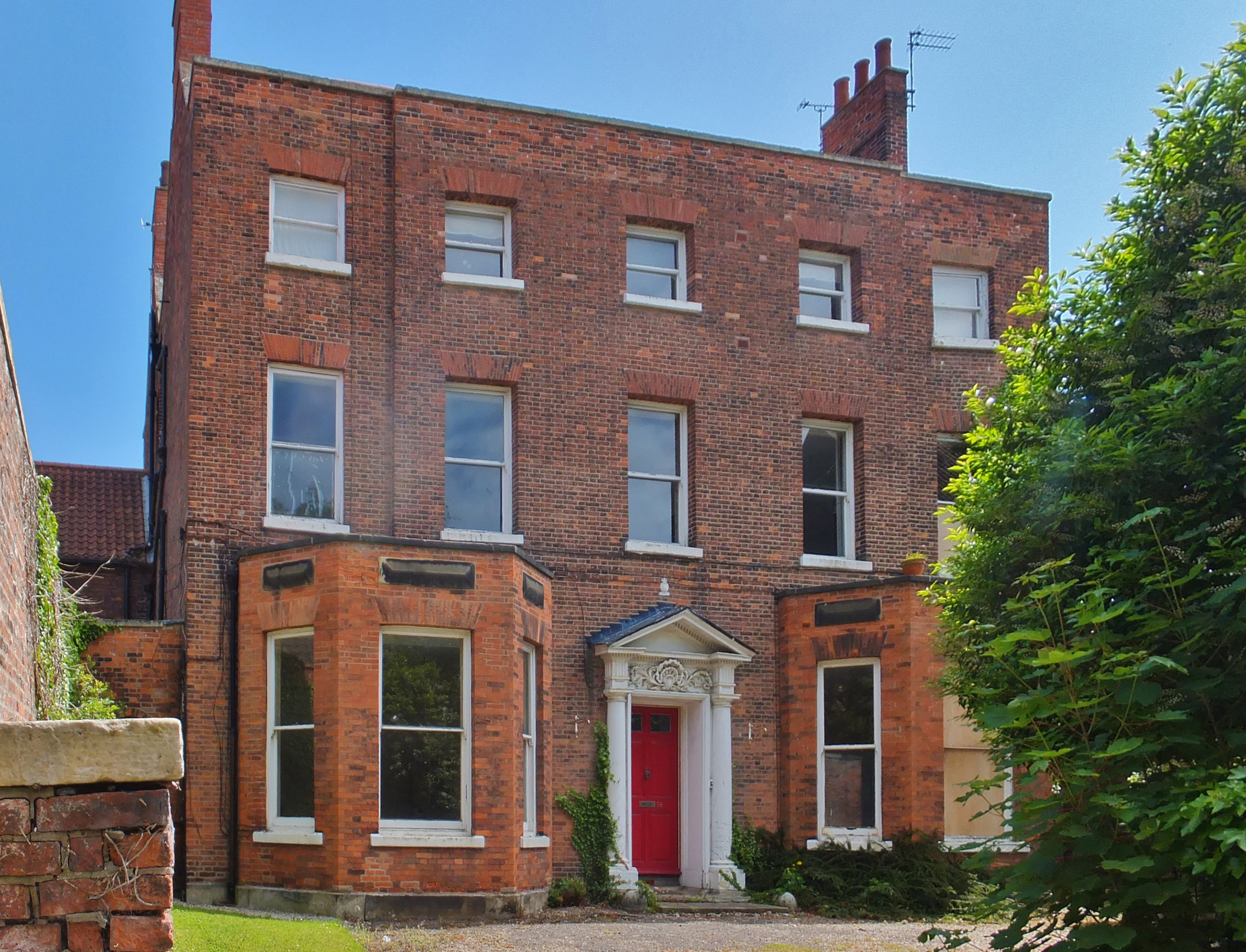
The building, in 2015

The Red House is a historic building in Beverley, a town in the East Riding of Yorkshire, in England.

The house was constructed in 1765, one of four grand 18th-century houses on North Bar Without. It was extended to the side in the early 19th century, then in the middle of the century, two bay windows were added to the ground floor of the front. It is set back from the set, with a large garden which was laid out in a parkland style. The building was grade II* listed in 1950.

The house is built of red brick, with a stone coped parapet, and a pantile roof with twin gable ends. It has three storeys and is five bays wide, the middle three bays projecting slightly. In the centre is a doorway with applied Doric columns, a decorated frieze, and a pediment. This is flanked by later three-sided bay windows, and the upper floors contain sash windows. Attached is a two-storey two-bay wing. Inside, there is an oval central hall with the original main staircase, and the original rear staircase also survives. One room has its original ceiling cornice while others have 19th-century plasterwork. There is a fire insurance mark for the Royal Exchange Assurance Corporation.

== See also ==
- Grade II* listed buildings in the East Riding of Yorkshire
- Listed buildings in Beverley (north area)
