= The Old Hall, Beverley =

Building in Beverley, East Riding of Yorkshire, England

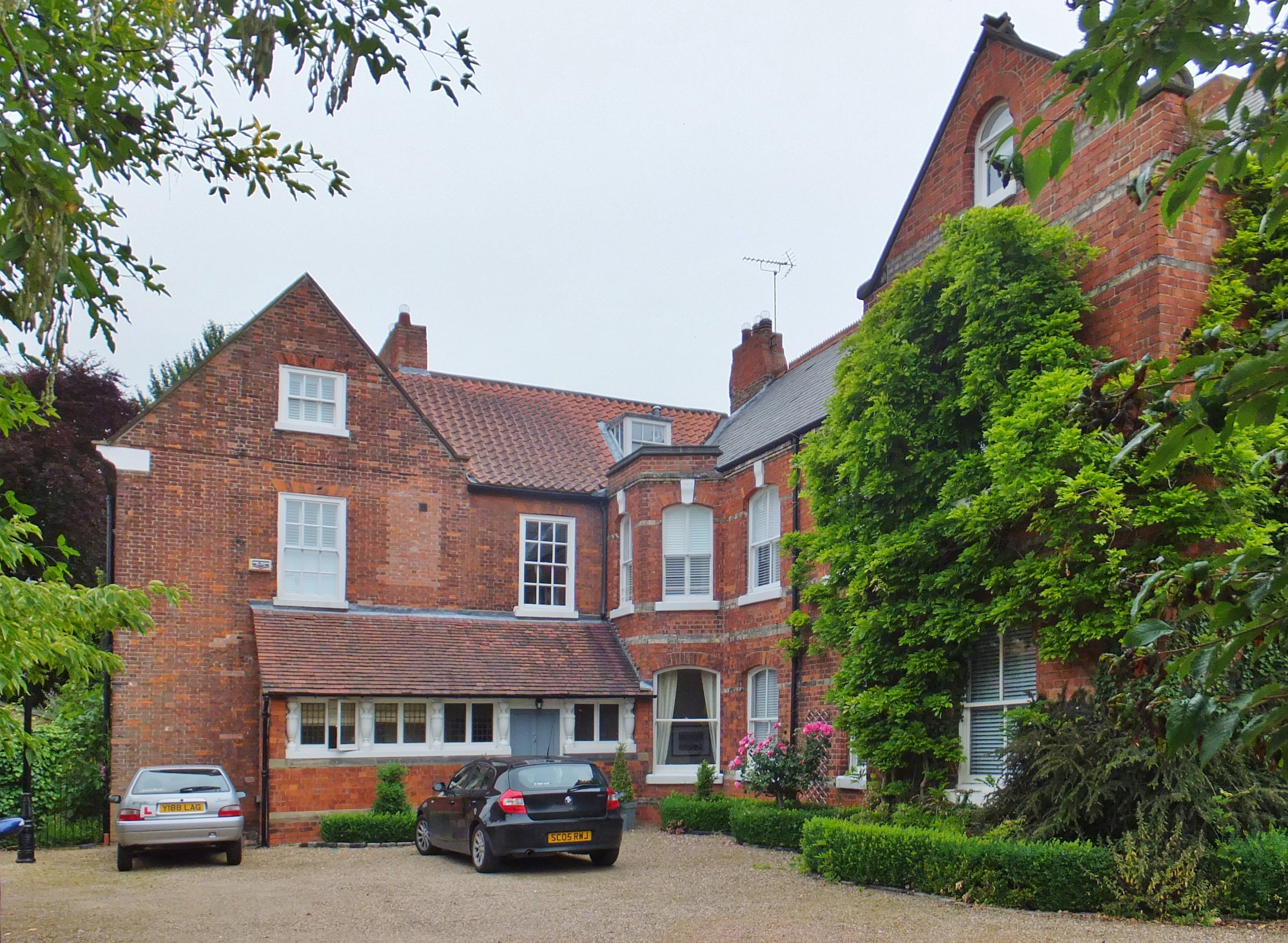
The building, in 2015

The Old Hall is a historic building in Beverley, a town in the East Riding of Yorkshire, in England.

The building was constructed in 1269, as the vicarage of St Mary's Church, Beverley. It was largely rebuilt between 1791 and 1792, and then in 1877 a rear wing was added, which included a parish room. In 1957, the house was divided, to provide a flat for the church's verger. In 1966, 15 Molescroft Road was purchased to serve as a new vicarage, and the main part of the house was sold as a private residence, with the remaining parish room and flat sold a few years later. The building was grade II listed in 1987.

The house is built of brick with a dentilled eaves cornice, and a pantile roof with coped gables and kneelers. It is two storeys high with attics. The original part is plain, and has sash windows.

== See also ==
- Listed buildings in Beverley (north area)
