= 56 and 58 Flemingate =

Building in Beverley, East Riding of Yorkshire, England

Coordinates: 53°50′19″N 0°25′06″W

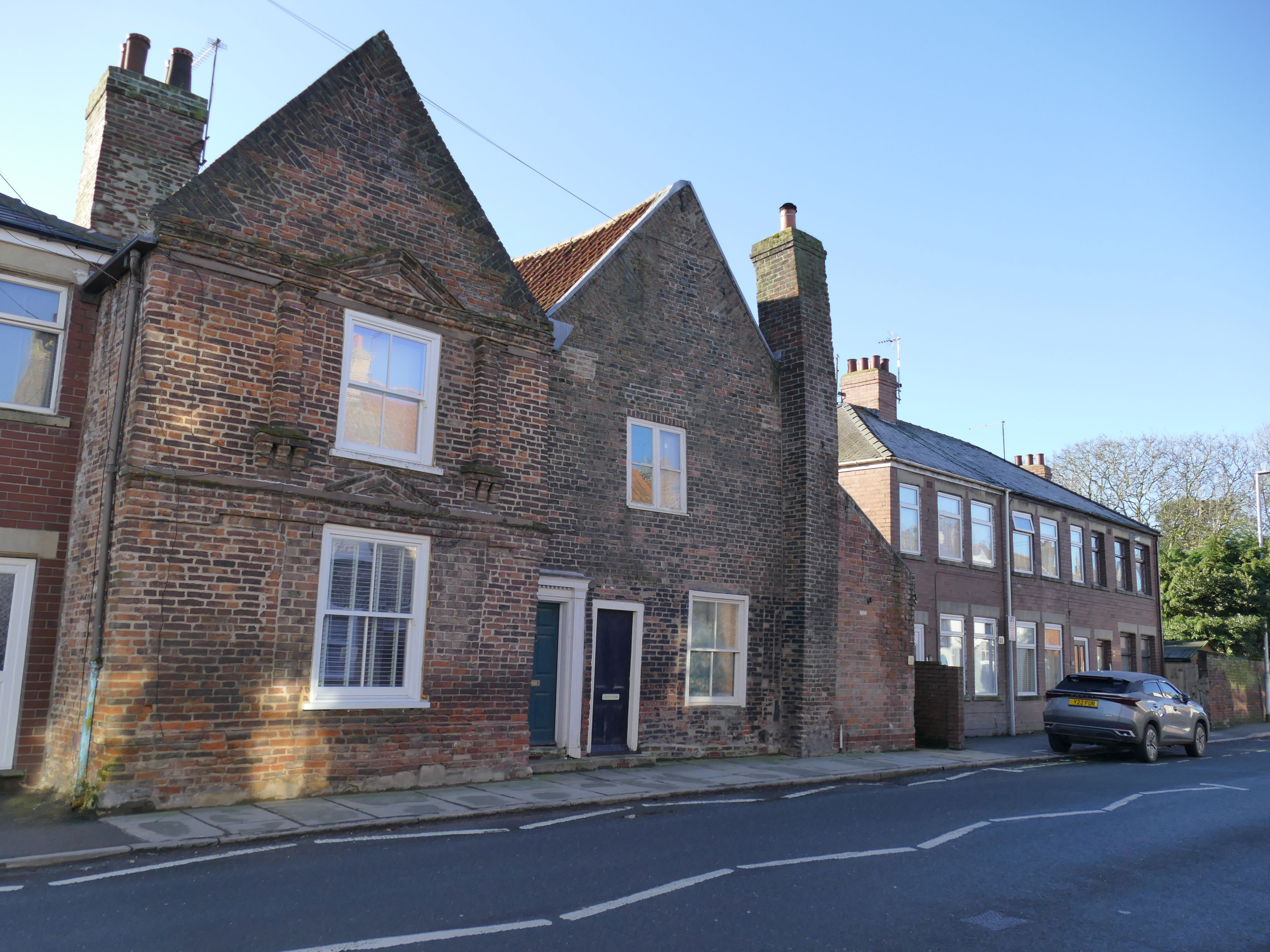
The building, in 2026

56 and 58 Flemingate is a historic building in Beverley, a town in the East Riding of Yorkshire, in England.

The building was constructed as a single house in the mid or late 17th century, in the artisan mannerist style. The east wing was later split off, as number 58, with the remainder of the house becoming number 56. The two parts of the building were separately grade II* listed in 1950. Local tradition claims that John Fisher was born at number 58, although the current building was not constructed until after his death.

The house is built of red brick, with a pantile roof and the gable end with tumbled brickwork facing the road. It has two storeys and each house is one bay wide. At number 56, the ground floor contains a doorway with a plain surround and a sash window to the right, above is an 18th-century window, and to the right is a tall chimneystack. At number 58, recessed on the right is a doorway with pilasters, a frieze and a cornice. On each floor is a sash window, and above each is a moulded string course and a pediment. Flanking the upper window are pilasters with Doric brick caps supported on corbels.

== See also ==
- Grade II* listed buildings in the East Riding of Yorkshire
- Listed buildings in Beverley (southeast area)
