= 5–13 Norfolk Street =

Building in Beverley, East Riding of Yorkshire, England

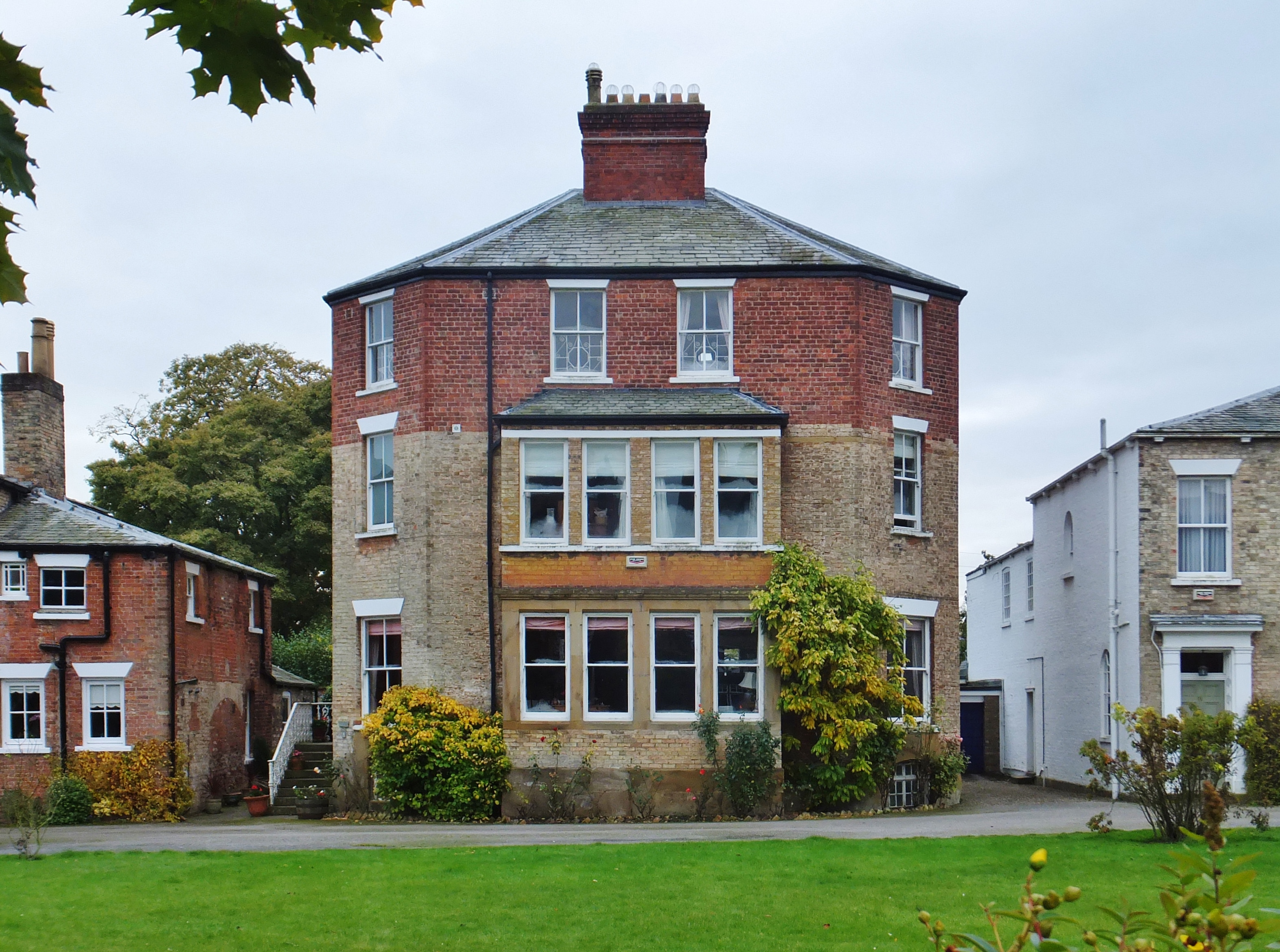
The building, in 2015

5–13 Norfolk Street, also known as Westfield, is a historic building in Beverley, a town in the East Riding of Yorkshire, in England.

A house of correction for the East Riding was constructed in Beverley in 1584. In 1611, it moved into Beverley Guildhall. A replacement was constructed between 1805 and 1810. It originally had 22 cells, with 4 added in 1814, 33 in 1820, and the conversion of other rooms into cells in 1835, when it reached a peak of 120 cells. In the 1860s, some cells were enlarged, reducing the number to 107, and it typically housed around 60 prisoned in the period. Other alterations included the construction of workshops in 1812 and a treadwheel in 1823. The prison closed in 1878, after which Marmaduke Whitton demolished part of the complex and converted the remainder into housing, to designed by his brother James. This building survives and was grade II listed in 1987.

The surviving complex consists of three buildings constructed of yellow brick. The outer buildings have two storeys and four bays, and contain sash windows with painted stucco lintels. The middle building has three storeys with canted corners and a hipped Welsh slate roof. In the centre is a two-storey rectangular bay window, and the porch is on the side. Inside, several pieces of prisoners' graffiti survive.

== See also ==
- Listed buildings in Beverley (north area)
