= The Elms, Beverley =

Building in Beverley, East Riding of Yorkshire, England

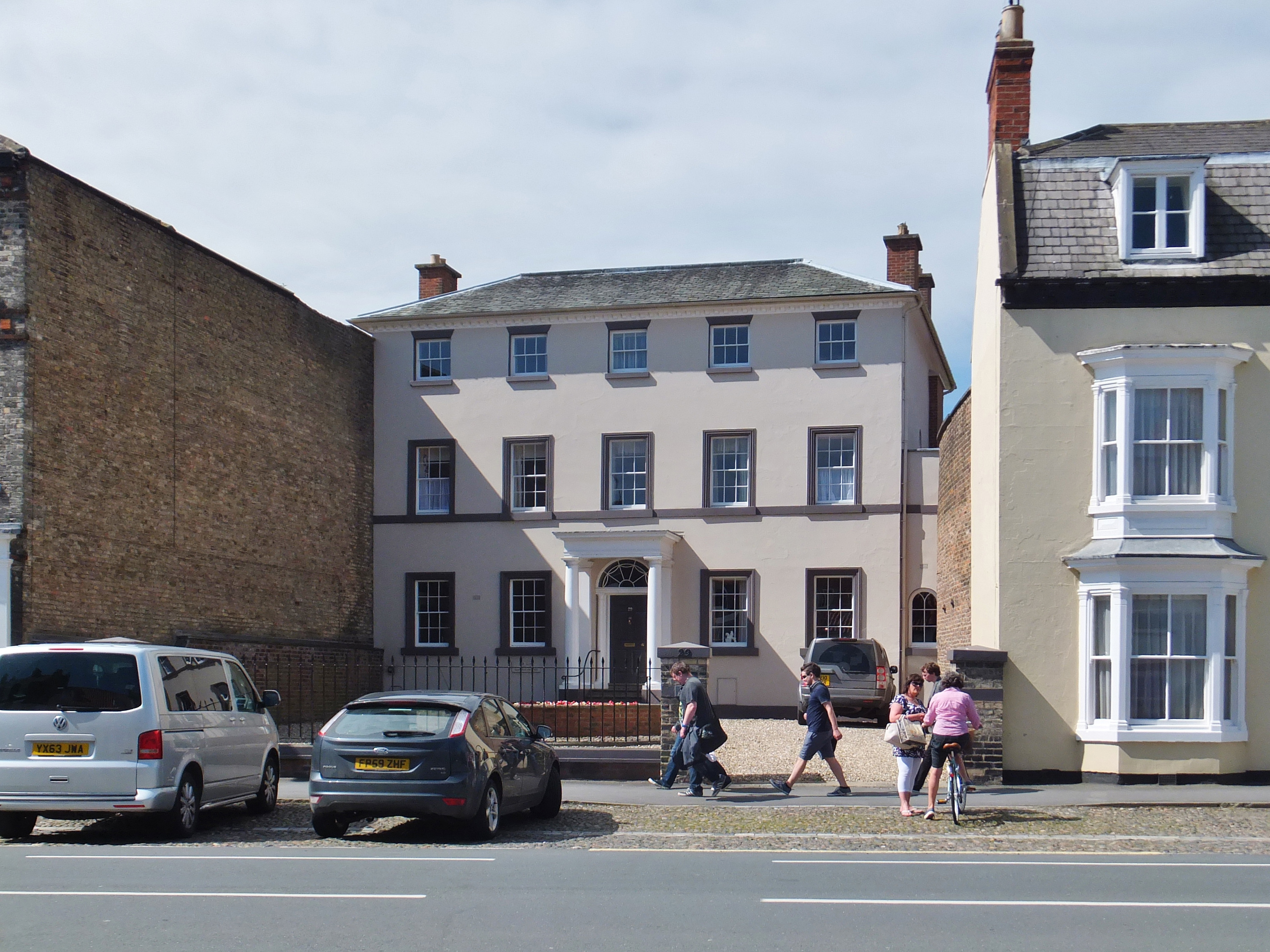
The building, in 2015

The Elms, also known as 29 North Bar Without, is a historic building in Beverley, a town in the East Riding of Yorkshire, in England.

The house was built in the 1730s, to a design probably by William Wrightson. It is one of four grand 18th-century houses on the street. A porch was added around 1800, and there were alterations in the Victorian period. The building was grade II* listed in 1969.

The house is stuccoed, and has a sill band, a cornice, a parapet, and a hipped slate roof. There are three storeys and cellars and five bays. In the centre is a Tuscan porch with two columns, and a doorway with columns below a transom, an entablature, and a wide arched fanlight. The windows are sashes, and on the side is a modillion cornice. Inside, the original staircase survives, described by Nikolaus Pevsner as "splendid". There is also an early chimneypiece in one ground floor room, while one first floor room has a chimneypiece probably carved by Frederick William Elwell.

== See also ==
- Grade II* listed buildings in the East Riding of Yorkshire
- Listed buildings in Beverley (north area)
