= 35 North Bar Within =

Building in Beverley, East Riding of Yorkshire, England

Coordinates: 53.8446°N 0.4349°W

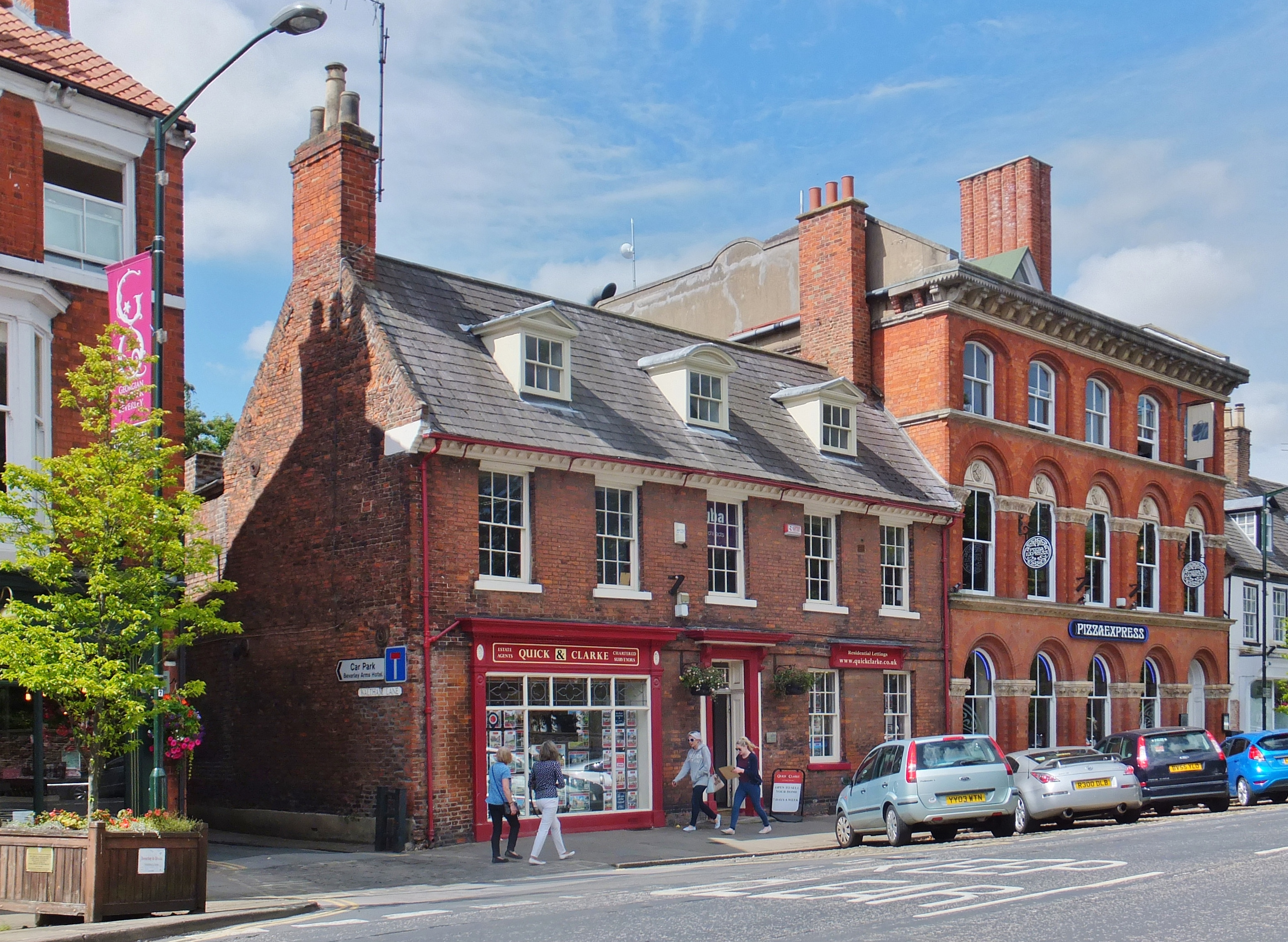
The building, in 2015

35 North Bar Within is a historic building in Beverley, a town in the East Riding of Yorkshire, in England.

The building was designed as a house by William Wrightson and constructed in about 1740. It is one of two Wrightson buildings on the street, the other being 19 North Bar Within. In the 19th century, the ground floor was converted into a shop, and a shopfront was inserted. The building was grade II* listed in 1950.

The building is constructed in red brick with a floor band, an ogee bracketed eaves cornice, and a steep slate roof. There are two storeys and attics, and five bays. In the centre is a doorway with a traceried fanlight and consoles. To its left is a shopfront with an entablature, carved pilasters with paterae, and a dentilled cornice, and to the right are two windows. The upper floor contains sash windows, and above are three dormers with pediments, the middle one segmental and the outer ones triangular. Inside, the original staircase survives - described by Nikolaus Pevsner as "excellent", and there is one chimneypiece from around 1800, possibly moved from elsewhere.

== See also ==
- Grade II* listed buildings in the East Riding of Yorkshire
- Listed buildings in Beverley (north area)
