= Beverley town walls =

Medieval fortifications in Yorkshire, England

- Beverley, East Riding of Yorkshire
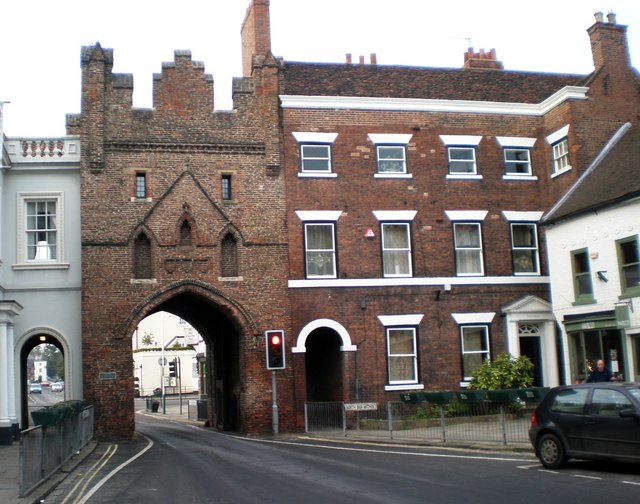
- North Bar gateway

Site information
- Type: Town wall

Location
- Shown within East Riding of Yorkshire
- Coordinates: 53.8442°N 0.4360°W
- Grid reference: grid reference TA030398

Beverley's town walls are a sequence of defensive structures built around the town of Beverley in the East Riding of Yorkshire, England.

== History ==
In the early medieval period, the town of Beverley was not walled. A "great ditch", later called Bar Dike, had been built on west side of the town by 1169, and by the 13th century there were a couple of formal gateways to the town: North Bar and South Bar (later called Keldgate Bar).

In 1322, however the town of Beverley petitioned parliament, requesting that they be allowed to build a protective town wall. Beverley had been attacked by the Scots in 1321 during the Wars of Scottish Independence and been ransomed from the Scots in early 1322. Other than the simple gates and ditches, the town was undefended. No action was taken, not least because of lack of interest from the Archbishop of York. In 1371, prompted by the threat of war with France, a commission examined the problem of Beverley's defences again, once again with little result.

At the beginning of the 15th century, during the reign of Henry IV, the political situation in England became unstable and further steps were taken to improve Beverley's defences. The Town Council had North Bar rebuilt in brick between 1409 and 1410, with a portcullis and parapets; the work cost £97 11d. Chains were bought to block entrances and streets, other gateways repaired with brick and iron, and additional "bars" – long pieces of timber – were acquired to protect the entrances to the town. By the time that the antiquarian John Leland visited in 1540, North Bar gate, Keldgate and the recently constructed Newbegin gate were all built in brick. These defences were insufficient, however, to prevent rebels entering the town in 1537.

In the 1640s civil war broke out between the supporters of Charles I and Parliament. The defences of Beverley were then reinforced with new ditches, the gatehouses were repaired and a garrison of 900 men guarded the town. Once again, these defences were not sufficient and Royalist forces were able to successfully raid the town. After the war the defences were neglected and ditches began to be filled in as the town expanded. Today only traces of the original ditches and the North Bar gate remain intact; the latter is considered by archaeologists Oliver Creighton and Robert Higham to be the "best surviving example in England of a brick-built town gate". The gatehouse is protected as a grade I listed building.

== See also ==
- Chester city walls
- List of town walls in England and Wales
- York city walls

== Bibliography ==
- Creighton, Oliver Hamilton; Higham, Robert (2005). Medieval Town Walls: an Archaeology and Social History of Urban Defence. Stroud, UK: Tempus. ISBN 978-0-7524-1445-4.
- Turner, Hilary (1971). Town Defences in England and Wales. London: John Baker. OCLC 463160092.
