= Royal Standard Inn =

Pub in Beverley, East Riding of Yorkshire, England

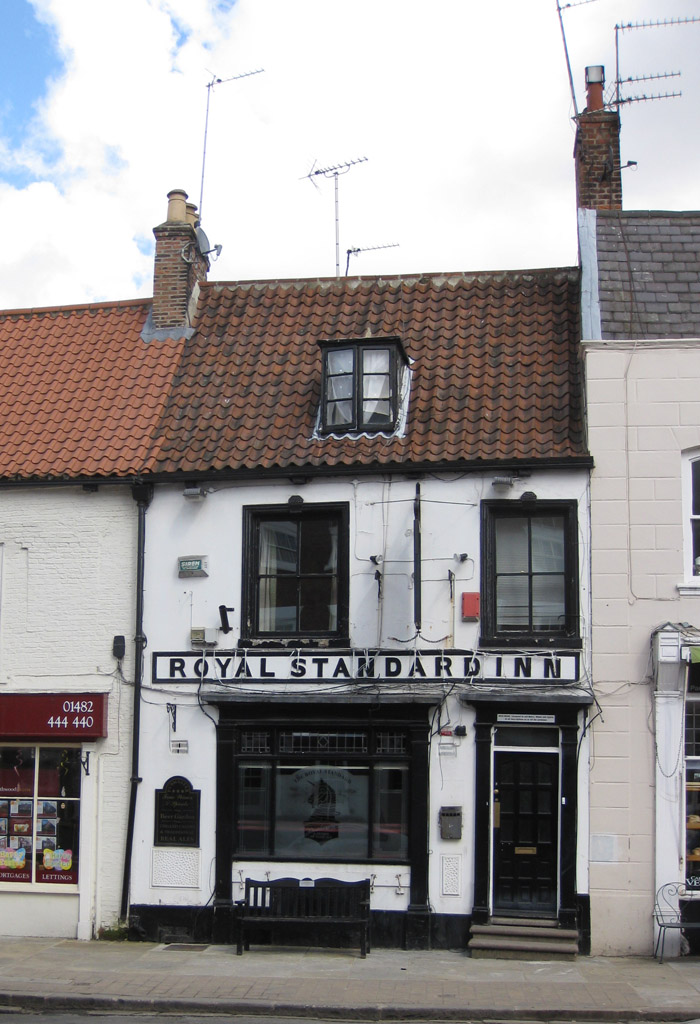
The pub, in 2013

The Royal Standard Inn is a historic pub in Beverley, a town in the East Riding of Yorkshire, in England.

The building may have been constructed in the 17th century, while the front was rebuilt in the early 18th century. It was converted into a pub, operating for a while as the "Turf Inn", before in 1875 becoming the Royal Standard. The building was grade II listed in 1969.

The pub has a timber framed core, while externally it is of painted stucco, with a gutter on wood block brackets, and a pantile roof. It has two storeys and an attic, and is two bays wide. The ground floor contains a doorway and a shop window with pilasters and entablatures, on the upper floor are sash windows, and on the roof is a flat-roofed dormer. Inside, there is a small front bar with bench seating, and a larger lounge bar.

== See also ==
- Listed buildings in Beverley (north area)
