= Ash Close =

Building in Beverley, East Riding of Yorkshire, England

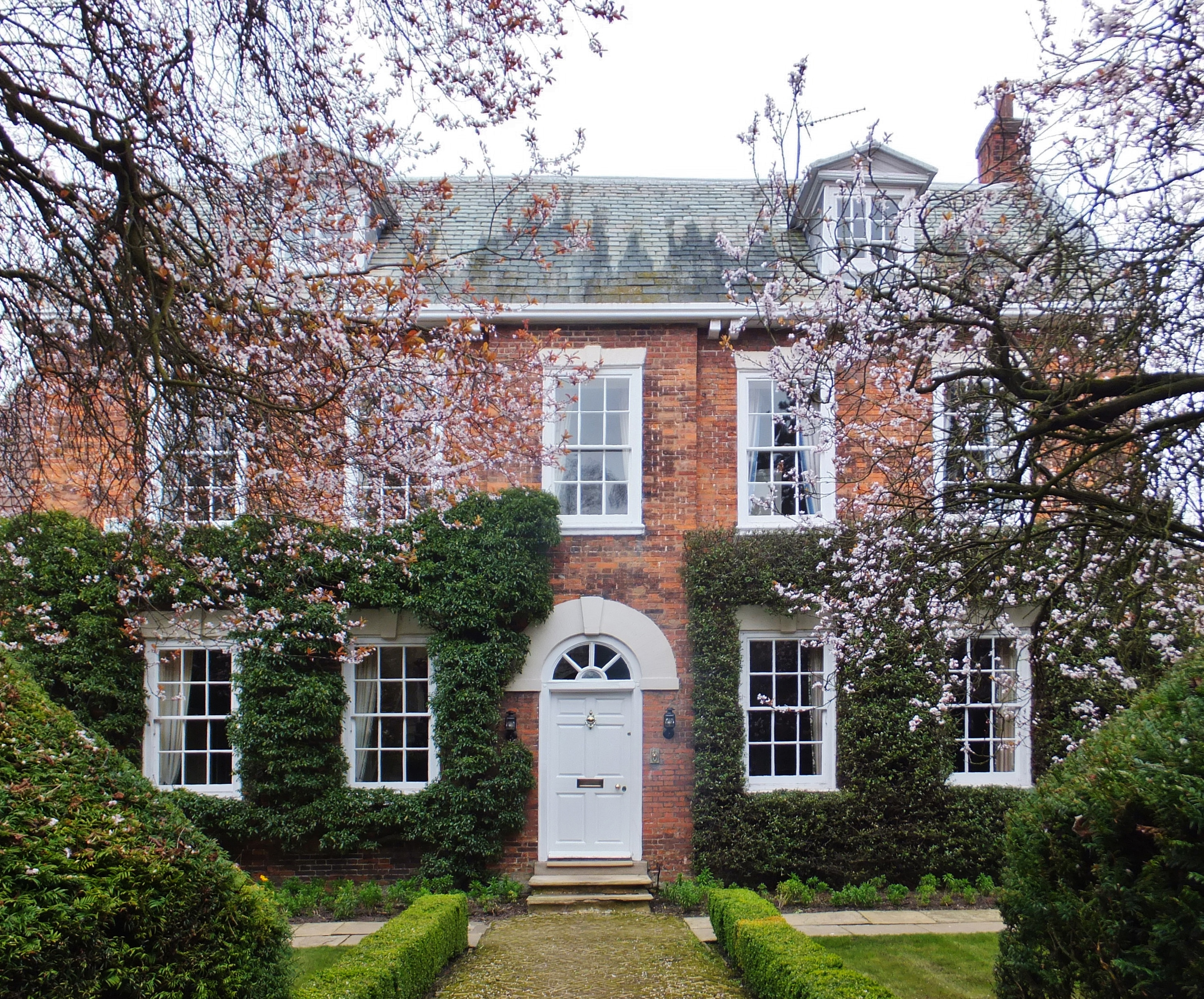
The building, in 2016

Ash Close, also known as 62 North Bar Without, is a historic building in Beverley, a town in the East Riding of Yorkshire, England.

The house was built in about 1732, and was later used as a town house by the Sykes family of Sledmere House. The cornice at roof level was replaced in the 19th century. It is one of four grand 18th-century houses on the street, and is set back behind a garden and wall. Alec Clifton-Taylor notes the house's similarities with 38 Highgate, at the other end of the town, while Nikolaus Pevsner describes it as "most attractive". The building was grade II* listed in 1950.

The house is built of red brick, with a cornice and a Westmorland slate roof. It has two storeys and is five bays wide, the middle bay projecting slightly, and later additions to the sides and rear. The central doorway has a round-arched head, a fanlight and a keystone. The windows are sashes with painted gauged voussoirs and keystones. On the roof are two pedimented dormers with horizontally sliding sashes, and at the rear are wrought iron railings. Inside, the original main and rear staircases survive, and there is widespread panelling. The first floor windows have built-in seats.

== See also ==
- Grade II* listed buildings in the East Riding of Yorkshire
- Listed buildings in Beverley (north area)
