= Rose and Crown, Bow =

Former pub in Bow, London

Coordinates: 51.527569°N 0.0177483°W

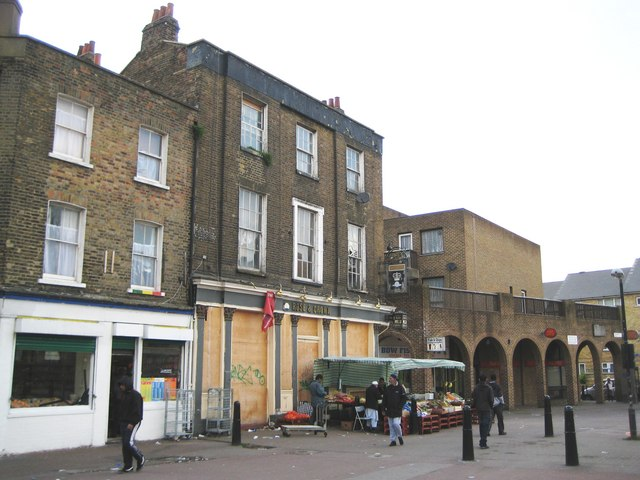
The Rose and Crown, 2008

The Rose and Crown is a former pub at 8 Stroudley Walk, Bow, London E3.

It is a Grade II listed building, dating back to the late 18th/early 19th century. The pub was originally called the Bowling Green Inn as it was opposite the village bowling green.

It closed as a pub in 2007, and is now the RSA Cash & Carry store.
