= Rose and Crown, St Albans =

Pub in St. Albans, Hertfordshire, England

Coordinates: 51°45′14″N 0°21′13″W

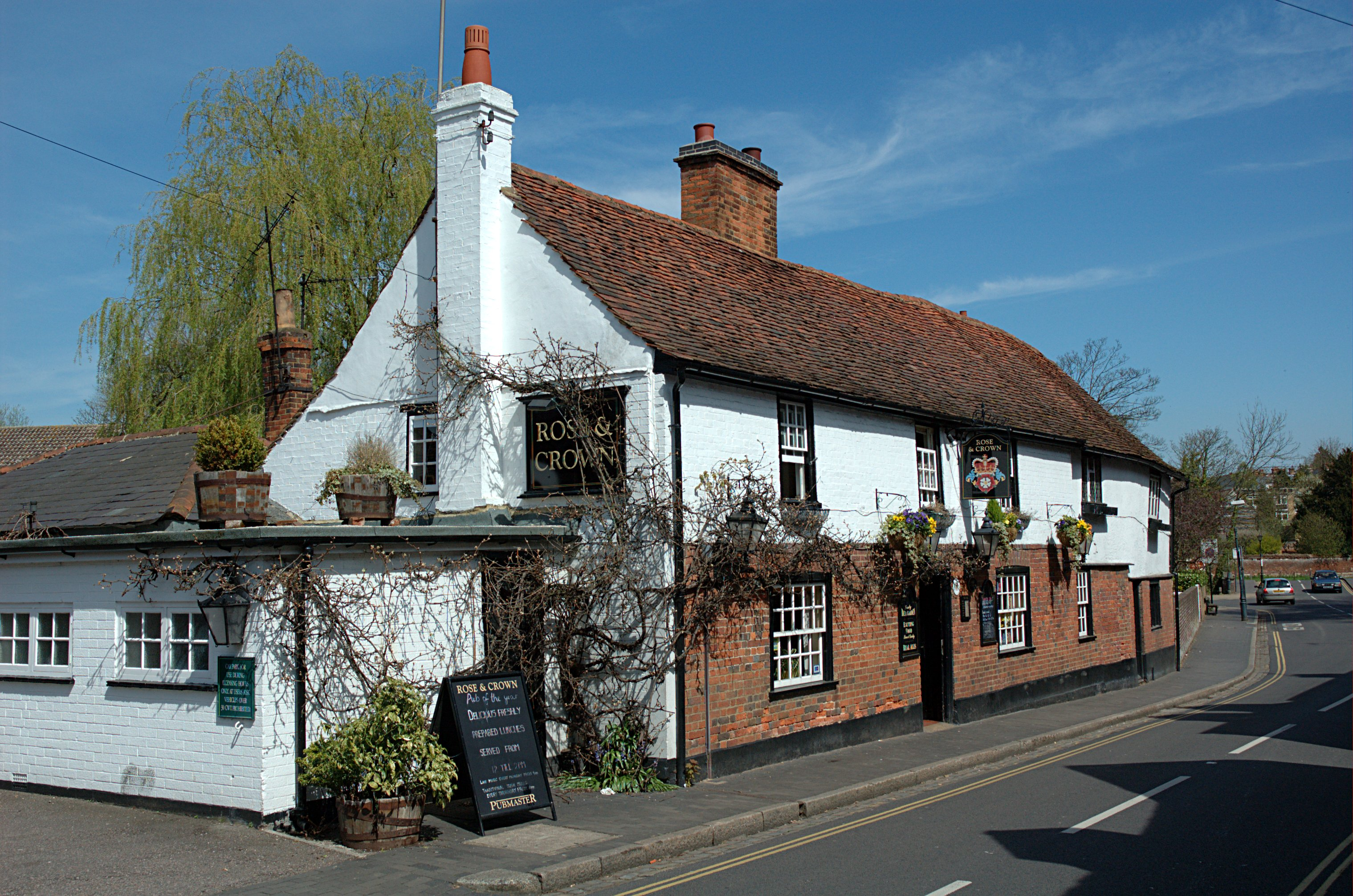
The Rose and Crown

The Rose and Crown is a public house in St Michael's Street, St Albans, Hertfordshire, England. The building appears to be eighteenth century and is listed Grade II with Historic England. It has been designated as an asset of community value.
