= Listed buildings in Beverley (southeast area) =

Beverley is a civil parish in the county of the East Riding of Yorkshire, England. It contains about 450 listed buildings that are recorded in the National Heritage List for England. Of these, eight are listed at Grade I, the highest of the three grades, 31 are at Grade II*, the middle grade, and the others are at Grade II, the lowest grade. The parish contains the market town of Beverley and the surrounding region. This list contains the listed buildings in the areas described by Pevsner and Neave as the southeast area, which includes Flemingate and Beckside and the adjacent streets. The area is mainly residential, and most of the listed buildings are houses, cottages and associated structures. The others include public houses, some later used for other purposes, a spire in a garden, shops, a bridge and an aqueduct, a gateway, a mounting block, a church and a drinking fountain.

== Key ==
Grade	Criteria
II*	Particularly important buildings of more than special interest
II	Buildings of national importance and special interest

== Buildings ==
Name and location	Photograph	Date	Notes	Grade
Crocketed spire, 24 Flemingate; 53.83885°N 0.42250°W	—	Medieval	The spire is in the garden to the east of the house. It is in carved stone, and consists of a crocketed pinnacle.	II
Lord Nelson and 15 Flemingate; 53.83924°N 0.42283°W		Late 15th or 16th century	The building has a timber framed core, with the front range dating from the 17th century. It is in orange brick, rendered on the front, with exposed timber framing on the right wing, and a hipped roof in slate at the front and in pantile on the wing. There are two storeys and a U-shaped plan, with a front range of three bays. In the centre are two doorways, to the left is a pub window, and the other windows are sash window. On the wing is a doorway and modern casement windows. Inside, there is exposed timber framing.	II*
3 Flemingate; 53.83929°N 0.42335°W		16th or 17th century	The shop has a timber framed core, it was later encased, it is rough rendered and has a pantile roof. There are two storeys and two bays. On the ground floor is a modern shopfront, and the upper floor has sash windows with rusticated lintels.	II
5–9 Flemingate; 53.83927°N 0.42317°W		16th or 17th century	A row of two houses and a shop with a timber framed core, they were later encased in brick and partly rendered. The buildings have a slate roof, two storeys and four bays. There are two doorways with rectangular fanlights, and a modern shopfront. The windows are also modern.	II
56 Flemingate; 53.83858°N 0.41840°W		Mid to late 17th century	The house is in red brick, with a pantile roof and the gable end with tumbled brickwork facing the road. There are two storeys and one bay. The ground floor contains a doorway with a plain surround and a sash window to the right, above is an 18th-century window, and to the right is a tall chimneystack.	II*
58 Flemingate; 53.83860°N 0.41833°W		Mid to late 17th century	The house is in red brick, with a pantile roof and the gable end with tumbled brickwork facing the road. There are two storeys and one bay. Recessed on the right is a doorway with pilasters, a frieze and a cornice. On each floor is a sash window, and above each is a moulded string course and a pediment. Flanking the upper window are pilasters with Doric brick caps supported on corbels.	II*
36–40 Beckside; 53.83914°N 0.41469°W		Early 18th century {probable)	The buildings are in rendered brick with a pantile roof. There are two storeys and four bays. On the ground floor are two doorways with pilasters, friezes and cornices. Between them are a passage entry, a carriage entrance, a shop window and a sash window. The upper floor contains a modern window and three horizontally sliding sash windows.	II
65 Flemingate; 53.83884°N 0.41755°W		Early 18th century	The house is in brick, rendered below plinth height, with a plastered eaves cornice and iron brackets, and a pantile roof with tumbled brickwork on the gable ends. There are two storeys and three bays, and a rear wing. The central doorway has pilasters, a rectangular fanlight, an entablature and a cornice, and to the right is an inset foot scraper. The windows are sashes, those on the ground floor with painted lintels.	II
27 Beckside; 53.83928°N 0.41479°W		18th century	The house is rendered, on a brick plinth, and has a hipped Welsh slate roof. There are two storeys and three bays. In the centre is a carriage entrance, and the windows are sashes.	II
11 Flemingate; 53.83922°N 0.42300°W		18th century	The shop is in brick, with a dentilled eaves cornice, and a pantile roof with tumbled brick on the gable ends. There are two storeys and attics, and three bays. On the ground floor is a modern shopfront, the upper floor contains sash windows with brick voussoirs, and there is a flat-roofed dormer.	II
47–53 Flemingate; 53.83873°N 0.41848°W		18th century	A terrace of four houses that was refronted in the early 19th century. The front is in white brick, elsewhere there is red brick, and it has a pantile roof with tumbled brickwork on the gable ends. There are two storeys and four bays. On the front are four doorways, three with rectangular fanlights, and most of the windows are sashes. At the rear the windows have segmental heads.	II
59 Flemingate; 53.83879°N 0.41806°W		18th century	The house was refronted in the early 19th century. It is in painted brick, and has a slate roof with coped gables and kneelers. There are two storeys and two bays, and a rear wing with tumbled brickwork. The central doorway has narrow pilasters, a rectangular fanlight and a cornice on brackets. The windows are sashes with rendered lintels.	II
63 Flemingate; 53.83881°N 0.41783°W		18th century	The house is rendered, and has a pantile roof with coped gables and kneelers. On the gable ends is tumbled brickwork. There are two storeys and five bays. The central doorway has panelled pilasters, a rectangular fanlight and a cornice, and the windows are sashes.	II
Former Buck Public House; 53.83927°N 0.41498°W		18th century	The public house, later converted for residential use, is in brick with a hipped pantile roof. There are two storeys and attics, and four bays. The doorway has pilasters, an entablature, a rectangular fanlight and a cornice, and to the right is a carriage entrance. Most of the windows are modern, and there are two gabled dormers.	II
The Sloop Public House; 53.83911°N 0.41433°W		18th century	The public house is rendered and has a pantile roof. There are two storeys and three bays. Steps with iron rails lead up to the central doorway that has a plain surround. On the upper floor are sash windows, and the ground floor windows are modern.	II
66 Beckside; 53.83913°N 0.41315°W		Late 18th century	The house is in red brick, and has a pantile roof with coped gables and kneelers. There are two storeys and two bays, and a rear wing with a dentilled cornice. The central doorway has narrow pilasters and a cornice on grooved brackets. The windows are sashes, those on the ground floor with stucco lintels.	II
Fleming House; 53.83827°N 0.41959°W		c. 1800	The house, later used for other purposes, is in red brick, with stone dressings, a sill band, paired eaves brackets, and a hipped slate roof. There are two storeys and an entrance front of three bays. In the centre is a doorway with Doric columns, an entablature with pilasters, a moulded architrave, a semicircular fanlight, a decorated frieze and a cornice. The windows are sashes with channelled heads and keystones.	II
Wall to Fleming House; 53.83847°N 0.41957°W		c. 1800	The wall running along the forecourt of the house is in brick with rendered coping. It contains five brick piers with stone caps.	II
42 and 44 Beckside; 53.83913°N 0.41447°W		18th or early 19th century	A pair of houses in brick with a pantile roof. There are two storeys and three bays. In the centre are two doorways approached by steps, flanking a round-arched passage doorway with a keystone. The windows are sashes, and the openings have stucco lintels.	II
70 Beckside; 53.83910°N 0.41287°W		Late 18th or early 19th century	The house is in brick with a pantile roof. There are two storeys and two bays. The central doorway has a three-light fanlight, and the windows are sashes, those on the ground floor with segmental arches.	II
Bridge and aqueduct 53.83969°N 0.39604°W		1801	The aqueduct carries Beverley Beck over the Barmston Drain, and is in brick with stone dressings. At the base are three small segmental arches with keystones and rounded stone cutwaters. Above, are two bands, and a brick parapet with stone coping.	II
19 and 21 Flemingate; 53.83897°N 0.42134°W		1825	Warehouses and offices later converted for residential use, they are in brown brick with a pantile roof. There are two storeys and five bays, and an extension to the right of four bays. In the original part is a segmental-arched carriage entry. The windows are sashes, most with segmental heads and brick voussoirs, and on the upper floor of the extension they have flat heads and wooden lintels. To the right is a recessed house with two storeys and three bays, a sill band and coped gables. In the centre is a doorway with a rectangular fanlight, the windows are sashes, and all the openings have rendered lintels.	II
32 and 34 Beckside; 53.83914°N 0.41486°W		Early 19th century	The house is in painted brick with a pantile roof. There are two storeys and two bays. The doorway on the left has a rectangular fanlight. The windows are modern, and the ground floor openings have segmental heads.	II
68 Beckside; 53.83911°N 0.41297°W		Early 19th century	The house is rendered and painted, and has a sill band and a pantile roof. There are two storeys and one bay. The doorway on the left has a rectangular fanlight, and the ground floor openings have segmental heads.	II
4–7 Beckside North; 53.83944°N 0.41348°W		Early 19th century	A terrace of four houses in brick with a pantile roof. There are two storeys and five bays. The doorways have divided fanlights, and there is a passage entry with an arched head and a keystone. The windows are sashes, the ground floor openings have stucco lintels, and there are four dormers, two gabled and two with flat roofs.	II
8 Beckside North; 53.83945°N 0.41327°W		Early 19th century	The house is in brick with a pantile roof. There are three storeys and two bays. The doorway in the right bay has thin pilasters, a three-light rectangular fanlight, and grooved brackets. The windows are sashes with brick voussoirs.	II
Former Mariners Arms Public House; 53.83901°N 0.41602°W		Early 19th century	The public house, later used for other purposes, is rendered, and has a Welsh slate roof. There are two storeys and three bays. On the ground floor is a public house front, with two doorways and three windows flanked by pilasters, and the upper floor contains sash windows.	II
Gateway, Beverley Gas Works; 53.83838°N 0.41193°W		c. 1826	The gateway consists of a sandstone archway about 20 feet (6.1 m) in width and 25 feet (7.6 m) in height. The semicircular arch is flanked by paired Doric pilasters. There is a continuous entablature and an architrave with guttae, a plain cornice and a blocking course.	II]
Figham House; 53.83823°N 0.40950°W		c. 1830–50	The house was later extended to the northwest. The original part is in red and grey brick, with paired eaves brackets and a hipped slate roof. There are two storeys, the entrance front has three bays, and there are two bays on the left return. In the centre is a porch with Ionic columns, Doric pilasters, and an entablature with a blocking course, and the doorway has a rectangular fanlight. The windows are sashes with incised voussoirs and keystones. Three bays of the extension project under a pediment, and contain a porch with Roman Ionic columns, and a doorway with a radial fanlight.	II
Fern Lodge; 53.84370°N 0.41181°W		Mid-19th century	A cottage orné in Gothic style, it is in brick, with overhanging eaves and a Welsh slate roof. There are two storeys and two bays. In the centre is a gabled porch, and a doorway with a rectangular hood mould and ornamental hinges. The windows have three arched lights and rectangular hood moulds.	II
Flemingate House; 53.83866°N 0.42088°W		Mid-19th century	A pair of houses in Gothic style in red brick with a Welsh slate roof. There are two storeys and three bays, the middle bay taller and projecting under a gable with carved bargeboards and a finial, containing a carriage entry converted into a window. The doorways are arched and have arched fanlights, and the windows are also arched, with two or three cusped lights. To the right is an office extension with nine bays, containing segmental-headed pivoting windows.	II
Mounting block 53.83858°N 0.42036°W		19th century (probable)	The mounting block is on the pavement outside 38 Flemingate. It is in stone, and consists of two worn steps. Formerly, it carried a cast iron plaque with the distance to Hull.	II
61 Grovehill Road; 53.84209°N 0.41896°W		c. 1877	The house is in red brick with a Welsh slate roof. There are two storeys and three bays. The central doorway has panelled pilasters, carved moulding, a rectangular fanlight, brackets with swags, and a cornice. This is flanked by canted bay windows, and the other windows are sashes with rusticated lintels and keystones.	II
St Nicholas' Church; 53.84130°N 0.41478°W		1879–80	The church is built in sandstone and has a red tile roof. It consists of a nave with a clerestory, a south aisle, a chancel, and a southwest tower incorporating a porch with a pointed south doorway. Above the doorway are louvred bell openings, and arcaded parapets and pinnacles.	II
Drinking fountain and horse trough 53.83923°N 0.41280°W		c. 1890	The drinking fountain and the trough are in polished granite. The drinking fountain consists of a pier with a segmental pediment. On both sides there is a round-headed arch; on the south side it contains a bronze plaque, and on the north side there is a metal tap and a projecting basin. The trough is D-shaped, with rounded coping, and there are two lower drinking troughs for dogs.	II

== See also ==
- Listed buildings in Beverley (central and northeast areas)
- Listed buildings in Beverley (south area)
- Listed buildings in Beverley (west and southwest areas)
- Listed buildings in Beverley (north area)
