= Listed buildings in Beverley (north area) =

Beverley is a civil parish in the county of the East Riding of Yorkshire, England. It contains about 450 listed buildings that are recorded in the National Heritage List for England. Of these, eight are listed at Grade I, the highest of the three grades, 31 are at Grade II*, the middle grade, and the others are at Grade II, the lowest grade. The parish contains the market town of Beverley and the surrounding region. This list contains the listed buildings in the area described by Pevsner and Neave as the north area,, which include North Bar Within, North Bar Without, York Road, New Walk, Molescroft and the adjcent streets. The area is divided into two parts by the North Bar. The part to its south is largely commercial, and contains shops, public houses, a hotel and a former bank. The northern part is largely residential, and most of the listed buildings are houses and associated structures. The others include churches, associated structures and a presbytery, public houses, a court house, lamp standards, a former gaol complex, a water pump and a urinal,

== Key ==
Grade	Criteria
I	Buildings of exceptional interest, sometimes considered to be internationally important
II*	Particularly important buildings of more than special interest
II	Buildings of national importance and special interest

== Buildings ==
Name and location	Photograph	Date	Notes	Grade
St Mary's Church; 53.84416°N 0.43376°W		12th century	The church has been altered and extended through the centuries, it is built in magnesian limestone and has a lead roof. The church has a cruciform plan, consisting of a nave, north and south aisles, a south porch, north and south transepts with a northeast chapel and a southeast aisle, a chancel with a northeast chapel, and a tower at the crossing. The nave, transepts and chancel have clerestories. Much of the church has embattled parapets and crocketed pinnacles. The tower has two stages, an oculus on each face of the lower stage, and a four-light bell opening above. On the south transept are flying buttresses, and at the west end is a pointed doorway above which is a seven-light window, flanked by polygonal buttresses with pierced upper stages and openwork parapets.	I
The Old Hall; 53.84355°N 0.43648°W		Late 13th century	The house, at one time St Mary's Vicarage, has been much altered, particularly in the late 19th century. It is in brick with a dentilled eaves cornice, and a pantile roof with coped gables and kneelers. The original part is plain, and has sash windows.	II
Beverley North Bar and Bar House; 53.84499°N 0.43592°W		1409	The gatehouse at the north entrance to the town is in brick, and consists of a depressed pointed arch with a room above. Both fronts have cogged embattled parapets and string courses, shields and niches. On the north face are buttresses and a cartouche of arms. To the west is a house in stuccoed brick, with two storeys, a floor band, a moulded eaves cornice, and a parapet with vase-shaped balusters. Associated with the house are a garden wall, piers and railings.	I
St Mary's Court; 53.84439°N 0.43536°W		15th century (probable)	The building is timber framed, with painted stone infill and a pantile roof. There are two storeys and three bays, the upper storey on the left return jettied. On the ground floor is an inserted modern shopfront, and above are two sash windows and one fixed light window.	II*
32 North Bar Within; 53.84491°N 0.43555°W		17th century	The shop has a timber framed core, and it was refronted in 1736. It is in painted brick, with a wood gutter on block brackets, and a pantile roof. There are two storeys and an attic, and two bays. On the ground floor is a mid-19th century shopfront, the upper floor contains sash windows and there is a gabled dormer.	II
34 and 36 North Bar Within; 53.84496°N 0.43561°W		17th century	A pair of shops with a timber framed core that were refronted in 1736. They are in painted brick with an eaves cornice and a pantile roof. There are two storeys and attics, and three bays. In the centre is a recessed entrance flanked by shopfronts. The right shop has a slightly bowed window, reeded pilasters with consoles and an entablature. The left shop has an entablature and a moulded cornice. There are two gabled dormers.	II
Royal Standard Inn; 53.84483°N 0.43549°W		17th century (possible)	The public house has a timber framed core, and was refronted in the early 18th century. It is in painted stucco, with a gutter on wood block brackets, and a pantile roof. There are two storeys and an attic, and two bays. The ground floor contains a doorway and a shop window with pilasters and entablatures, on the upper floor are sash windows, and on the roof is a flat-roofed dormer.	II
18 and 20 North Bar Within; 53.84377°N 0.43367°W		c. 1700	A pair of shops in painted brick, with a stone coped parapet and a pantile roof. There are three storeys and two bays. On the ground floor are two shopfronts, between which is a doorway that has an open pediment with rosettes in the soffit on boldly carved consoles. The upper floors contain sash windows.	II*
11 North Bar Within; 53.84352°N 0.43370°W		Early 18th century	The shop is in painted brick, with a bracketed eaves cornice, and a steep pantile roof. There are two storeys and attics, and two bays. On the ground floor is a modern shopfront, and the upper floor contains sash windows.	II
13 North Bar Within; 53.84355°N 0.43375°W		Early 18th century	The shop is in painted brick, with an eaves soffit on four shaped brackets, and a steep slate roof with tumbled brickwork on the gable end. There are two storeys and attics, and two narrow bays. On the ground floor is a shopfront, the upper floor has sash windows, and there is a segmental-headed dormer.	II
22 North Bar Within; 53.84382°N 0.43374°W		Early 18th century	The building, on a corner site, is in red brick, the front facing North Bar Within stuccoed on the left return, with a floor band, an eaves cornice on four corbels, and a pantile roof with a coped gable and kneeler on the left. There are three storeys and three bays. The ground floor has a shopfront with three Doric pilasters, a bow window and a shaped bracketed cornice. The front facing Hengate is stuccoed and has two storeys and attics, and four bays. It contains a doorway with a fanlight, and two gabled dormers, and the other windows on both fronts are sashes.	II*
23 and 23A North Bar Within; 53.84380°N 0.43420°W		Early 18th century	The shop is in painted brick, with an ogee bracketed eaves cornice and a tile roof. There are two storeys and an attic, and four bays. The ground floor contains a shopfront on a modern stone plinth, on the upper floor are three sash windows and a blind window on the left, and above is a gabled dormer.	II
28 North Bar Within; 53.84480°N 0.43537°W		Early 18th century	The building is in scored stucco on brick, and has a parapet with moulded stone coping, and a slate roof. There are two storeys and attics, and six bays. The ground floor contains two shopfronts, between which is a doorway with a segmental head and a divided fanlight, approached by steps with wrought iron rails and scrapers. On the upper floor are sashes with segmental heads and keystones, and above are three dormers with segmental heads.	II
34 and 36 North Bar Without; 53.84588°N 0.43725°W		Early 18th century (probable)	A pair of houses with rough render and applied timber framing, a pantile roof, and two storeys and attics. The left house has one bay, and a round-arched doorway flanked by windows with pointed heads. The right house has two bays, and contains a doorway with a plain surround and a rectangular fanlight, to its right is a segmental-headed window, and further to the right is a round-arched passage entry. The upper floor of both houses contains sash windows, and there are two flat-roofed dormers.	II
52 and 54 North Bar Without; 53.84630°N 0.43771°W		Early 18th century	A pair of houses in brown brick, with wood spouting on widely spaced eaves brackets, and a pantile roof. There are two storeys and attics, and two bays. On the front are two doorways, each with pilasters, an entablature, and a rectangular ornamental fanlight. The windows are sashes with rendered lintels, and there are two flat-roofed dormers.	II
58 and 60 North Bar Without; 53.84658°N 0.43809°W		Early 18th century	The houses are in red brick, and have a pantile roof with tumbled brickwork on the gable ends. There are two storeys and attics, and two bays, The doorways are in the centre, and the windows are horizontally sliding sash windows; the ground floor openings with segmental heads. On the roof are two flat-roofed dormers with casement windows.	II
St Mary's Manor; 53.84461°N 0.43457°W		Early 18th century	The earliest part is the north wing, with most of the house added in about 1803, and a later south wing. The north wing is in painted brick, and the rest of the house is in painted stucco, with wide spreading eaves and hipped Westmorland slate roofs. There are two storeys, the main block has five bays, the south wing has one bay and the north wing has three. In the centre is a tetrastyle Roman Doric porch, and a doorway with a reeded architrave with paterae, and a rectangular ornamental fanlight. On the ground floor are casement windows with consoles and a cornice, and the other windows are sashes, some with consoles and cornices. At the rear is a three-bay bowed centre.	II
29 North Bar Without; 53.84563°N 0.43784°W		c. 1730	The house is stuccoed, and has a sill band, a cornice, a parapet, and a hipped slate roof. There are three storeys and cellars and five bays. In the centre is a Tuscan porch with two columns, and a doorway with columns below a transom, an entablature, and a wide arched fanlight. The windows are sashes, and on the side is a modillion cornice.	II*
48 North Bar Without; 53.84616°N 0.43759°W		c. 1730	The house is in red brick with a tile roof. There are three storeys and four bays. The doorway has Doric pilasters, an entablature with triglyphs, an ornamental fanlight and a dentilled pediment. The windows are sashes, and there are three gabled dormers.	II*
62 North Bar Without; 53.84681°N 0.43818°W		c. 1732	The house is in red brick, with a cornice and a Westmorland slate roof. There are two storeys and five bays, the middle bay projecting slightly, and later additions to the sides and rear. The central doorway has a round-arched head, a fanlight and a keystone. The windows are sashes with painted gauged voussoirs and keystones. On the roof are two pedimented dormers with horizontally sliding sashes, and at the rear are wrought iron railings.	II*
35 North Bar Within; 53.84409°N 0.43472°W		c. 1740	The shop, designed by William Wrightson, is in red brick with a floor band, an ogee bracketed eaves cornice, and a steep slate roof. There are two storeys and attics, and five bays. In the centre is a doorway with a traceried fanlight and consoles. To its left is a shopfront with an entablature, carved pilasters with paterae, and a dentilled cornice, and to the right are two windows. The upper floor contains sash windows, and above are three dormers with pediments, the middle one segmental and the outer ones triangular.	II*
41–47 North Bar Within and 2 Vicar Lane; 53.84428°N 0.43514°W		c. 1740	Originally the Tiger Inn, it was later altered and converted into a row of shops. It is in painted brick with a steep Welsh slate roof. There are two storeys and attics, and eleven bays. The ground floor contains shopfronts of varying dates and styles, and recessed doorway with a gauged flat arch and a keystone. On the upper floor are sash windows, and above are five gabled roof dormers with finials.	II
7 and 9 North Bar Within; 53.84346°N 0.43364°W		18th century	The shop has an earlier timber framed core, and is in painted brick with a tile roof. There are two storeys and attics, and five bays. The ground floor contains a 19th-century shopfront, and to the left is a doorway with pilasters and a decorated lintel. The upper floor contains sash windows, and on the roof are two square-headed dormers with moulded cornices.	II
10 and 12 North Bar Within; 53.84369°N 0.43354°W		18th century	The shop has a timber framed core, it is encased in brick, and has eaves with coupled brackets and a pantile roof. There are two storeys and attics, and two bays. The ground floor contains shop windows with slender columns and a moulded cornice. The upper floor has sash windows, and there are two gabled dormers.	II
17 North Bar Within; 53.84365°N 0.43389°W		18th century	A shop on a corner site in painted brick, with a rounded corner on the right, and a pantile roof with tumbled brickwork in the right gable. There are two storeys and an attic, and a front of one bay. The ground floor contains a modern shopfront, above it is a large bow window, and there are three windows on the upper floor on the right return.	II
19 North Bar Within; 53.84369°N 0.43397°W		Mid-18th century	The shop is in brick, the front painted, with a moulded eaves cornice, and a pantile roof with stone moulded ogee kneelers. There are two storeys and attics, and two bays. On the ground floor is an early 19th-century shopfront with pilasters, an entablature, and a panelled base. The upper floor contains sash windows, and above is a dormer with a moulded pediment and a horizontally sliding sash window.	II*
38 North Bar Within; 53.84500°N 0.43569°W		18th century	The building is in painted brick, with a brick eaves band and a tile roof. There are two storeys and two bays. On the ground floor is a bowed shopfront with reeded pilasters, an entablature, architraves, and a shaped bracketed cornice. The upper floor contains sash windows.	II
13–19 North Bar Without; 53.84544°N 0.43714°W		18th century	A terrace of four houses in brick, most are stuccoed, lined and painted, with a steep pantile roof. There are two storeys and four bays. The doorways have pilasters, rectangular fanlights and hoods, and the windows are sash windows with voussoirs, some rendered.	II
14–18 North Bar Without; 53.84548°N 0.43658°W		18th century	A terrace of three houses in painted brick, with a moulded dentiled eaves cornice and a pantile roof. There are two storeys and attics, and three bays. The doorways have pilasters, rectangular fanlights and cornices. The windows are sash window, and on the roof are three gabled dormers with sliding casements.	II
20 North Bar Without; 53.84553°N 0.43667°W		18th century	The house, which was altered in the 19th century, is stuccoed, on a plinth, and has a cornice over the ground floor, an ornamental eaves cornice, and a steep slate roof. There are two storeys and attics, and two bays. The main doorway has a round arch, a radial bar fanlight and a keystone, and to the right is a round-arched passage doorway with a semicircular fanlight. To the left, and on the upper floor, are shallow splay bay windows, and on the roof are two pedimented dormers with sash windows.	II
22 North Bar Without; 53.84559°N 0.43679°W		18th century (probable)	The shop is in painted stucco, and has a bracketed eaves band and a pantile roof. There are two storeys and attics, and five bays. On the ground floor is a shopfront with an entablature and decorative consoles, two doorways with ornamental rectangular fanlights, and to the right is a passage entry with narrow pilasters. The upper floor contains sash windows with shouldered surrounds and cornices.	II
24 and 26 North Bar Without and east wing 53.84565°N 0.43688°W		18th century (probable)	The building is in lined and painted stucco, and has a tile roof. There are two storeys and attics, and two bays. On the ground floor is a shopfront with pilasters and a continuous fascia, the windows are sashes in moulded surrounds, and there are two gabled dormers. At the rear is a block in painted brick with two storeys and two bays. It has a slate roof with widely spaced eaves brackets, and contains sash windows. On the front, to the left, is a coach entrance with a cambered rendered head.	II
Wall and gate piers, 62 North Bar Without; 53.84671°N 0.43840°W		18th century	At the entrance to the forecourt are two brick piers with moulded stone caps and wrought iron lamp holders. Flanking them are low brick walls with stone coping and railings. The wrought iron gates are elaborate, and above them is an overthrow with a monogram.	II
Aragon House; 53.84536°N 0.43701°W		18th century (probable)	The house is in painted red brick, with a console eaves cornice and a slate roof. There are three storeys and three bays. In the centre is a doorway with pilasters, a rectangular fanlight and a cornice, and to its left is an arched carriageway with rusticated voussoirs and a keystone. Above the doorway is a square bay window, and the other windows are sashes, those on the lower two floors with moulded surrounds and cornices on consoles.	II
Osborne House; 53.84579°N 0.43772°W		18th century	The house, which was refronted in the early 19th century, is in lined and painted stucco, on a plinth, with a bracketed eaves cornice, and a slate mansard roof with half-gabled coped ends. There are two storeys and attics, and three bays. The central doorway has pilasters, an entablature, a rectangular fanlight and a cornice. The outer bays contain two-storey canted bay windows, the upper ones narrower. Above the doorway is a sash window with a moulded architrave and a cornice, and on the roof are two square-headed dormers.	II
St John's Presbytery; 53.84522°N 0.43679°W		18th century (probable)	The presbytery is in painted brick, the ground floor rendered, with a sill band and a slate roof. There are three storeys and two bays. The doorway in the left bay has attached columns, an entablature, a rectangular fanlight and a cornice. The windows are sashes.	II
Wall, gate and gate piers, St Mary's Church; 53.84412°N 0.43431°W		18th century (probable)	The walls enclosing the churchyard are in brick with stone coping, and are about 5 feet (1.5 m) in height. At the entrance to the churchyard are stone gate piers. The wrought iron gates and overthrow date from 1889.	II
The Red House; 53.84640°N 0.43772°W		1765	The house is in red brick, with a stone coped parapet, and a pantile roof with twin gable ends. There are three storeys and five bays, the middle three bays projecting slightly. In the centre is a doorway with applied Doric columns, a decorated frieze, and a pediment. This is flanked by later three-sided bay windows, and the upper floors contain sash windows. Attached is a two-storey two-bay wing.	II*
39 North Bar Without; 53.84603°N 0.43805°W		1769	The house is in brick, with a wood boxed gutter on widely spaced moulded stone modillions, and a pantile roof. There are three storeys and five bays. The central doorway has a moulded architrave, a Gothic fanlight, a frieze with a central tablet with an urn, consoles and a pediment. This is flanked by splayed wrought iron bay windows, and the upper floors contain windows with rendered lintels.	II
41 North Bar Without; 53.84610°N 0.43816°W		c. 1771	The house is in brick, with a wood ogee bracketed eaves cornice, and a tile roof with tumbled brickwork on the gable end. There are two storeys and four bays. Steps with wrought iron rails lead up to the doorway that has a decorative surround and a rectangular fanlight, and the windows are sashes.	II
4 North Bar Without; 53.84514°N 0.43597°W		Late 18th century	The building is timber framed on the front, with the gable end facing the road, and it has three storeys, each storey jettied. The ground floor has a shopfront with a three-light window, a doorway to the left, and carvings. The middle floor contains a seven-light bay window above a range of carved heraldic shields. On the top floor are two three-light windows flanking a carved figure in a niche. The gable is flanked by carved figures, and surmounted by a wrought iron weathervane.	II
6 and 8 North Bar Without; 53.84521°N 0.43607°W		Late 18th century	The public house on a corner site is in brick on the ground floor with stone rustication, it has applied timber framing above, a modillion and coloured coved eaves cornice, and a tile roof. There are two storeys, the upper storey jettied, and attics, and on the corner is a two-storey polygonal tourelle with a candle snuffer roof. On the ground floor are two doorways over which are carved panels, and mullioned and transomed windows. The upper floor contains small windows and an oriel window, and above are gabled dormers with pierced bargeboards.	II
46 North Bar Without; 53.84609°N 0.43749°W		Late 18th century (probable)	The house is in red brick with a pantile roof. There are three storeys and two bays. The doorway in the right bay has pilasters, an entablature, a rectangular fanlight, and a cornice. On the left bay of the middle floor is a square bay window, and the other windows are sashes with painted stucco flat arches.	II
Gate piers, The Old Hall; 53.84365°N 0.43618°W		Late 18th century	Flanking the entrance to the forecourt of the house are two gate piers in brick.	II
2 North Bar Within; 53.84347°N 0.43328°W		c. 1780	The shop is in red brick, with a moulded eaves cornice and a tile roof. There are three storeys and a basement, and four bays. On the ground floor is a 19th-century shopfront, with an 18th-century doorway approached by steps with wrought iron rails. To the left is a doorway with a plain surround, and the windows are sashes with flat gauged brick arches.	II
55–63 North Bar Within; 53.84471°N 0.43586°W		c. 1780	A terrace of five houses in red brick with a dentiled eaves cornice and a slate roof. There are three storeys and attics, and 14 bays. Stone steps with wrought iron rails lead up to the doorways, that each has an architrave, a fanlight with Gothic-style tracery, a fluted frieze with a central tablet containing an urn, and a pediment on consoles. The left house has a canted bay window, and the other windows are sashes with painted gauged flat arches. On the roof are five dormers and skylights.	II
33–37 North Bar Without; 53.84592°N 0.43792°W		c. 1790	A terrace of three houses in painted brick, with a sill band, a wood gutter on wrought iron brackets, and a pantile roof with coped gables. There are two storeys and six bays. Each house has a doorway in the left bay, with a rectangular fanlight and a dentilled cornice. The windows are sashes, and at the rear, each house has a two-storey bow window.	II
40 North Bar Within; 53.84504°N 0.43580°W		1793–94	The house, attached to the North Bar, is in red brick, with a sill band, a stone cornice, a parapet and a tile roof. There are three storeys and five bays, the right bay projecting. The doorway has slender Doric columns, an entablature, a radial fanlight, a shaped bracketed cornice, and a pediment, and the windows are sashes.	II
Beverley Arms Hotel; 53.84383°N 0.43427°W		1794–96	The hotel, which was extended in 1966–67, is in red brick with stone dressings, a sill band, a cornice under a coped parapet, and a pantile roof. There are three storeys and ten bays. The porch is in stone, and has two columns with fluted capitals, and an arched doorway with an ornamental radial fanlight and a fluted transom, and above it is an iron balcony. On the ground floor to the left are a round-arched doorway with a fanlight, a carriage entrance with a keystone, and a round-arched passage entry. The window above the porch has a round-arched head and an architrave, and the other windows are sashes.	II
2 North Bar Without; 53.84509°N 0.43590°W		c. 1795	The house, attached to the North Bar, is in red brick, with a sill band, a moulded blocking course and a parapet. Thee are three storeys and an attic, and four bays. The doorway in the left bay has attached Doric columns, an entablature, a rectangular fanlight, and a modillion pediment. The windows in the right bay are blind, and the others are sashes with flat gauged brick arches.	II
Sessions House; 53.84780°N 0.44130°W		1805–10	A court house in grey brick, with stone dressings and a Westmorland slate roof, in Classical style. The central block has two storeys and three bays. On the front is a stone tetrastyle Greek Ionic portico, over which is a pediment with a coat of arms in the tympanum, and surmounted by a statue in Coade stone. The doorway has an architrave, a frieze, a cornice and consoles. It is flanked by sash windows with architraves and cornices, and the windows on the upper floor have round-arched heads. The central block is flanked by single-storey wings.	II*
Lamp standard, 45 North Bar Without; 53.84629°N 0.43820°W	—	1824–26	The lamp standard is in cast iron, and has a square stepped base with a wreathed shield with lion mask on each face. On this is an octagonal step, and a column, fluted in the lower part, the upper part tapering, surmounted by a copper lantern.	II
Lamp standard, 53 North Bar Without; 53.84668°N 0.43876°W		1824–26	The lamp standard is in cast iron, and has a square stepped base with a wreathed shield with lion mask on each face. On this is an octagonal step, and a column, fluted in the lower part, the upper part tapering, surmounted by a copper lantern.	II
15 and 17 New Walk; 53.84739°N 0.43988°W		Early 19th century	The house, on a corner site, is stuccoed, and has a sill band, a bracketed eaves cornice, and a slate roof. There are three storeys, four bays on the front, and three on the left return. On the front are two doorways with fluted Roman Ionic columns, rectangular fanlights and a cornice. Between the doorways is a canted bay window, and the other windows are casements with moulded surrounds.	II
Wall, 5–13 Norfolk Street; 53.84762°N 0.44242°W		Early 19th century	The low wall running along the road to the north of the gardens is in yellow brick with rounded stone coping. It contains gate piers with pyramidal caps.	II
1 North Bar Within; 53.84330°N 0.43350°W		Early 19th century	The shop is in brick with sill bands and a slate roof with coupled shaped brackets. There are three storeys and one bay. The ground floor has the original shopfront, with moulded pilasters and consoles, and an entablature with a cornice. Above, the windows are sashes with stucco flat arches.	II
3 North Bar Within; 53.84334°N 0.43351°W		Early 19th century	The shop is in brick with sill bands and a slate roof with coupled shaped brackets. There are three storeys and two bays. On the ground floor is a modern shopfront, and the upper floors contain sashes with stucco flat arches.	II
5 North Bar Within; 53.84340°N 0.43354°W	—	Early 19th century	A house and shop in red brick with stone dressings, sill bands, a dentilled cornice, bracketed eaves, and a pantile roof with stone coped gables. There are three storeys and two bays. The ground floor contains a late 19th-century shopfront with a recessed entrance and a dentilled cornice, and to the left is a doorway with a moulded architrave and a blind fanlight. On the middle floor are bay windows with pilasters and dentilled cornices, and the top floor has sash windows with cambered heads.	II
29 and 31 North Bar Within; 53.84396°N 0.43454°W		Early 19th century (probable)	The two buildings are in painted brick, with widely spaced eaves brackets and pantile roofs. There are three storeys and two bays, the right bay taller. The ground floor has modern shopfronts with a continuous entablature. On the middle floor, the left bay has a canted bay window, and the right bay has a bow window. The top floor contains sash windows.	II
7 and 9 North Bar Without; 53.84529°N 0.43687°W		Early 19th century	A pair of houses in painted stucco, with a console eaves cornice and a slate roof. There are three storeys and four bays. The ground floor is rusticated and has an entablature. In the centre are paired doorways with Greek antae and rectangular fanlights. The windows are sashes with moulded surrounds, those on the middle floor with pulvinated friezes and cornices.	II
28 North Bar Without; 53.84571°N 0.43699°W		Early 19th century (probable)	The house is in limewashed brick, with widely spaced eaves brackets and a slate roof. There are two storeys and four bays. The doorway has a moulded surround and a rectangular fanlight, and the windows are sashes.	II
30 and 32 North Bar Without; 53.84580°N 0.43713°W		Early 19th century	The house is in brown brick with a slate roof. There are three storeys and three bays. There are two doorways with plain surrounds and rectangular fanlights, and between them is a round-arched passage entry with a semicircular fanlight, voussoirs and a keystone. The windows are sashes with stucco flat arches marked as voussoirs.	II
40 and 42 North Bar Without; 53.84598°N 0.43738°W		Early 19th century	A pair of houses in painted brick on a rendered plinth, with widely spaced eaves brackets, and a slate roof. There are three storeys and three bays. The doorways are paired in the centre, and have moulded surrounds and rectangular fanlights, and the windows are sashes.	II
44 North Bar Without; 53.84605°N 0.43744°W		Early 19th century (probable)	The house is in red brick with a slate mansard roof. There are two storeys and attics and two bays. The doorway in the right bay has a semicircular fanlight and a cornice on brackets. To its left is a two-light window, and to the right is a doorway with a rectangular fanlight, a flat brick gauged arch and a keystone. The left bay of the upper floor contains a square bay window, and to the right is a sash window. On the roof are two gabled dormers with carved bargeboards.	II
47 and 49 North Bar Without; 53.84639°N 0.43863°W		Early 19th century	A pair of houses in white brick, the left with a slate roof, and the right with a pantile roof. There are two storeys and attics, and four bays. The doorways, in the left bays, have decorative surrounds and lozenzed fanlights, and on the extreme left is a round-arched passage entry. The windows are sashes, and there are three gabled dormers.	II
50 North Bar Without; 53.84624°N 0.43765°W		Early 19th century	The house is in red brick with a slate roof. There are three storeys and two bays. On the right of the ground floor is a pair of carriage doors, and to the left is a doorway with reeded pilasters and a rectangular fanlight. The windows are sashes.	II
51 North Bar Without; 53.84651°N 0.43879°W		Early 19th century (probable)	The house is in white brick with a slate roof. There are two storeys and attics, and two bays. In the left bay is a doorway with attached Greek Ionic columns, an entablature, an ornamental rectangular fanlight and a cornice. The right bay contains a two-storey canted bay window, to the left are sash windows with stuccoed flat heads, and on the roof is a gabled dormer.	II
Stable block, 56 North Bar Without; 53.84652°N 0.43804°W		Early 19th century	The stable block is in red brick, and has a pantile roof with the stone coped gable end facing the road. On the gable end are two garage doors and a round-arched window above. Along the side are seven round-arched recesses containing doors, sash windows and garage doors.	II
64 and 66 North Bar Without; 53.84699°N 0.43837°W		Early 19th century	A pair of houses in white brick, with a slate roof and coped gables. There are two storeys and attics, and four bays. The outer bays contain doorways with fluted Ionic pilasters and divided fanlights. On the inner bays are canted bay windows, on the upper floor are sash windows, and there are two gabled dormers.	II
Front wall and railings, Memorial Garden; 53.84458°N 0.43552°W		Early 19th century	The entrance to the garden is flanked by iron piers with iron gates. Outside them are brick walls with stone coping and ornamental iron railings with intermediate and end piers.	II
Wall and piers, St Mary's Manor; 53.84462°N 0.43511°W		Early 19th century	At the entrance to the forecourt are brick piers with stone capping. These are flanked by brick walls with stone coping.	II
Westfield; 53.84731°N 0.44202°W		Early 19th century	A gaol complex converted into dwellings in 1880, consisting of three buildings in yellow brick. The outer buildings have two storeys and four bays, and contain sash windows with painted stucco lintels. The middle building has three storeys with canted corners and a hipped Welsh slate roof. In the centre is a two-storey rectangular bay window, and the porch is on the side.	II
Lamp standard at the junction with Bainton Close; 53.84826°N 0.44074°W	—	After 1826	The lamp standard is in cast iron, and has a square stepped base with a wreath on each face. On this is an octagonal step, and a column, fluted in the lower part, the upper part tapering, surmounted by a copper lantern.	II
Lamp standard, 1 New Walk; 53.84689°N 0.43905°W	—	After 1826	The lamp standard is in cast iron, and has a square stepped base with a wreath on each face. On this is an octagonal step, and a column, fluted in the lower part, the upper part tapering, surmounted by a copper lantern.	II
Lamp standard, 8 New Walk; 53.84729°N 0.43916°W	—	After 1826	The lamp standard is in cast iron, and has a square stepped base with a wreath on each face. On this is an octagonal step, and a column, fluted in the lower part, the upper part tapering, surmounted by a copper lantern.	II
Lamp standard, 9 New Walk; 53.84715°N 0.43942°W		After 1826	The lamp standard is in cast iron, and has a square stepped base. On this is an octagonal step, and a column, fluted in the lower part, the upper part tapering, surmounted by a copper lantern.	II
Lamp standard, 15 New Walk; 53.84740°N 0.43972°W		After 1826	The lamp standard is in cast iron, and has a square stepped base with a wreath on each face. On this is an octagonal step, and a column, fluted in the lower part, the upper part tapering, surmounted by a copper lantern.	II
Lamp standard, 16 and 18 New Walk; 53.84772°N 0.43978°W	—	After 1826	The lamp standard is in cast iron, and has a square stepped base with a wreath on each face. On this is an octagonal step, and a column, fluted in the lower part, the upper part tapering, surmounted by a copper lantern.	II
Lamp standard, 41 North Bar Without; 53.84627°N 0.43820°W	—	After 1826	The lamp standard is in cast iron, and has a square stepped base with a wreath on each face. On this is an octagonal step, and a column, fluted in the lower part, the upper part tapering, surmounted by a copper lantern.	II
Lamp standard, 56 North Bar Without; 53.84640°N 0.43813°W	—	After 1826	The lamp standard is in cast iron, and has a square stepped base with a wreath on each face. On this is an octagonal step, and a column, fluted in the lower part, the upper part tapering, surmounted by a copper lantern.	II
Lamp standard, 62 and 64 North Bar Without; 53.84680°N 0.43843°W	—	After 1826	The lamp standard is in cast iron, and has a square stepped base with a wreath on each face. On this is an octagonal step, and a column, fluted in the lower part, the upper part tapering, surmounted by a copper lantern.	II
Lamp standard, 44 Wood Lane; 53.84274°N 0.43582°W		After 1826	The lamp standard is in cast iron, and has a square stepped base with a wreath on each face. On this is an octagonal step, and a column, fluted in the lower part, the upper part tapering, surmounted by a copper lantern.	II
Lamp standard south of St Mary's Church; 53.84412°N 0.43334°W	—	After 1826	The lamp standard is in cast iron, and has a square stepped base with a wreath on each face. On this is an octagonal step, and a column, fluted in the lower part, the upper part tapering, surmounted by a copper lantern.	II
Lamp standard at the junction with Pasture Terrace; 53.84424°N 0.43740°W		c. 1830	The lamp standard is in cast iron, and has a low square base and a fluted column in two stages with moulded cills. It is surmounted by a copper lantern.	II
Garden wall, Pasture Terrace; 53.84444°N 0.43758°W		Early 19th century	The garden wall on the west side of Pasture Terrace is in red brick with a brick oversailing course at the top. It contains a blind arcade of 18 four-centred arches.	II
55 and 57 North Bar Without; 53.84671°N 0.43904°W		Early to mid-19th century	The house is in red brick with a slate roof. There are three storeys and four bays. The porch has pilasters and a dentilled cornice, and the doorway has a three-light fanlight. Immediately to its right is a small mullioned and transomed window, and these are flanked by two-storey canted bay windows with carved mullions. The other windows are sashes with moulded surrounds.	II
38 North Bar Without; 53.84593°N 0.43730°W		Mid-19th century	The house is in painted red brick, with a bracketed eaves cornice and a slate roof. There are two storeys and an attic, and two bays. In the right bay is a carriage entry, and the windows are sashes, all the openings with segmental heads. On the roof is a gabled dormer with decorative bargeboards and a finial.	II
53 North Bar Without; 53.84662°N 0.43891°W		Mid-19th century	The house is in brick, rendered on the front, with rusticated quoins, a dentilled eaves cornice, and a slate roof with stone coped gables. There are two storeys and three bays. The central doorway has a grooved surround, an ornamental rectangular fanlight, a decorated frieze, and a dentilled cornice, and the windows are sashes.	II
25 Wood Lane; 53.84307°N 0.43493°W		Mid-19th century	A shop, later a house, in brick with a pantile roof. There are two storeys and one bay. On the ground floor is a shopfront with a bow window, a wood fascia and pilasters, a shutter in a case to the left, and a doorway with a three-light rectangular fanlight to the right. The upper floor contains a sash window with a rendered lintel.	II
Pillar box, 12 New Walk; 53.84745°N 0.43923°W		19th century	The pillar box by the garden gate is cylindrical, and has a fluted frieze and a segmental-headed top. It is inscribed "VR" and with the maker's name.	II
Water pump 53.84423°N 0.43446°W		Mid-19th century	The water pump is in iron, and is in Gothic style. It has an octagonal plan with a finial, and the handle is missing.	II
37 and 39 North Bar Within; 53.84409°N 0.43492°W		1861	The building, designed by Cuthbert Brodrick, is in red brick on a stone plinth, with stone dressings, decorative sill bands, stone brackets at the eaves, and a hipped slate roof. There are three storeys and five bays. The openings are in recesses; on the ground floor they are round-headed, the right recess containing a doorway with a semicircular fanlight, and others have windows with panelled aprons. The middle floor recesses are round-headed and contain flat-headed windows with decoration above. On both floors are pilasters with carved capitals. The top floor recesses and windows have segmental heads.	II
1-6 Willow Grove; 53.84387°N 0.43797°W	—	c. 1865	A terrace of six houses in yellowish brick with two storeys. Each house has three bays and a hipped Welsh slate roof. The doorways have plain pilasters, entablatures, rectangular fanlights and cornices, and the windows are sashes with slightly segmental heads; some are blocked. The first house has a projecting wing.	II
Former Barclays Bank; 53.84365°N 0.43355°W		Mid to late 19th century	The former bank is red brick on a plinth, with dressings in painted stone and stucco, sill bands, a console cornice and a slate roof. There are thee storeys and six bays. The doorway in the right bay has a segmental-headed fanlight, and the ground floor windows have segmental heads. The upper floors contain sash windows with architraves, those on the middle floor also with cornices.	II
2–6 New Walk; 53.84723°N 0.43858°W		c. 1870	A terrace of three houses in yellow brick, with stone dressings, a sill band, a band below the eaves decorated with roundels and swags, a dentilled cornice, bracketed eaves, and a mansard roof in Welsh slate. There are two storeys, attics and basements, and nine bays. Steps with iron balustrades lead up to the doorways, each with pilasters, a semicircular fanlight, a dentilled cornice, and a pediment with a cartouche. On the ground floor are three canted bay windows. The upper floor windows have round-arched heads with keystones, and above are five gabled dormers.	II
Wall and gate piers, 2–6 New Walk; 53.84712°N 0.43885°W		c. 1870	The low wall enclosing the garden is in red brick with stone coping. It contains three sets of gate piers with stone caps.	II
8 and 10 New Walk; 53.84743°N 0.43886°W		c. 1870	A pair of houses in white brick, with rusticated stone quoins, a moulded cornice between the floors, a sill band, a dentilled and moulded eaves cornice, and a slate French mansard roof. There are two storeys and attics, and three bays. The doorways have round-arched heads with carved keystones. On the ground floor are three canted bay windows, and the upper floor windows have round stuccoed heads and cresting. On the roof are three gabled dormers and two oval dormers with crests.	II
15 North Bar Within; 53.84360°N 0.43383°W		c. 1870	The shop is in red brick, with a sill band, a panelled eaves band, and a slate Mansard roof. There are three storeys and attics, four bays and an older rear wing. On the ground floor is a shopfront with a dentilled entablature. Above, the windows are sashes in architraves, those on the middle floor with flat heads and cornices, and those on the top floor with segmental heads and keystones. On the roof are two round-arched dormers with casements.	II
Urinal, Sessions House; 53.84758°N 0.44041°W		Late 19th century	The urinal is in cast iron and has an oblong plan. It is decorated with panels containing star motifs and geometrical borders in two tiers, divided by a lower band of paterae and a middle band of a Greek key motif. At the top is a cornice and an openwork frieze.	II
20 New Walk; 53.84802°N 0.43977°W		1876	The house is in red brick with a mansard roof in Welsh slate. There are two storeys and attics, and three bays, the middle bay slightly recessed. The central doorway has a moulded arched surround, with an arched fanlight and a mask keystone. The outer bays contain two-storey rectangular bay windows, and above is a decorated cornice. On the roof are two gabled dormers with semicircular windows.	II
Oak House; 53.84614°N 0.43836°W		1880	The house is in red brick, with applied timber framing above the ground floor and a tile roof. There are two storeys and three bays. The left bay is wider and gabled, the upper floor and the gable are jettied. The ground floor contains a bay window, on the upper floor is a mullioned and transomed window, and the gable has a six-light mullioned window and bargeboards with carved oak foliage. The narrow middle bay has a doorway with a pentice roof and a window above. On the right bay is a two-storey six-sided bay window with a conical hood.	II
45 North Bar Without; 53.84630°N 0.43850°W		1894	The house has a ground floor in brick, the upper floor has applied timber framing, above which is a coved cornice decorated in stucco with flowers in a continuous scroll, and a pantile roof. There are two storeys and attics, and three bays. Above the central doorway is a carved panel, and it is flanked by windows under carved bands. On the upper floor are two rectangular oriel windows flanking a four-light window, and on the roof are three dormers, the outer ones gabled with finials.	II
St John of Beverley Church; 53.84519°N 0.43669°W		1897–98	The church, dedicated to St John of Beverley, is in red and brown brick, with stone dressings and banding, and a Welsh slate roof. It consists of a continuous nave and chancel with a canted east end, a south chapel, and a south bell tower. The doorway has a rusticated surround and a Tudor arched head, and is flanked by windows with cusped lights. Above the doorway is a statue in a niche. Over this are two three-light basket-arched windows under crocketed ogee gables, and above is the main gable containing a statue in a niche.	II
The Rose and Crown Public House; 53.84499°N 0.43670°W		c. 1900	The public house is on a corner site, it is in brick, rendered on the ground floor, and with applied timber framing above, and has a tile roof with gables and bargeboards. The front facing York Road has three storeys and three bays. The outer bays are gabled, and on the middle bay are two oriel windows. The front facing North Bar Without has two storeys and an attic and two gabled bays. On the left bay is a balcony, and there is a roof dormer.	II

== See also ==
- Listed buildings in Beverley (central and northeast areas)
- Listed buildings in Beverley (south area)
- Listed buildings in Beverley (west and southwest areas)
- Listed buildings in Beverley (southeast area)
