= Rose & Crown, Beverley =

Pub in Beverley, East Riding of Yorkshire, England

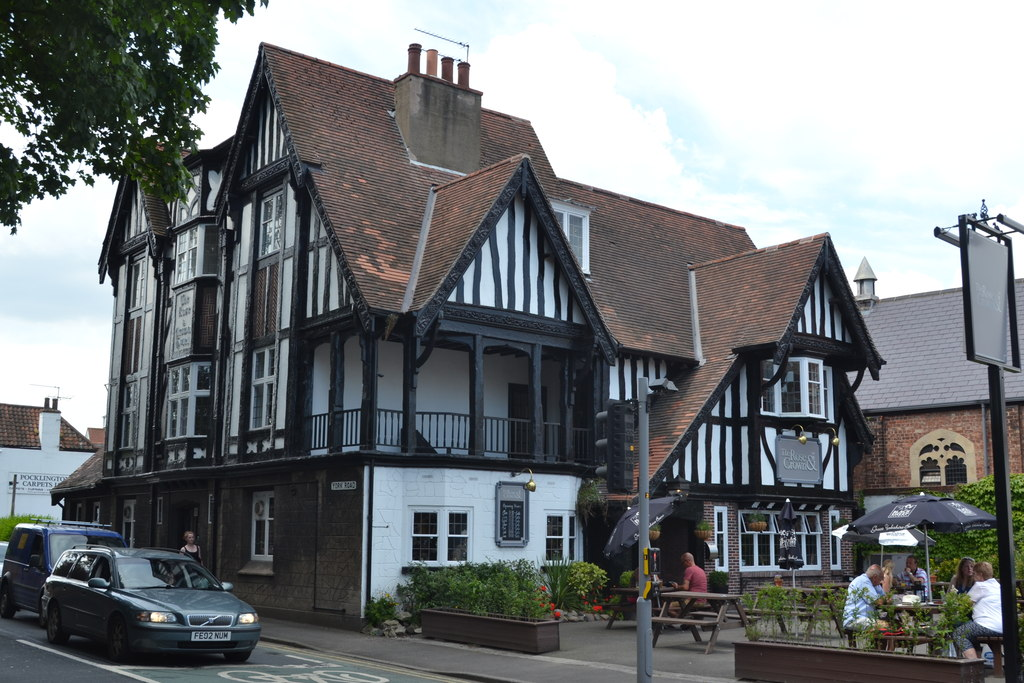
The pub, in 2014

The Rose & Crown is a historic pub in Beverley, a town in the East Riding of Yorkshire, in England.

The pub was built in about 1900. Nikolaus Pevsner was unimpressed with it design, describing it as a "typical example of a mundane mock half-timbered pub" The building was grade II listed in 1987. By 2018, it was owned by Enterprise Inns, when it landlord refurbished the kitchen at a cost of £60,000. The bar area was refurbished in 2026, the work including placing paintings of horses at nearby Beverley Racecourse on the walls.

The pub is on a corner site, it is in brick, rendered on the ground floor, and with applied timber framing above, and has a tile roof with gables and bargeboards. The front facing York Road has three storeys and three bays. The outer bays are gabled, and on the middle bay are two oriel windows. The front facing North Bar Without has two storeys and an attic and two gabled bays. On the left bay is a balcony, and there is a roof dormer.

== See also ==
- Listed buildings in Beverley (north area)
