= St Mary's Church, Beverley =

Coordinates: 53.8442°N 0.4340°W

The Parish Church of St Mary, Beverley
- The Parish Church of St Mary, Beverley
- OS grid reference: TA 03150 39805
- Country: England
- Denomination: Church of England
- Website: stmarysbeverley.org

History
- Dedication: St Mary

Architecture
- Functional status: Active
- Heritage designation: Grade I listed
- Designated: 1 March 1950
- Architectural type: Parish church
- Style: Gothic
- Completed: 1520

Specifications
- Length: 197 feet (60 m)

Administration
- Province: Province of York
- Diocese: Diocese of York

Clergy
- Vicar: The Revd Becky Lumley

St Mary's Church is an Anglican parish church in Beverley in the East Riding of Yorkshire, England. It is designated a Grade I listed building.

== History ==
St Mary's was established in the first half of the 12th century as a daughter church of Beverley Minster, to serve Beverley's trading community. It is a cruciform church, 197 feet in length, with aisled nave and chancel, south transept with east aisle, north transept with east chapel and crypt below, northeast chapel with adjoining sacristy and priests’ rooms above, and a crossing tower.

A few 12th and early 13th century fragments remain scattered throughout the church. These are numerous enough to determine that by the mid-13th century, the church consisted of an aisle-less chancel and transepts, an aisled nave, and probably a crossing tower.

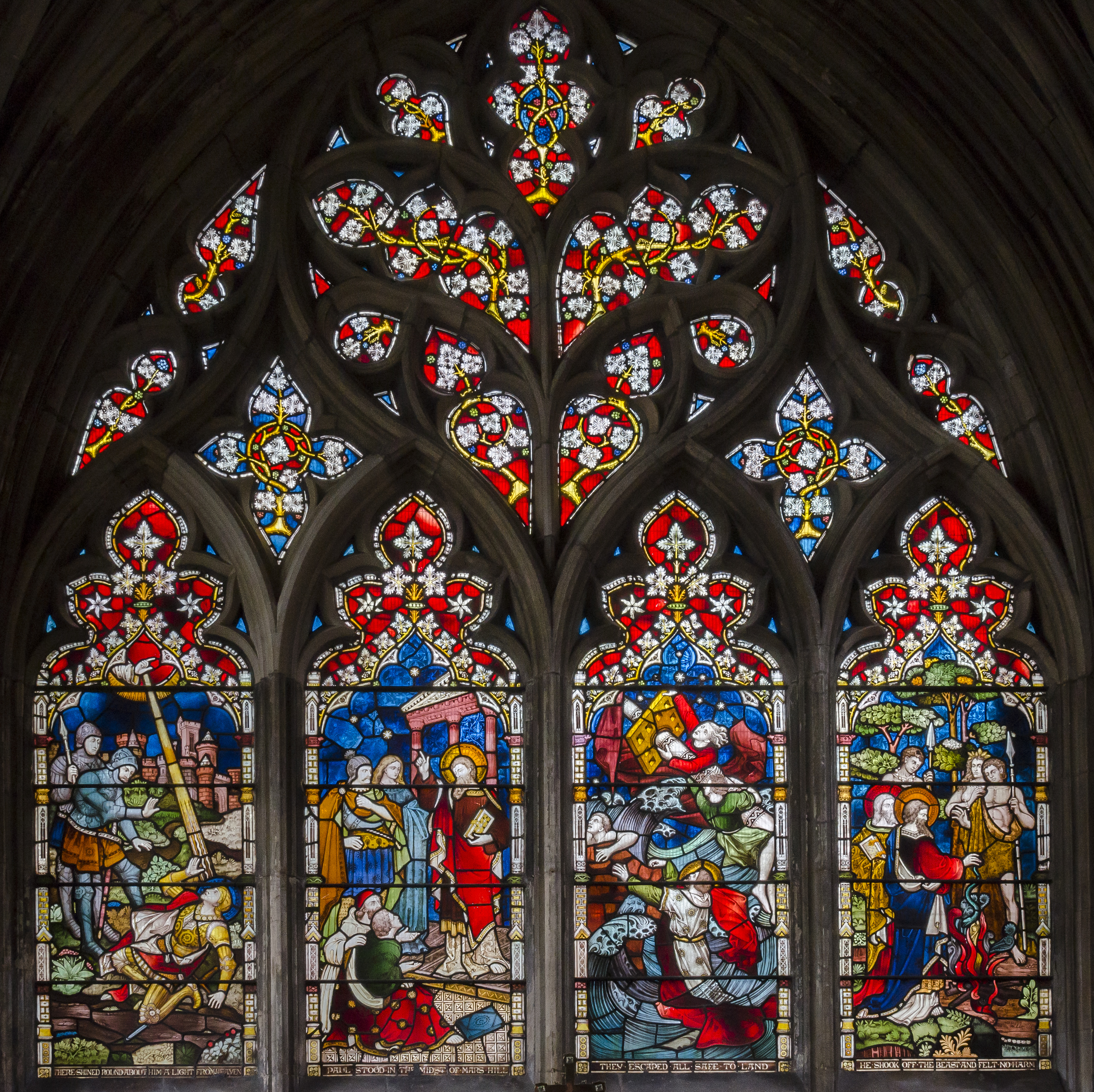
East window of northeast chapel, built in the 1330s or 1340s. The stained glass is from the 19th century, by Clayton and Bell.

Systematic rebuilding began in the late 13th century, during the Decorated period, when a large chapel was added on to the east side of the north transept. This was followed c. 1300 by the addition of a south aisle to the previously aisle-less chancel, in conjunction with a widening of east aisle of the south transept. The nave aisles were completely rebuilt in the early 14th century. In the 1330s or 1340s the chancel was given a north aisle, the three easternmost bays of which were made into a superb chapel with Flowing tracery and a tierceron-star vault. The mouldings of the tracery, windows, vault, and piers all merge fluidly with each other, unifying the space. The mouldings of the vault ribs on the north wall spring from the floor and form fluted columns without capitals, and on the south wall spring from the column capitals, intersecting and running through the arcade mouldings.

Ceiling of the chancel, depicting 40 kings of England

One of the misericords of the choir stalls

Building work at St Mary's ceased in the mid-14th century, as in so many cases throughout England, because of the Black Death. It did not resume until c. 1400, when the west front was rebuilt in the Perpendicular style and a Perpendicular clerestory was added to the nave. The south porch and a clerestory for the chancel followed in the early 15th century. The transepts were rebuilt with clerestories in the mid-15th century; the Early Gothic arches were reused, but set on new piers. Bequests for this work were made in 1451–3, and further bequests in 1498–1500 funded the rebuilding of the west end of the nave aisles. Also installed throughout the 15th and into the 16th centuries were the series of fine wooden ceilings for which the building is known. The most recognized is the chancel ceiling, originally of the mid-15th century but entirely repainted in 1863, with depictions of forty English kings from the mythical Brutus through Henry VI, and a portrait of George VI from 1939.

During Evensong on 29 April 1520, the central tower collapsed, ‘and overwhelmed some that then were in [the church]’. Much of the work on the eastern end of the nave was undone, though the aisle walls were little damaged. The central tower and the nave arcades and clerestory were entirely rebuilt, though the clerestory windows appear to be of c. 1400: Pevsner suggests that "[p]ossibly they were reused in spite of the radical damage done by the falling tower". This rebuilding work began immediately after the collapse, the south arcade bearing an inscribed date of 1524 at both east and west ends. William Rokeby, Archbishop of Dublin, a Yorkshire man, at his death the following year left £200 in his will for the rebuilding works. Those who gave money for the piers of the north arcade are commemorated in inscriptions on the hoodmould stops: merchant John Crossley and his wife; the good wives of Beverley; and the minstrels, five of whom are depicted as statues on corbels against their pier.

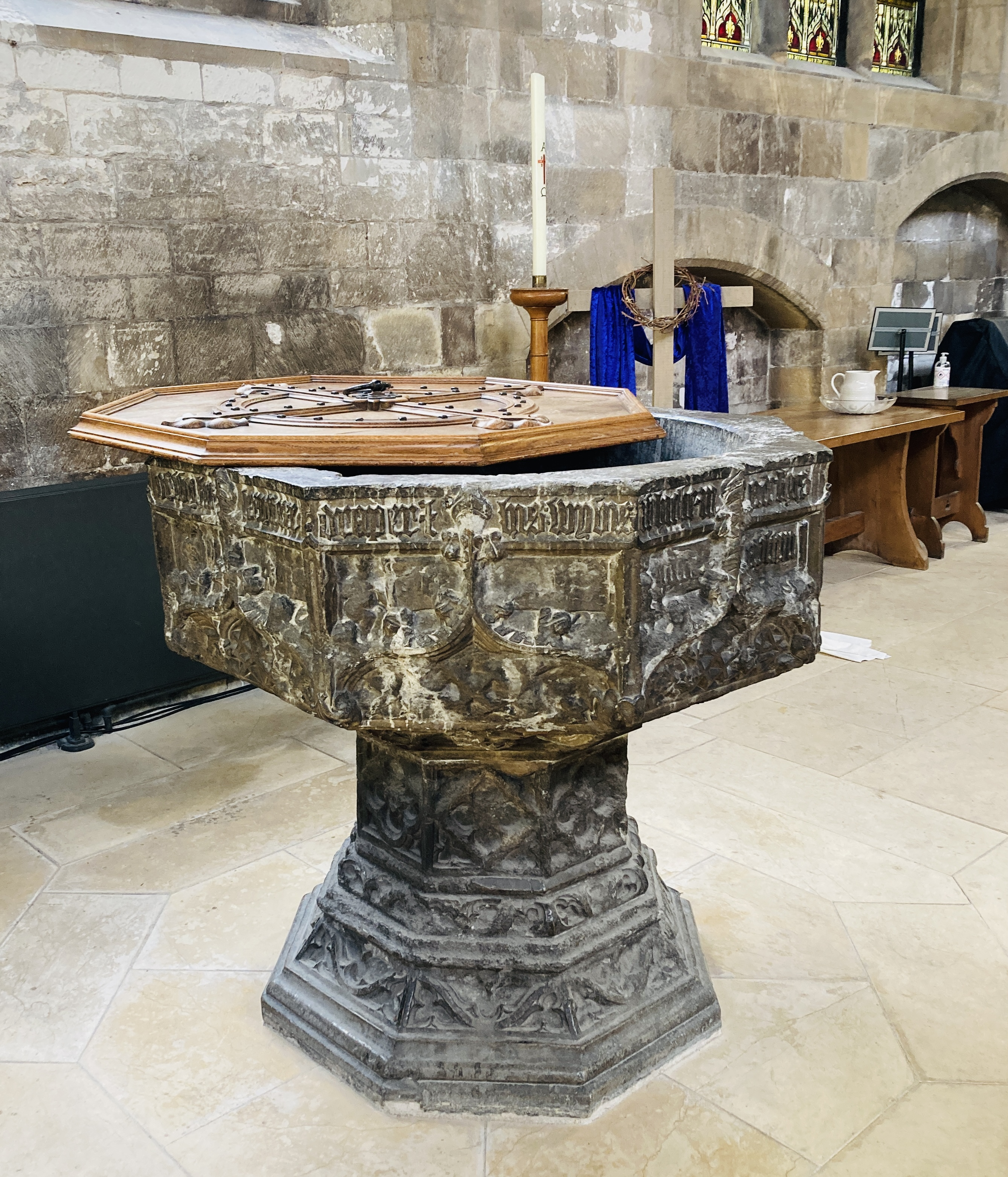
The font of 1530

The present font dates from 1530, the gift of a Beverley draper, William Leryffax. Made of Derbyshire marble, it is richly ornamented with a defaced inscription.

The 19th century saw significant restoration undertaken at St. Mary's, in 1829–30 under William Comins, then under A. W. N. Pugin in 1844–52. E. W. Pugin took over the work, and was followed by Cuthbert Brodrick, George Gilbert Scott (who refitted the nave and chancel), and numerous other architects.

In 2020, the restoration of the stonework started with the replacement of some weathered stone carvings with newly commissioned figures based on characters from The Chronicles of Narnia books by C. S. Lewis.

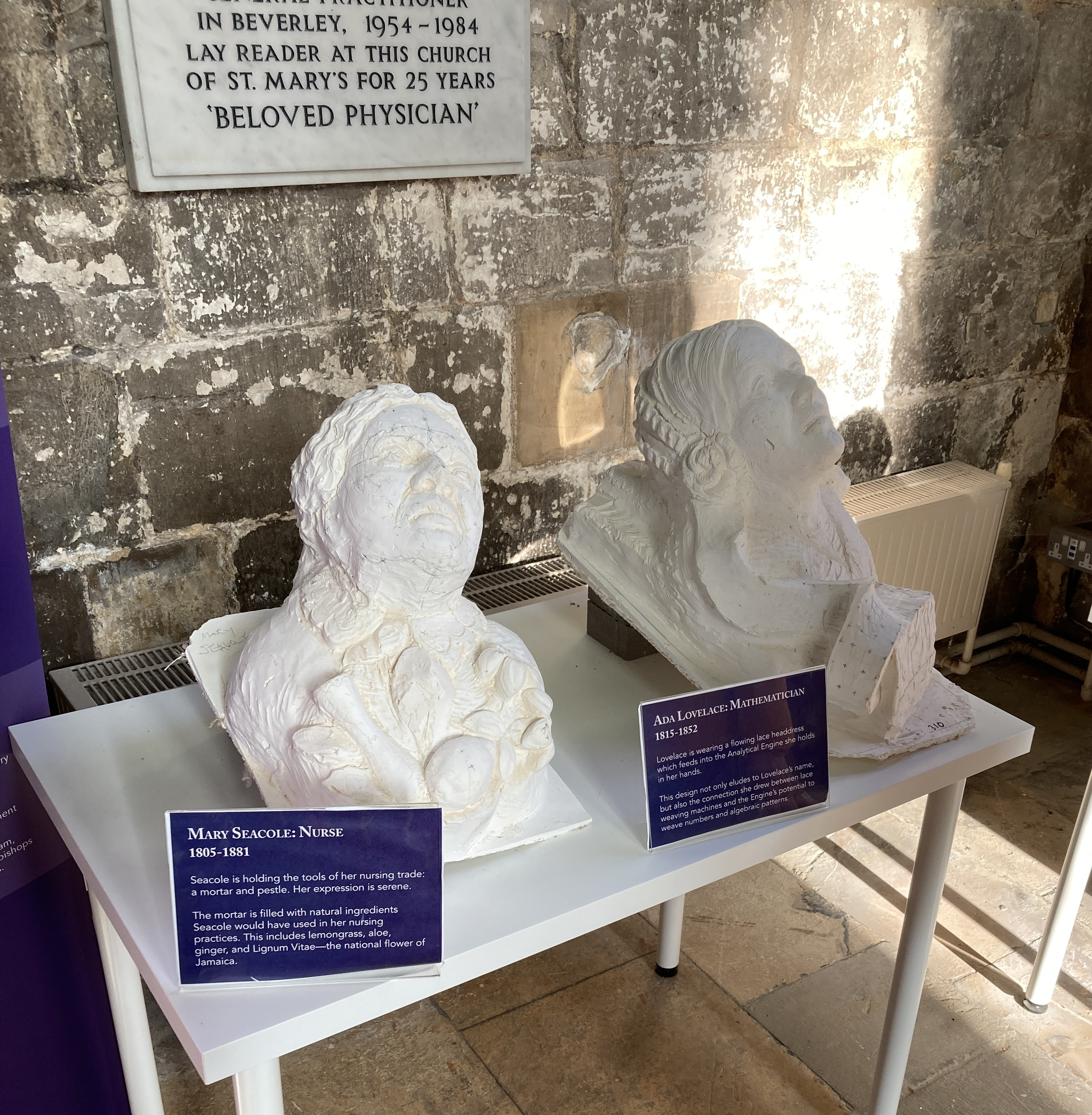
Designs for the carvings of Mary Seacole and Ada Lovelace

In 2021, as part of a programme celebrating women in the restoration of the stonework of the church, it was announced that stone figures of nine women will include Hull born pilot and engineer Amy Johnson, and Hilda Lyon the aeronautical engineer educated at Beverley High School will feature alongside Mary Wollstonecraft, Mary Seacole, Marie Curie, Rosalind Franklin, Helen Sharman and Ada Lovelace and Queen Elizabeth II.

== Clock ==
An early clock was installed in 1683. This was replaced at a cost of £265 (equivalent to £28,500 in 2025) by a new clock with three dials and bells was installed by Gillett of Croydon and set going on 14 February 1884.

== Organ ==
According to George Oliver (writing in 1829), an organ built by Donaldson of York was placed in the rood loft at the east end of the nave in 1792, at a cost raised by voluntary subscription of £311, the subscribers appointing Mr Lambert as organist. In 1869, Messrs Forster and Andrews built a new organ, said to 'boast a richly carved oak screen with handsomely decorated front pipes'. In 1889 the same firm installed a detached console beside the choir stalls and pneumatic action was added throughout. In 1908 it was completely rebuilt by Messrs Lewis & Co of London, when the oak case of the previous organ was discarded. In 1954 a major overhaul was carried out by local firm Messrs Hall & Broadfield which replaced the pneumatic action with an electro-magnetic mechanism and transformed the three-manual organ into a four-manual instrument. The completed rebuild was dedicated in 1957.

== See also ==
- Grade I listed churches in the East Riding of Yorkshire
- Listed buildings in Beverley (north area)
- The Old Hall, Beverley, former vicarage of St Mary's
