= Old Vicarage =

Old Vicarage may refer to:

- Old Vicarage, Beverley, East Riding of Yorkshire, England
- Old Vicarage, Church Fenton, North Yorkshire, England
- East Ruston Old Vicarage, Norfolk, England
- Old Vicarage, Grantchester, a building in Cambridgeshire, England
  - The Old Vicarage, Grantchester, a poem
- Old Vicarage, Helmsley, North Yorkshire, England
- The Old Vicarage, Derbyshire, restaurant near Sheffield, England
- Old Vicarage, Tadcaster, North Yorkshire, England
- The Old Vicarage, Wakefield, West Yorkshire, England
- Culham Court, Oxfordshire, a house in Culham, Oxfordshire, England

== See also ==
- The Vicarage (disambiguation)
