= Listed buildings in Beverley (south area) =

Beverley is a civil parish in the county of the East Riding of Yorkshire, England. It contains about 450 listed buildings that are recorded in the National Heritage List for England. Of these, eight are listed at Grade I, the highest of the three grades, 31 are at Grade II*, the middle grade, and the others are at Grade II, the lowest grade. The parish contains the market town of Beverley and the surrounding region. This list contains the listed buildings in the area described by Pevsner and Neave as the south area, and include Highgate, Minster Yard, Eastgate, Cross Street, Toll Gavel and the adjacent streets. The northern part of the area includes the civic centre and part of the commercial area, the part to the northeast, centred around Beverley Minster, is largely residential, and to the east is the railway station. Most of the listed buildings in the northern part are civic buildings and shops, and in all parts are houses. The others include a former friary and associated structures, public houses, lamp standards, a railway station and a signal box, a Masonic lodge, a parish hall and a former church.

== Key ==
Grade	Criteria
I	Buildings of exceptional interest, sometimes considered to be internationally important
II*	Particularly important buildings of more than special interest
II	Buildings of national importance and special interest

== Buildings ==
Name and location	Photograph	Date	Notes	Grade
Beverley Minster; 53.83915°N 0.42460°W		Early 13th century	The church has been altered and extended through the centuries. It is built mainly in magnesian limestone and has lead roofs. The church has a cruciform plan, consisting of a nave with a clerestory, north and south aisles, a north porch, north and south transepts, a lower tower at the crossing, and a chancel with north and south aisles and north and south transepts. At the west end are twin towers with buttresses containing statues in niches, embattled parapets and crocketed pinnacles. Between them is a west doorway, over which is a canopied niche and a nine-light window.	I
The Old Vicarage; 53.83974°N 0.42434°W		Medieval	The house was extended in 1703 and again in the early 19th century. It is in white brick and has two storeys and attics. The front facing Eastgate has a slate roof and three bays, and contains blank windows with stone arched heads and carved keystones. The doorway has reeded jambs with paterae, and a fanlight. The front facing Minster Yard has a pantile roof and four bays, and contains a Gothic-style bay window, a doorway and sash windows. To the left is a single-storey two-bay wing.	II
Precinct wall, The Old Friary; 53.83968°N 0.42332°W		Late medieval	The wall extends along the north side of Friars Lane, and is about 3 metres (9.8 ft) in height. It is in orange brick, it incorporates blocks of limestone, and is partly rendered.	II
The Guildhall; 53.84127°N 0.42996°W		15th century	The building, which has a timber framed core, was altered internally in 1762–64, and the front, including the portico, was added in 1832. The tetrastyle Greek Doric portico is in sandstone, with a triglyph frieze and triangular pediment. The upper parts of the columns are fluted, and the doorway has an architrave, a frieze, consoles and a cornice. The flanking windows have architraves and cornices, and above is a large projecting tablet. Inside, there is fine decoration including a painted ceiling in the court room.	I
The Old Friary; 53.84004°N 0.42304°W		15th century	The friary has been much altered, and later used for other purposes. It is in stone and brick, with quoins and a pantile roof. There are two storeys, and it consists of a long block with a projecting two-storey gabled porch near the centre and a projecting west wing. The doorway in the porch has a segmental head, and the windows are mullioned.	II*
Wall, gateway and gate piers, 52 Eastgate; 53.83989°N 0.42424°W	—	16th century	The wall enclosing the garden on Eastgate is mainly in red brick, with some stone, and is about 10 feet (3.0 m) in height and 70 feet (21 m) in length. It projects to contain a gateway with a moulded four-centred arch and jambs, surmounted by a triangular pediment. The later part of the wall, facing Minster Yard, is about 6 feet (1.8 m) in height, and contains two gate piers with ball finials.	II
Brick gateway, The Old Friary; 53.83981°N 0.42283°W		16th century	The gateway in the wall of the friary consists of a brick arch that has been blocked in brick.	II
The Sun Inn; 53.83930°N 0.42353°W		16th century	The ground floor of the public house is in colourwashed brick, the upper storey is jettied on plain corbels and is timber framed, and the roof is tiled, with tumbled brickwork on the gable end. There are two storeys and three bays. The ground floor contains a doorway with a rectangular fanlight, on the left is a shopfront converted into a window, and the other windows are sashes.	II
21 and 23 Highgate; 53.84030°N 0.42574°W		17th century (probable)	The house, which was refronted in about 1800, is in brick with a pantile roof. There are two storeys and three bays. The central doorway is modern, with side lights, and contains the original reset fanlight. The windows are sashes, and the ground floor openings have painted rendered voussoirs.	II
54 and 56 Toll Gavel; 53.84170°N 0.42875°W		Late 17th century	A pair of shops in lined and painted stucco, with rusticated quoins, moulded wooden eaves, and a tile roof. There are two storeys and attics, and three bays. On the ground floor are two shopfronts with pilasters and a continuous entablature, and to the left is a round-arched passage entry. The upper floor contains sash windows in moulded architraves. At the rear is a single-storey extension, beyond which is a two-storey block in brick with a pantile roof, containing horizontally sliding sash windows.	II*
67 and 69 Toll Gavel; 53.84183°N 0.42857°W		Late 17th century	A pair of shops on a corner site, that were refaced with stucco, lined and painted, in the late 18th century. They have a brick dentilled eaves band and a pantile roof. On the ground floor are two shopfronts with pilasters and entablatures, and the upper floor contains sash windows.	II
7 St John Street; 53.83894°N 0.42595°W		Before 1690	The house, which was refronted in the early to mid-18th century, is in red brick, with a dentilled eaves cornice, and a pantile roof. There are two storeys and attics, and four bays. The doorway has pilasters, an entablature and a rectangular fanlight. The windows are sashes, those on the ground floor with painted brick gauged heads, and there are two gabled dormers.	II
8–11 St John Street; 53.83879°N 0.42590°W		Before 1690	A medieval building that has been converted into four houses, it was refronted in the early 18th century, and is pebbledashed. It has stone rusticated quoins on the right, a string course, a moulded eaves cornice, and a pantile roof. There are two storeys and attics, and nine bays. The doorways have divided rectangular fanlights, the windows are sashes, some tripartite, and there are gabled dormers. Inside the houses is some surviving medieval work, and built into the eaves bracket at the south end is a sculpted medieval head.	II
30 Highgate; 53.84014°N 0.42587°W		c. 1700	The house is in lined and painted stucco, with a moulded eaves cornice, and a pantile roof with tumbled brickwork to the gable end. There are two storeys and attics, and three bays, the middle bay projecting slightly. The central round-arched doorway has a radial fanlight, imposts and a fluted keystone. The outer bays contain sash windows, those in the ground floor with shutters.	II
Foresters Hall; 53.84181°N 0.42873°W		c. 1703	The building, also known as Ann Routh's House, has been used for various purposes. It is in painted brick on a moulded plinth, with a wooden eaves cornice, and a pantile roof. There are two storeys and attics, and five bays. The central doorway has a rectangular fanlight, the windows are sashes, those on the ground floor with rendered lintels, and on the roof are two dormers with steep pediments. At the rear is a large Venetian window.	II*
1 Highgate; 53.84084°N 0.42621°W		Early 18th century	The house, on a corner site, is in painted brick on a projecting brick base, with an ogee-moulded bracket cornice, and a steep hipped pantile roof. There are two storeys and one bay. On the front is a doorway with a divided fanlight, and a sash window on each floor with rendered voussoirs. There is one window on the left return and a roof dormer.	II
15 Highgate; 53.84055°N 0.42590°W		Early 18th century	The house is in red brick, with a projecting base, a painted moulded eaves cornice, and a tile roof. There are two storeys, attics and a basement, and five bays. Steps flanked by wrought iron rails with scrapers lead up to the central doorway. This is in a recessed reveal and has a moulded architrave and a decorative rectangular fanlight. The windows are sashes, and the openings have gauged flat brick heads. There are two gabled dormers, and the basement has recessed panels.	II
17 Highgate; 53.84046°N 0.42586°W		Early 18th century	The house is in painted red brick with a projecting base, a painted moulded eaves cornice, and a tile roof. There are two storeys and attics, and three bays. Steps flanked by wrought iron rails with scrapers lead up to the central doorway, which has a moulded architrave and a decorative rectangular fanlight. The windows are sashes, the openings have gauged flat brick heads, and there are two gabled dormers.	II
38 Highgate; 53.83992°N 0.42590°W		Early 18th century	Originally the Bluecoat School, later used for other purposes, the building is in red brick, with a sill band, a modillion eaves cornice, and a pantile roof with tumbled brickwork on the gable end. There are two storeys and attics, and five bays, and a later lower bay on the left. The doorway has a three-light fanlight, the windows are sashes, and all the openings have flat gauged brick heads. On the roof are three pedimented dormers with horizontally sliding sashes.	II
9 and 11 Toll Gavel; 53.84212°N 0.43101°W		Early 18th century	A pair of shops in painted brick, with a moulded eaves cornice and a pantile roof. There are two storeys and attics, and two bays. On the ground floor are modern shopfronts, the upper floor contains two sash windows, and on the roof are two gabled dormers.	II
10 Toll Gavel; 53.84204°N 0.43133°W		Early 18th century	The shop is in painted brick with a pantile roof. There are two storeys and an attic, and one bay. On the ground floor is a modern shopfront, and above is a sash window.	II
12 Toll Gavel; 53.84200°N 0.43121°W		Early 18th century	The shop is in painted brick with a pantile roof. There are two storeys and an attic, and two bays. On the ground floor is a modern shopfront, the upper floor contains casement windows, and on the roof is a pedimented dormer with a sash window.	II
44 Toll Gavel; 53.84170°N 0.42966°W		Early 18th century	Two shops in painted brick, with an eaves cornice and a tile roof. There are three storeys and five bays. On the ground floor are two shopfronts, the left one that of a pharmacist dating from about 1830. It has two shop windows with panelled bases, surmounted by bands of vertical reeding. At each end is a semi-elliptical elongated Doric attached column on a pedestal. Flanking the central door are two engaged Doric columns on pedestals with metal serpents twining round them. Across the front is a lintel, and a decorated cornice with paterae. The upper floors contain sash windows.	II*
46 Toll Gavel; 53.84168°N 0.42953°W		Early 18th century	The shop, which was refronted in the mid-19th century, is rendered, with quoins, and a hipped pantile roof. There are two storeys and four bays, and the front is curved to fit a corner site. On the ground floor is a modern shopfront, and the upper floor contains sash windows, with entablatures and paterae, and cornices on brackets with leaf ornament.	II
Monks Walk Public House; 53.84036°N 0.42580°W		Early 18th century and earlier	The public house has a timber framed core, and is enclosed in red brick on a rendered plinth, with a moulded eaves cornice and a pantile roof. There are two storeys and five bays. The central doorway has fluted pilasters, and a cornice on consoles. The windows are sashes with flat gauged brick heads. Inside, there is exposed timber framing, a whitewashed brick wall divided into bays by Doric pilasters, and various pedimented openings.	II*
44 Eastgate and petrol pump 53.84000°N 0.42448°W		c. 1735	Originally a house, it was converted for commercial use in the 19th century, and into a garage in 1920. The building is in whitewashed brick with a pantile roof. There are two storeys and an L-shaped plan, with a front range of two bays and a long rear range. On the front is a large arch and to its left is a segmental-arched niche containing a petrol pump with a swinging arm. The upper floor contains two multi-paned windows.	II
1, 2 and 3 Cross Street; 53.84154°N 0.42904°W		18th century	A row of three shops in painted brick with a pantile roof, and shopfronts on the ground floor. The left shop has two storeys and one bay, and the middle shop is of the same height with three storeys and three bays. The right shop is lower, with two storeys and three bays, and to the right is a lower two-storey extension. On the upper floors are sash windows, some horizontally sliding.	II
6 Eastgate; 53.84096°N 0.42563°W		18th century	The building is rendered, and has a dentilled brick eaves cornice, a vase lead rainwater head, and a pantile roof with tumbled brickwork on the gable end. There are two storeys and two bays. On the right is a shopfront with panelled pilasters, moulded consoles, a reeded sill, and a bow window. To the extreme left is a doorway with pilasters, and an entablature, and the windows are sashes.	II
13 Eastgate; 53.84102°N 0.42534°W		18th century	The building, on a corner site, is in brick, stuccoed on the front, and has a pantile roof with gable coping and tumbled brickwork. There are two storeys and an attic, and two bays. On the ground floor is a recessed doorway flanked by shop windows, and the upper floor contains sash windows.	II
36 Eastgate; 53.84017°N 0.42464°W		18th century	The house is rendered, and has a brick cornice, and a pantile roof with tumbled brickwork on the gable end. There are two storeys and attics, and three bays. The central doorway has pilasters, an entablature, a three-light rectangular fanlight and a cornice. It is flanked by mullioned and transomed windows, on the upper floor are sash windows, and on the roof are two gabled dormers.	II
38 and 40 Eastgate; 53.84011°N 0.42459°W		18th century	A pair of rendered houses with a pantile roof. There are two storeys and attics, and two bays. The doorways are on the right, to the left of each is a mullioned and transomed window, the upper floor contains sash windows, and on the roof are two gabled dormers.	II
42 Eastgate; 53.84005°N 0.42454°W		18th century	The building is rendered and has a pantile roof. There are two storeys and an attic, and one bay. On the ground floor is a doorway and a shop window to the right, the upper floor has a casement window, and on the roof is a gabled dormer.	II
57 Eastgate; 53.83950°N 0.42373°W		18th century	The building is in painted brick with a steep pantile roof. There are two storeys and attics, and two bays. On the ground floor is a shopfront with pilasters, an entablature and a cornice, and to the left is a doorway with a divided rectangular fanlight. The upper floor has two sash windows and one blank window to teh right, and on the roof is a gabled dormer.	II
59 Eastgate; 53.83945°N 0.42369°W		18th century	The building is in painted brick with a pantile roof. There are two storeys and attics, and two bays. On the ground floor is a shopfront with pilasters, an entablature and a cornice, and to the right is a doorway with a divided rectangular fanlight. The upper floor has two sash windows, and on the roof is a flat-roofed dormer.	II
2 Railway Street; 53.84126°N 0.42584°W		Mid-18th century (probable)	The building is in brick with a pantile roof. There are two storeys and three bays. The doorway has a shouldered moulded surround, a semicircular fanlight with a keystone, and a moulded dentilled cornice. To the left is a passage doorway with a segmental head, and the windows are sashes with segmental brick arches.	II
2A Railway Street; 53.84133°N 0.42579°W		Mid-18th century (probable)	The building is in brick, with a dentilled eaves cornice and a steep pantile roof. There are two storeys and one bay. In the centre is a doorway with a brick arch containing a stucco carved keystone with a cornice. The windows are sashes with segmental brick arches.	II
18 Toll Gavel; 53.84191°N 0.43078°W		18th century (probable)	A pair of rendered shops with widely spaced eaves brackets and a slate roof. There are three storeys and five bays. The ground floor has modern shopfronts, and the upper floors contain sash windows, those on the middle floor with moulded architraves.	II
47 and 49 Toll Gavel; 53.84183°N 0.42952°W		18th century	Two shops in painted brick with a pantile roof, and two storeys. The left shop has two bays, a modern shopfront, and sash windows above. The right shop has one bay, a 19th-century shopfront, and a modern window above.	II
51 and 53 Toll Gavel; 53.84180°N 0.42935°W		Mid-18th century	The shop is in painted brick, with a dentilled eaves cornice, and a pantile roof with tumbled brickwork on the gable ends. There are two storeys and four bays. On the ground floor is a modern shopfront, and the upper floor contains sash windows.	II
55–59 Toll Gavel; 53.84183°N 0.42914°W		18th century	A row of three shops in painted brick with pantile roofs. There are two storeys and attics, and three bays. The ground floor contains modern and 19th-century shopfronts, on the upper floor are sash windows with rendered lintels, and there are two gabled dormers.	II
25 and 25A Highgate; 53.84022°N 0.42570°W		1756	A house, later divided into two, in red brick on a plinth, with a dentilled cornice, and a pantile roof with tumbled brickwork to the gable ends and moulded kneelers. There are three storeys and six bays. The original doorway is approached by steps flanked by wrought iron rails with scrapers. It has a moulded shouldered architrave, a rectangular fanlight, a pulvinated frieze, a dentilled cornice, and an open pediment. On the right is a round-arched doorway with a radial fanlight, imposts and a triple keystone. The windows are sashes, some of which are blind, those on the lower two floors with flat gauged heads.	II
2 Highgate and 2A Lord Roberts Road; 53.84074°N 0.42633°W		1759	The house is in red brick, and has a roof mainly in pantile, the front slope in Welsh slate, and tumbled brick gables and kneelers. There are two storeys, and an L-shaped plan, with a front range of four bays, and a rear service wing. The doorway has a shouldered architrave on a plinth, a three-light decorated fanlight, a frieze with a central tablet, a moulded cornice and a pediment. To the right of the doorway is a recessed boot scraper. The windows are sashes, those on the ground floor with gauged brick lintels. To the rear of the house is a small rectangular privy.	II
47 and 49 Highgate; 53.83952°N 0.42526°W		c. 1760	A pair of houses in red brick that have parapets with moulded stone coping, and a slate roof with coped gables. There are three storeys and each house has two bays. The doorways have pilasters, rectangular fanlights and entablatures. The windows are sashes with painted stone sills and heads.	II
26 and 28 Eastgate; 53.84049°N 0.42497°W		c. 1770	A pair of houses in red brick, with a wood console eaves cornice, and a pantile roof. There are two storeys and attics, and four bays. The doorways are in the middle bays, and have architraves with finely carved mouldings, divided fanlights, transoms, friezes and dentilled cornices. The windows are sashes, those on the ground floor with stucco lintels and shutters, and on the roof are two gabled dormers. There is more fine carving inside the houses, and other items moved from elsewhere.	II*
35 Highgate; 53.83975°N 0.42542°W		Late 18th century	The house is in brick with a moulded eaves cornice and a pantile roof. There are two storeys and two bays. The doorway in the right bay has panelled pilasters, a rectangular fanlight, an entablature, and fluted consoles, and the windows are sashes.	II
37 Highgate; 53.83971°N 0.42539°W		Late 18th century	The house is in painted brick with a moulded eaves cornice and a pantile roof. There are two storeys and two bays. The doorway on the right has panelled pilasters, a rectangular fanlight, an entablature, and fluted consoles, and the windows are sashes.	II
6 St John Street; 53.83902°N 0.42599°W		Late 18th century	The house is in red brick, with a dentilled brick eaves cornice and a pantile roof. There are two storeys and attics, and three bays. The central doorway has pilasters, a plain entablature and a rectangular fanlight. The windows are sashes, those on the ground floor with painted gauged heads, and there are two gabled dormers.	II
50 Toll Gavel; 53.84167°N 0.42904°W	—	Late 18th century	A house, later a shop, in painted brick, with painted stone dressings, sill bands, paired wooden eaves brackets and a slate roof. There are three storeys and two bays. The shopfront has pilasters and a dentilled cornice. On the middle floor are two canted bay windows with entablatures, moulded cornices and panelled aprons, and the top floor has sash windows with flat brick arches.	II
Register House; 53.84083°N 0.42974°W	—	Late 18th century	The building is in red brick, with an iron gutter, and a hipped slate roof with lead hips and ridge. There are two storeys and five bays. On the front is a stone porch with panelled pilasters, an entablature and a cornice, and a doorway with a rectangular fanlight. There are two blind windows, the other windows are sashes, and all have segmental heads. On the right is a later two-storey extension, and on the east side is a Venetian window.	II
17 Toll Gavel; 53.84206°N 0.43070°W		c.1780	The shop is stuccoed, and has a brick cornice and a slate roof. There are three storeys and three bays. On the ground floor is a modern shopfront, and the upper floors contain sash windows.	II
19 and 21 Toll Gavel; 53.84205°N 0.43064°W		c.1780	The shop is in brick with a cornice of moulded brick. There are three storeys and attics, and three bays. The ground floor is rendered, and contains a modern shopfront. On the upper floors are sash windows, and above is a roof dormer.	II
Lamp standard opposite 8 St John Street; 53.83892°N 0.42581°W	—	1824–26	The lamp standard is in cast iron, and has a square stepped base with a wreathed shield with lion mask on each face. On this is an octagonal step, and a column, fluted in the lower part, the upper part tapering, surmounted by a copper lantern.	II
Lamp standard by gable of 24 Toll Gavel; 53.84177°N 0.43059°W	—	1824–26	The lamp standard is in cast iron, and has a square stepped base with a wreathed shield with lion mask on each face. On this is an octagonal step, and a column, fluted in the lower part, the upper part tapering, surmounted by a copper lantern.	II
Lamp standard east of the Minster entrance 53.83936°N 0.42516°W	—	1824–26	The lamp standard is in cast iron, and has a square stepped base with a wreathed shield with lion mask on each face. On this is an octagonal step, and a column, fluted in the lower part, the upper part tapering, surmounted by a copper lantern.	II
Lamp standard opposite The Old Minster Vicarage; 53.83951°N 0.42430°W	—	1824–26	The lamp standard is in cast iron, and has a square stepped base with a wreathed shield with lion mask on each face. On this is an octagonal step, and a column, fluted in the lower part, the upper part tapering, surmounted by a copper lantern.	II
4 Highgate; 53.84066°N 0.42625°W	—	Early 19th century	The house is in painted brick, with small eaves brackets and a slate roof. There are two storeys and two bays. The doorway on the right bay has pilasters, an entablature, a cornice, panelled reveals and a rectangular fanlight, and the windows are sashes.	II
11 Highgate; 53.84065°N 0.42596°W		Early 19th century	The house is in painted brick with a pantile roof. There are two storeys and two bays. The doorway in the right bay has a three-light divided fanlight and an architrave, the windows are sashes, and to the right is a round-arched passage entry.	II
16–24 Highgate; 53.84035°N 0.42602°W		Early 19th century	A terrace of five houses in red brick with an iron eaves gutter on brackets and a pantile roof. There are two storeys and five bays. On the front are five doorways with rectangular fanlights, the windows are sashes and all the openings have stone or painted stucco heads. To the left is a round-arched passage entry.	II
27 and 29 Highgate; 53.84012°N 0.42561°W		Early 19th century	A pair of houses in red brick on a stone plinth, with a sill band, a gutter on moulded consoles with carved paterae, and a slate roof with stone coped gables. There are two doorways, each with applied Tuscan columns, an entablature and a three-light fanlight. The windows are sashes with flat heads marked as voussoirs.	II
42–50 St Andrews Street; 53.83821°N 0.42315°W		Early 19th century	A terrace of five houses in brown brick with a pantile roof. There are two storeys and each house has one bay and a doorway on the right. The windows are sashes in moulded architraves.	II
13 and 15 Toll Gavel; 53.84210°N 0.43086°W		Early 19th century	A pair of shops in brick, the right shop rendered. There are three storeys and three bays. On the ground floor are modern shopfronts, and the upper floors contain sash windows with rendered lintels.	II
14 Toll Gavel; 53.84198°N 0.43111°W		Early 19th century	The shop is in painted brick with a slate roof. There are three storeys and two bays. On the ground floor is a modern shopfront, the middle floor contains two rounded canted bay windows, with sashes and a carved bracketed entablature. The top floor has sash windows with flat arches and voussoirs.	II
16 Toll Gavel; 53.84193°N 0.43099°W		Early 19th century	The building is in painted brick with a slate roof. There are three storeys and two bays. On the ground floor is a modern shopfront and a passageway to the right, and the upper floors contain sash windows with flat arches and voussoirs, flanked by louvred shutters.	II
58 Toll Gavel; 53.84168°N 0.42851°W	—	Early 19th century	A house, later a shop, in red brick, with painted stone dressings, a sill band, bracketed eaves and a slate roof. There are three storeys and three bays. On the ground floor is a continuous shopfront with a cornice and carved brackets. The outer bays of the middle floor contain canted bay windows with moulded cornices and hipped lead roofs. The other windows are sashes with cambered wedge lintels, raised voussoirs and keystones.	II
Lamp standard opposite 4 Minster Moorgate; 53.83933°N 0.42575°W		After 1826	The lamp standard is in cast iron, and has a square stepped base with a wreath on each face. On this is an octagonal step, and a column, fluted in the lower part, the upper part tapering, surmounted by a copper lantern.	II
Lamp standard opposite 5 St John Street; 53.83918°N 0.42586°W	—	After 1826	The lamp standard is in cast iron, and has a square stepped base with a wreath on each face. On this is an octagonal step, and a column, fluted in the lower part, the upper part tapering, surmounted by a copper lantern.	II
Lamp standard opposite 12 St John Street; 53.83870°N 0.42572°W		After 1826	The lamp standard is in cast iron, and has a square stepped base with a wreath on each face. On this is an octagonal step, and a column, fluted in the lower part, the upper part tapering, surmounted by a copper lantern.	II
Lamp standard west of the Minster entrance 53.83937°N 0.42534°W	—	After 1826	The lamp standard is in cast iron, and has a square stepped base with a wreath on each face. On this is an octagonal step, and a column, fluted in the lower part, the upper part tapering, surmounted by a copper lantern.	II
Lamp standard east of the Minster's North transept 53.83949°N 0.42456°W		After 1826	The lamp standard is in cast iron, and has a square stepped base with a wreath on each face. On this is an octagonal step, and a column, fluted in the lower part, the upper part tapering, surmounted by a copper lantern.	II
Lamp standard west of the Minster's North transept 53.83945°N 0.42484°W	—	After 1826	The lamp standard is in cast iron, and has a square stepped base with a wreath on each face. On this is an octagonal step, and a column, fluted in the lower part, the upper part tapering, surmounted by a copper lantern.	II
Hall between County Hall and the Education Department; 53.84136°N 0.42953°W		c. 1830	The building is in painted stucco on a plinth, the ground floor channelled, with rustication quoins, sill bands, an eaves cornice on block brackets, and a slate roof. There are three storeys and three bays. The ground floor windows have semicircular heads and are set in semicircular-headed recesses. The upper floors contain sash windows, those in the middle floor in architraves with leaf consoles and a shelf. Above the middle floor windows is a long tablet with projecting moulding.	II
Premises occupied by The Education Department; 53.84133°N 0.42969°W		c. 1830	The building is in painted stucco on a plinth, the ground floor channelled, with rustication quoins, sill bands, an eaves cornice on block brackets, and a hipped slate roof. There are three storeys and three bays. In the centre is a round arched doorway with a radial fanlight, flanked by round arched sash windows with reeded architraves and paterae. The upper floors contain sash windows, those in the middle floor in architraves with leaf consoles and a shelf. At the rear is a wing with two storeys and four bays, containing segmental-arched sash windows.	II
Southeast wing, County Hall; 53.84086°N 0.42878°W		c. 1831	Originally a gentlemen's club, it is on a corner site, in painted stucco, with a Greek Doric entablature. There is one storey, and three bays on each front. The bays are divided by pilasters with moulded caps. The middle bay of the east front is recessed and has two Greek Doric columns, a shouldered architrave, and a doorway with a rectangular fanlight. The outer bays contain windows with shouldered architraves and panels below. The south front contains blind windows.	II
9, 10, 11 and 12 Cross Street; 53.84104°N 0.42862°W		c. 1834	This consists of a house and flanking blocks. The house is in painted stucco, with overhanging eaves on brackets, and a hipped slate roof. There are two storeys and three bays, the middle bay recessed. In the centre is a portico with two fluted Greek Doric columns, a doorway with a fanlight, and an entablature, above which is a cast iron balcony, and a casement window. The other windows are sashes, those on the ground floor with architraves. The house is flanked by screen walls containing arched openings and panelled parapets. Outside these are blocks in white brick with one storey and three bays, and a hipped roof. The left block has a central doorway with a rectangular fanlight flanked by sash windows, all with wedge lintels. The right block has similar openings and these are blind.	II
Former Police Station; 53.84118°N 0.42986°W		c. 1835	The building is stuccoed, and has a parapet. There are two storeys and four bays. The doorway is in the right bay, and the windows are sashes with moulded architraves.	II
20–34 Railway Street; 53.84190°N 0.42462°W		c. 1840–50	A terrace of eight houses, four in red brick and four in grey brick, with a sill band, bracketed eaves, a slate roof, and three storeys. The doorways have pilasters, some panelled, some have modillion cornices, and they all have rectangular fanlights. The windows are sashes with flat stucco arches, some with incised voussoirs.	II
14–18 Railway Street; 53.84175°N 0.42516°W		c. 1846	A row of stuccoed houses with a slate roof and two storeys. The central block has four bays, and is flanked by projecting two-bay wings. The central block has a rusticated ground floor, a sill band, bracketed eaves and a hipped roof. In the centre are paired doorways, each with Doric pilasters on panelled bases, a rectangular fanlight, a frieze with triglyphs, and a cornice. The windows are sashes, those on the upper floor with shouldered moulded architraves. On the right wing is a canted bay window.	II
Beverley railway station 53.84230°N 0.42316°W		1846	The railway station was designed by G. T. Andrews for the York and North Midland Railway. It is in red brick on a plinth, with stone dressings, rusticated quoins, and a hipped slate roof. There is a single storey, a range of 15 bays, the middle seven bays projecting, and the range is flanked by three-bay arcades. The central section has a bracketed eaves cornice, and in the middle is a porch with Ionic columns, and a round-arched doorway with a rusticated surround and a semicircular fanlight. The windows are sashes in recesses. Over the track is a glazed canopy, and a footbridge.	II
13–33 Railway Street; 53.84207°N 0.42480°W		Late 1840s	A terrace of eleven houses in brick, with three storeys. No. 13 has three bays, and the others have two. The doorways have engaged fluted Ionic columns, entablatures and rectangular fanlights; No. 13 also has a moulded pediment. The windows are sashes with carved lintels.	II
35 Railway Street and premises occupied by the Beverley Catholic Club; 53.84215°N 0.42428°W		Late 1840s	The building, on a corner site, is in red brick with a slate roof. There are three storeys, five bays on Railway Street and three on Trinity Lane. The windows are sashes with rendered flat arches. On the left on Railway Street is a plain doorway, and in the centre of the Trinity Lane front is a carriage entry with a cambered arch with incised voussoirs.	II
36 and 38 Railway Street; 53.84200°N 0.42420°W		1849	The building, on a corner site, is stuccoed, and has a floor band, shallow flat eaves on spaced brackets, and a low hipped slate roof. There are three storeys, four bays on Railway Street, three on Trinity Lane, and a canted bay on the corner. On the Railway Street front are paired doorways and sash windows. On the corner bay is a doorway with a rectangular fanlight and a dentilled cornice. The Trinity Street front has a central doorway, above which is a window in a round-arched recess.	II
1–5 St John Street and 1 Minster Moorgate; 53.83920°N 0.42607°W		Mid-19th century	A terrace of houses in brick on a brick plinth, with bracketed eaves, a Welsh slate roof, and two storeys. The doorways, most of which are paired, have pilasters, rectangular fanlights and cornices. On the ground floor are canted bay windows with pilasters, entablatures and cornices, and the upper floor has sash windows with flat or rounded heads.	II
Former 48 Toll Gavel; 53.84163°N 0.42914°W		Mid-19th century	The shop on a corner site is in painted stucco, and has sill bands, paired eaves brackets, and a slate roof hipped on the corner. There are three storeys, one bay on Toll Gavel and two on Cross Street. On the ground floor are 19th-century shopfronts, and the upper floors contain sash windows.	II
Masonic Lodge; 53.84121°N 0.42477°W		1856	Originally a Wesleyan Reform Chapel, the hall is rendered, on a plinth, and has an entablature, and a pediment containing a roundel framed in guilloché. There are two storeys and three bays flanked by Corinthian pilasters. In the centre is a doorway with imposts, an architrave and a decorated frieze. Above the doorway is a roundel with a Masonic motif. The windows are sashes, those in the ground floor with raised panels below and decorated mouldings above.	II
Beverley Minster Parish Hall; 53.83964°N 0.42480°W		1885	The parish hall, originally the Minster Girls' School, is in red brick, with stone details, quoins and red tile roofs. It consists of two gabled ranges. The right range has a large three-light window, and a cross finial. On the left is a porch containing a doorway with a pointed head. The left range, slightly recessed, contains a large oculus with three quatrefoils, and on the apex is a decorated bellcote with a flèche. To the left is a pointed doorway under a stepped parapet.	II
County Hall; 53.84109°N 0.42904°W		1891	The building, designed by Smith and Brodrick, is in red brick with stone bands, stone dressings and a tile roof, and is in two parts. The left part has elaborately shaped gables, and two full-height canted bay windows with mullioned and transomed windows. The decorative doorway has attached columns, a round-arched entrance with a mask keystone and a decorated frieze, above which is a terracotta cartouche with a mask and swags. The right part is plainer, and has four gables, one with a cross finial, and a porch with fluted columns and a pediment.	II
Former Baptist Church; 53.84029°N 0.42819°W		1910	The church, later used for other purposes, is in red brick with stone dressings and a slate roof. On the front is a slightly projecting stone porch containing two segmental-headed doorways with moulded reveals, and traceried panels above. Over these is a large semicircular-headed traceried window, on the roof is a wooden bellcote, and on the left is a staircase projection.	II
Signal box 53.84164°N 0.42302°W		1911	The signal box, to the south of Beverley railway station, was built by the North Eastern Railway. It is in red brick with stone dressings, weatherboarding on the upper floor, and it has a Welsh slate roof with bargeboards and finials. There are two storeys and a rectangular plan, and the entrance is by a timber external stairway. On the upper floor are small-paned horizontally sliding windows, and a railed balcony on brackets on the side of the line.	II

== See also ==
- Listed buildings in Beverley (central and northeast areas)
- Listed buildings in Beverley (west and southwest areas)
- Listed buildings in Beverley (southeast area)
- Listed buildings in Beverley (north area)
