= 8–11 St John Street =

Building in Beverley, East Riding of Yorkshire, England

Coordinates: 53.8388°N 0.426°W

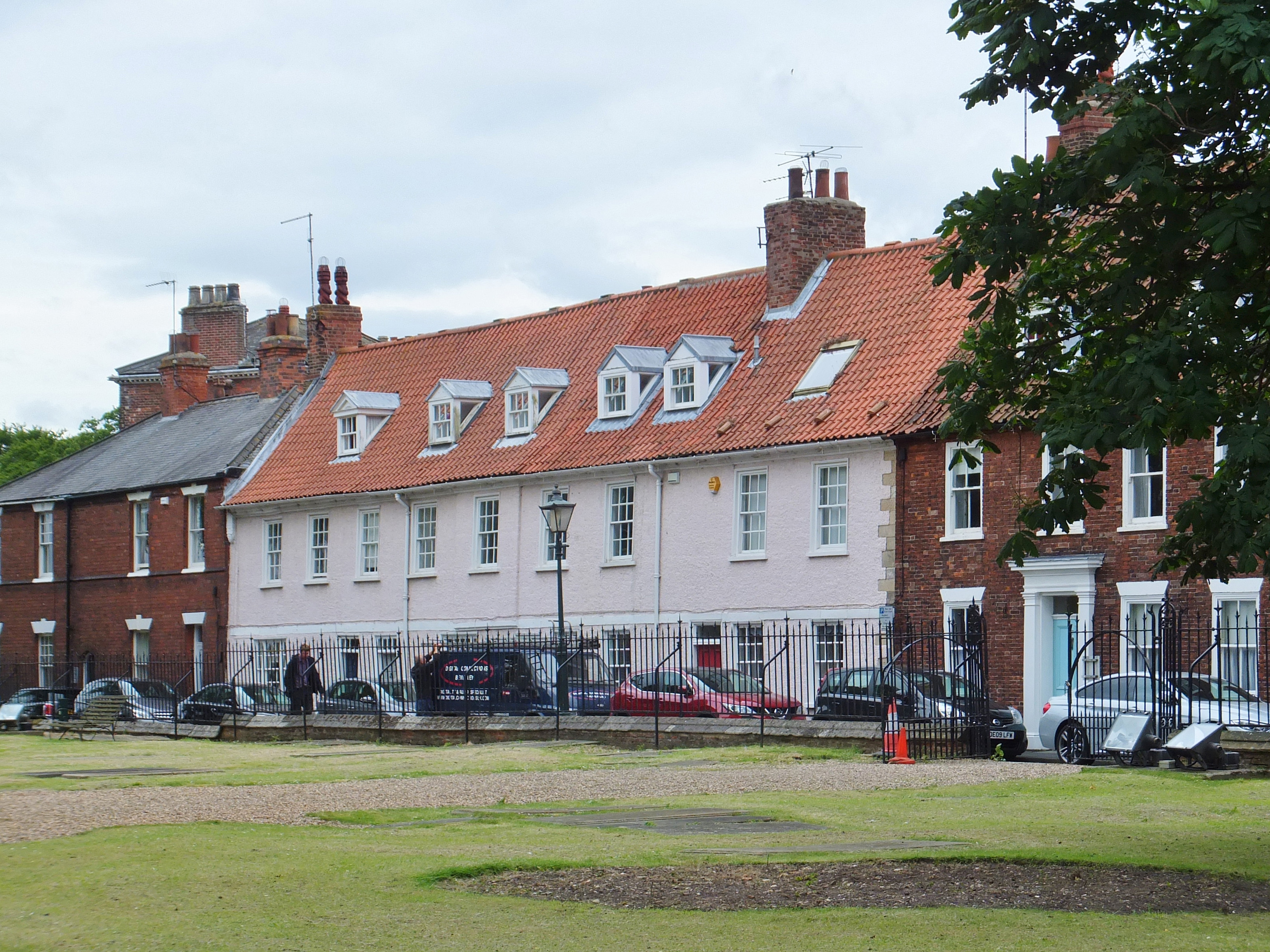
The building, in 2015

8–11 St John Street is a historic building in Beverley, a town in the East Riding of Yorkshire, in England.

The Bedern, the refectory and dormitory for most of the clergy of Beverley Minster, was first recorded in 1237. By 1304, it had two halls, two kitchens, and various smaller rooms. A tower was added in the early 15th century, and John Leland noted its impressive gate and front. Other houses were gradually built for many of the clergy, and the building was demolished. Its site is not known with certainty, but it is generally believed that it lay on the west side of St John Street. In the late 17th century, a house was built on the site, incorporating some Mediaeval stonework inside and in its foundations. The building was refronted in the early 18th century, and further altered in later centuries, the work including its division into three houses. It was grade II listed in 1950.

The building is pebbledashed and has stone rusticated quoins on the right, a string course, a moulded eaves cornice, and a pantile roof. It has two storeys and attics, and is nine bays wide. The doorways have divided rectangular fanlights, the windows are sashes, some tripartite, and there are gabled dormers. Inside the houses is some surviving medieval stonework, and built into the eaves bracket at the south end is a sculpted medieval head. The original staircase survives in a tower at the rear of number 8, and there are also some early fireplaces.

== See also ==
- Listed buildings in Beverley (south area)
