= Beverley Masonic Hall =

Building in Beverley, East Riding of Yorkshire, England

Coordinates: 53.8412°N 0.4246°W

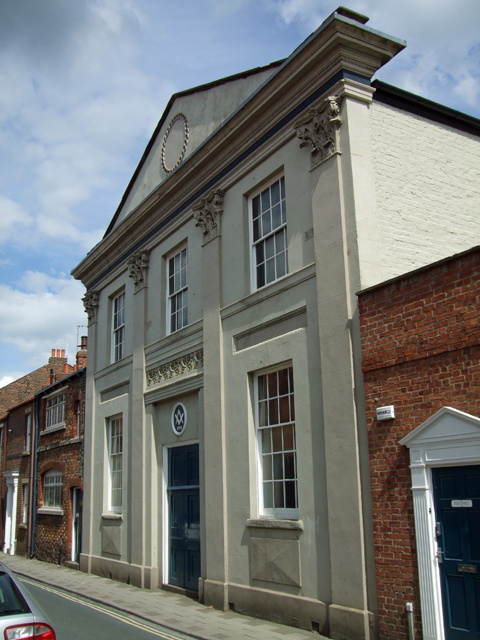
The building, in 2008

Beverley Masonic Hall is a historic building in Beverley, a town in the East Riding of Yorkshire, in England.

The building was constructed in 1856, for the Methodist Reform Church. The following year, the Reformers joined the United Methodist Free Churches, and in 1907 this became part of the new United Methodist Church. In 1926, the church building was closed, and converted into a masonic lodge. The building was grade II listed in 1987.

The hall is rendered, on a plinth, and has an entablature, and a pediment containing a roundel framed in guilloché. It has two storeys and three bays flanked by Corinthian pilasters. In the centre is a doorway with imposts, an architrave and a decorated frieze. Above the doorway is a roundel with a Masonic motif. The windows are sashes, those in the ground floor with raised panels below and decorated mouldings above.

== See also ==
- Listed buildings in Beverley (south area)
