= Culham Court =

Culham Court may refer to

- Culham Court, Berkshire, a Grade II* listed house near Remenham in Berkshire, England
- Culham Court, Oxfordshire, a Grade II listed house near Abingdon in Oxfordshire, England
