= Corn Exchange, Beverley =

Commercial building in Beverley, East Riding of Yorkshire, England

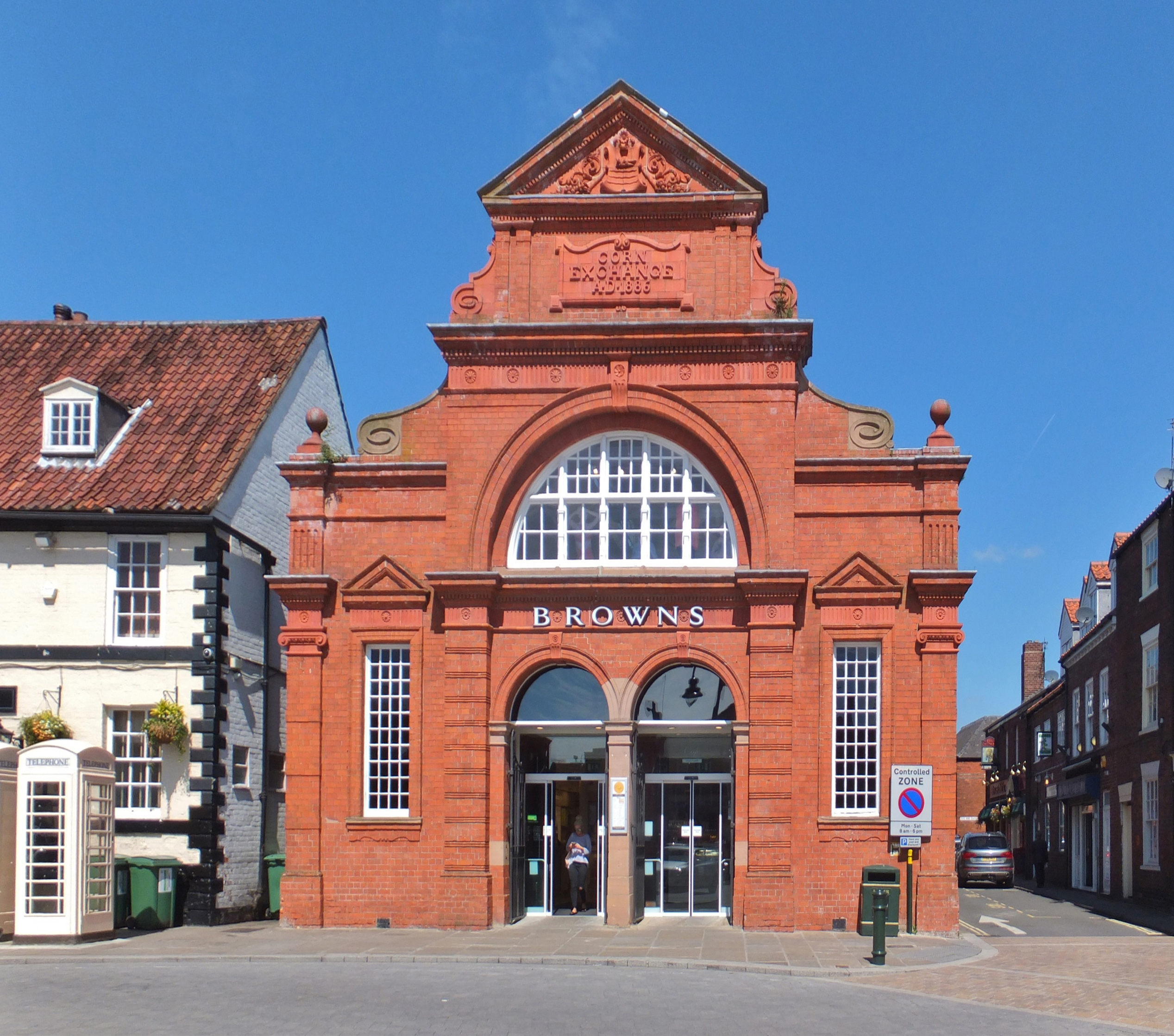
- Corn Exchange, Beverley

- Shown in the East Riding of Yorkshire
- 53.8429°N 0.4318°W
- Location: Saturday Market, Beverley

History
- Built: 1886

Site notes
- Architect: Samuel Musgrave
- Architectural style: Italianate style

Listed Building – Grade II
- Official name: The Former Corn Exchange
- Designated: 30 June 1987
- Reference no.: 1083969

The Corn Exchange is a commercial building in the Saturday Market, Beverley, East Riding of Yorkshire, England. The structure, which was commissioned as a corn exchange and is now used as a department store, is a Grade II listed building.

== History ==
The site occupied by the corn exchange was formerly an open meat market from the 14th century. A butchers' shambles, designed by Samuel Smith, was erected on the site in 1753. Part of it was converted into a corn exchange in 1825, and another part of it was converted into a butter market in 1834, but, in the early 1880s, Beverley Corporation decided to commission a new structure on the same site.

The current structure was designed by Samuel Musgrave in the Italianate style, built in red brick and terracotta and was completed in 1886. The design involved a symmetrical main frontage of three bays facing onto the Saturday Market. The central bay featured two round headed openings with architraves and keystones flanked by Doric order pilasters supporting an entablature and a cornice. There was a Diocletian window with an architrave and a keystone on the first floor. The outer bays were fenestrated by tall casement windows with pediments and flanked, on the outside, by Ionic order pilasters surmounted by ball finials. At roof level there was a central panel inscribed with the words "Corn Exchange AD 1886", flanked by scrolls and surmounted by a modillioned pediment with the borough coat of arms in the tympanum.

The use of the building as a corn exchange declined significantly in the wake of the Great Depression of British Agriculture in the late 19th century. In this context, the building was briefly used as a primary school between 1904 and 1906 and was then converted for use as a cinema showing silent films, operated Ernest Symmons and known as the "Beverley Picture Playhouse", in 1911. During the Second World War, part of the building was requisitioned for use as a decontamination centre in the event of gas attacks. It also hosted fund raising events in support of Warship Week in 1942.

The building continued to operate as a cinema under the management of the Symmons family until September 1963 when it closed. It re-opened again under the management of a film society in 1972 and became a commercial cinema and events venue in April 1982 but, in the face of increased competition, closed again in 2003. After an extensive programme of works to convert the building for retail use, it re-opened as a Browns department store in March 2010. The conversion was highly commended for the Local Authority Building Control (LABC) National Building Excellence Awards in November 2010.

== See also ==
- Corn exchanges in England
- Listed buildings in Beverley (central and northeast areas)
