= East Riding Theatre =

English theatre and café

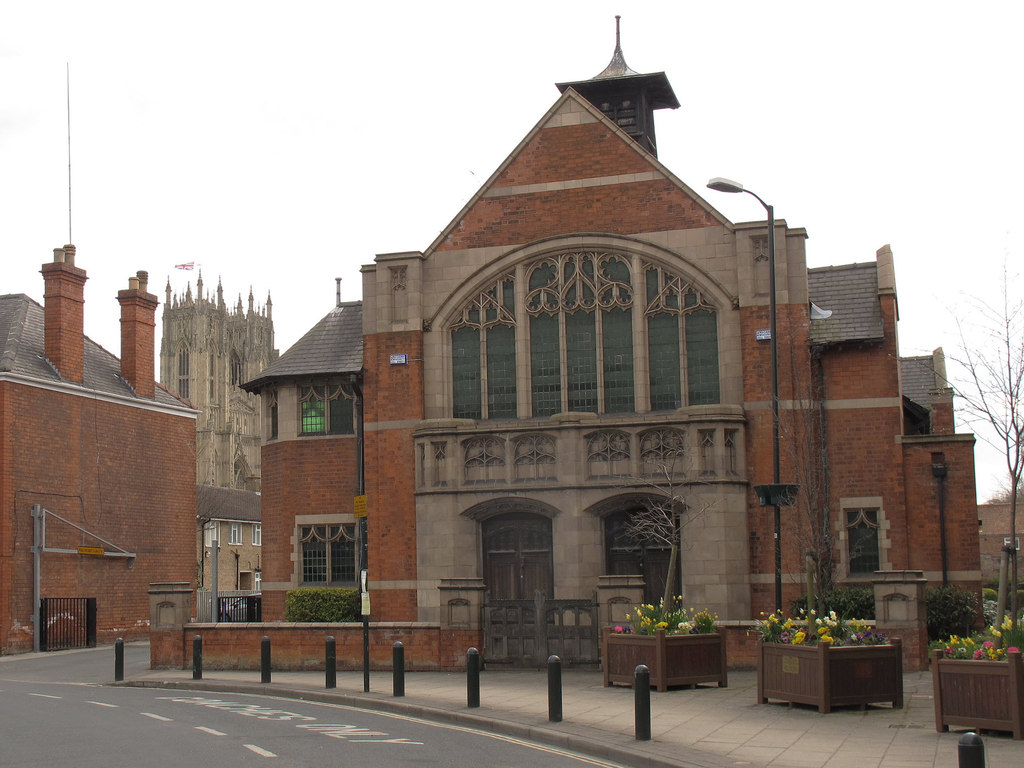
- Interactive map of East Riding Theatre
- Address: 10 Lord Roberts Road; Beverley; England
- Coordinates: 53.840166°N 0.428014°W
- Capacity: 192
- Type: Stage theatre
- Designation: Grade II listed

Construction
- Built: as a church in 1910 converted to a theatre 2013
- Opened: 2014
- Architect: George Pennington

Website
- eastridingtheatre.co.uk

East Riding Theatre, is a theatre and café in a converted former Baptist church located in Beverley in the East Riding of Yorkshire.

== Building ==
The building was designed by G. F. Pennington in the "English Free" style. It is constructed of red brick with stone dressings and a slate roof. On the front is a slightly projecting stone porch containing two segmental-headed doorways with moulded reveals, and traceried panels above. Over these is a large semicircular-headed traceried window, on the roof is a wooden bellcote, and on the left is a staircase projection. It has a seating capacity of 192 with a thrust stage.

== History ==
The building originally opened as a Particular Baptist church in 1910. It closed in 1964 and came into the ownership of the East Riding of Yorkshire Council. For some time, it was used as a venue for local people to receive vaccinations. Between 1995 and 2007, it was home to the council's archives. In April 2013, the East Riding of Yorkshire Council approved planning for the conversion of the building into a theatre, which opened in 2014.

The theatre's founder and original artistic director was Vincent Regan, who instead of using Arts Council or Lottery funding, used sponsorship from local businesses. A significant amount of funding also came from the building being used in the filming of Dad's Army (2016).

In 2017, Adrian Rawlins took over the role of artistic director, and the role later went to Richard Avery.

== See also ==
- Listed buildings in Beverley (south area)
