= Old Vicarage, Beverley =

Clergy house in Beverley, East Riding of Yorkshire, England

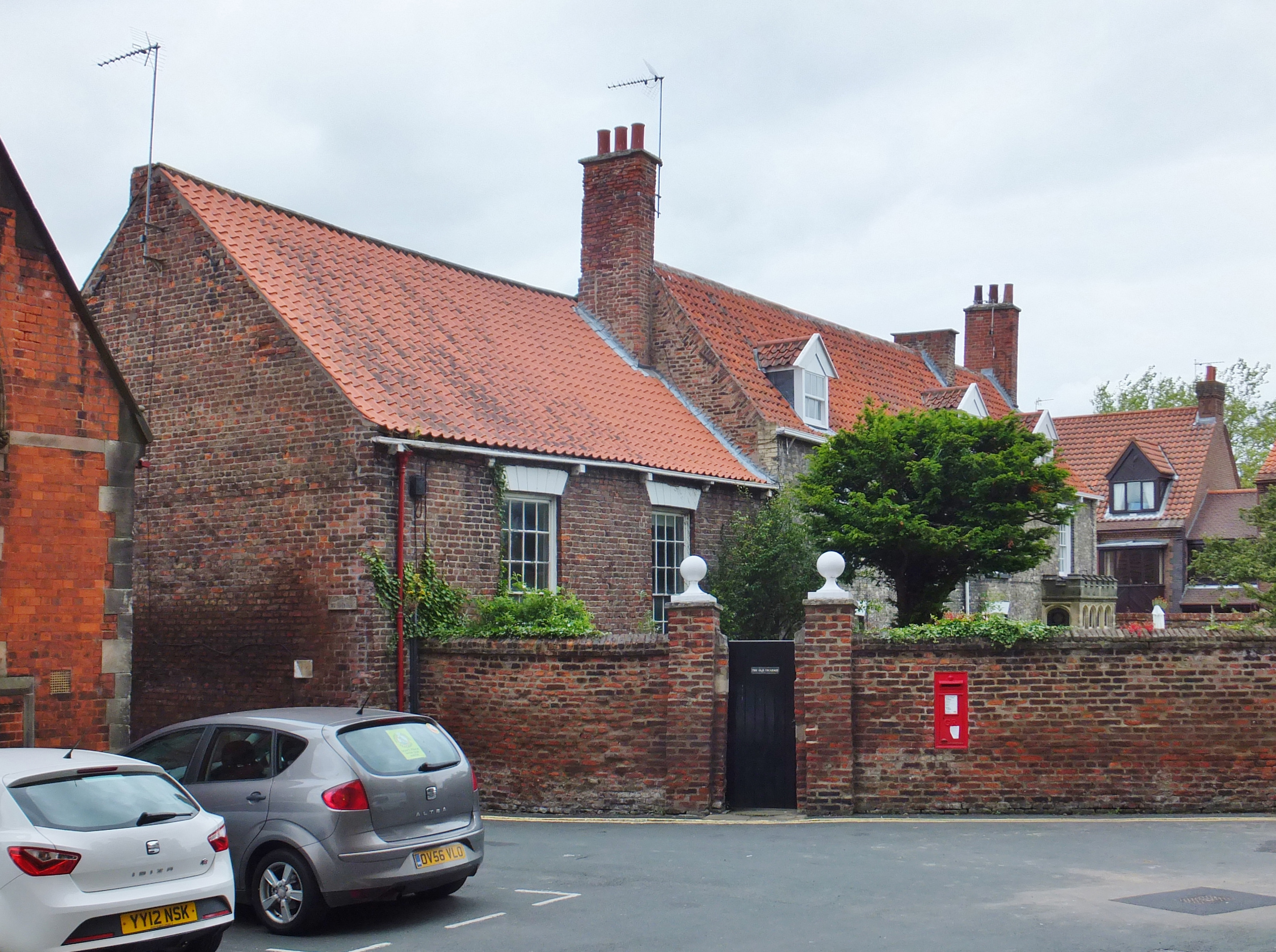
The building, in 2015

The Old Vicarage is a historic building in Beverley, a town in the East Riding of Yorkshire, in England.

The house was constructed in the Mediaeval period, as the vicarage of Beverley Minster. It was largely rebuilt in 1704, was refronted around 1820, and was extended to the right in 1886. The building was grade II listed in 1950.

The house is built of white brick and has two storeys and attics. The front facing Eastgate has a slate roof and three bays, and contains blank windows with stone arched heads and carved keystones. The doorway has reeded jambs with paterae, and a fanlight. The front facing Minster Yard has a pantile roof and four bays, and contains a Gothic-style bay window, a doorway and sash windows. To the left is a single-storey two-bay wing. Inside, the staircase is early-18th century, and one ground floor room has panelling and a fireplace of similar date. There are four linenfold panels, which are said to have come from Old Suffolk Place in Kingston upon Hull.

== See also ==
- Listed buildings in Beverley (south area)
