= Beverley Friary =

Former religious houses in Beverley, East Riding of Yorkshire, England

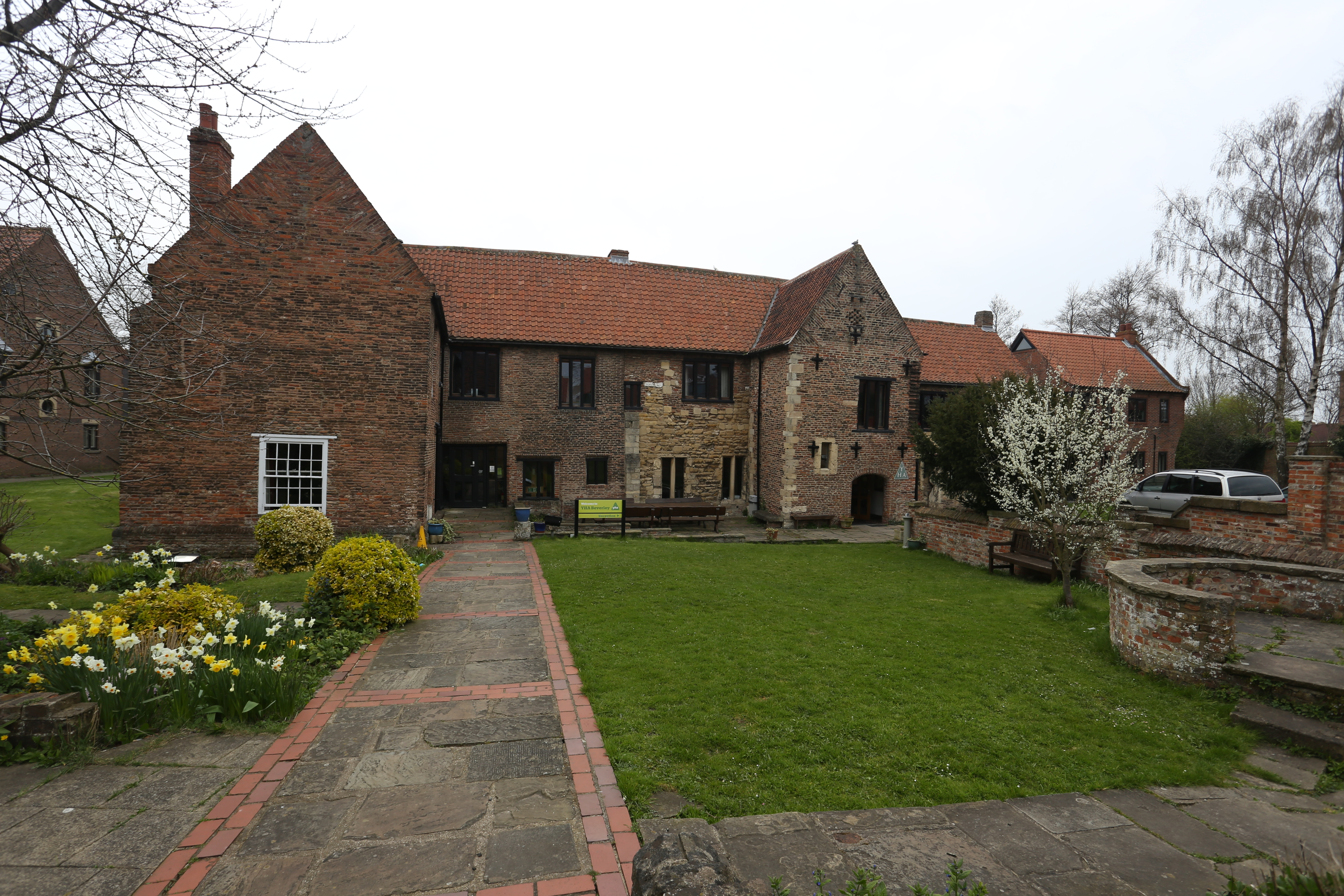
- Beverley Friary

- Location of Beverley Friary in the East Riding of Yorkshire
- 53°50′24″N 0°25′23″W
- Location: Beverley
- OS grid reference: TA038393

Site notes
- Area: East Riding of Yorkshire, England

Listed Building – Grade II*
- Designated: 1 March 1950
- Reference no.: 1084062

Beverley Friary (also known as The Old Friary) is a row of buildings in Beverley, East Riding of Yorkshire, England. It is a Grade II* listed building and has been used since 1984 as a youth hostel.

== Beverly Blackfriars ==
A Dominican priory was first established in Beverley c. 1240. The Dominican order were given an area of land close to Beverley Minster by the Archbishop of York who was also the lord of Beverley. On this site the Dominican friars built their first priory; probably of timber until the cost of stone could be afforded.

As the community flourished and money became available, the priory was extended and in the early 14th century an extension to the south-west of the cloister saw the construction of a building to accommodate guests. This forms the core of the present buildings, which retain a doorway of this date.

By the end of the 14th century the priory was at its maximum extent and the next 150 years saw a gradual decline in the community and a contraction in the use of the buildings. A bad fire in 1449 destroyed the dormitory and library. Restoration was done with royal support. Two brick gateways were built in the 16th century, one in Friars Lane and the other since moved to Eastgate.

In 1539 the friars were expelled in the Dissolution of the Monasteries and the friary was destroyed. Many of the buildings were pulled down and the material reused elsewhere. The guesthouse is thought to have escaped demolition because it was not being used directly for religious purposes. An alternative theory for the existence of the current buildings is that they were constructed on the site of the guest house using materials recovered from elsewhere on the site.

== History since Dissolution ==
In 1544 the guesthouse was sold to John Pope and Anthony Foster. At some later date it was sold again to the Wharton family, who added a projecting wing. It was sold again to the Earls of Yarborough, and finally in 1826 it was acquired by Richard Whiting whose family continued to own part of the property until 1960.

The remainder of the surviving conventual buildings were used for a variety of purposes but in the 19th century most of them were demolished for the building of the railway between Hull and Bridlington. The guesthouse became three separate dwelling houses during the 19th century, numbers 7, 9 and 11 Friary Lane, and continued this use until the 1960s. At this time ownership passed to Armstrong Patents Co ltd who owned the adjacent factory and in 1962 Armstrong's applied for permission to demolish the buildings. Permission was refused and the houses made the subject of a preservation order with preservation work commencing in 1974. Excavations in 1960-63 and 1986-87 revealed parts of the church and two cloisters.

The buildings are now owned by East Riding of Yorkshire Council who maintain the buildings with the assistance of the Beverley Friary Preservation Trust. In 1984 the buildings were rented to YHA (England and Wales) who operated a youth hostel on the site until 2025.

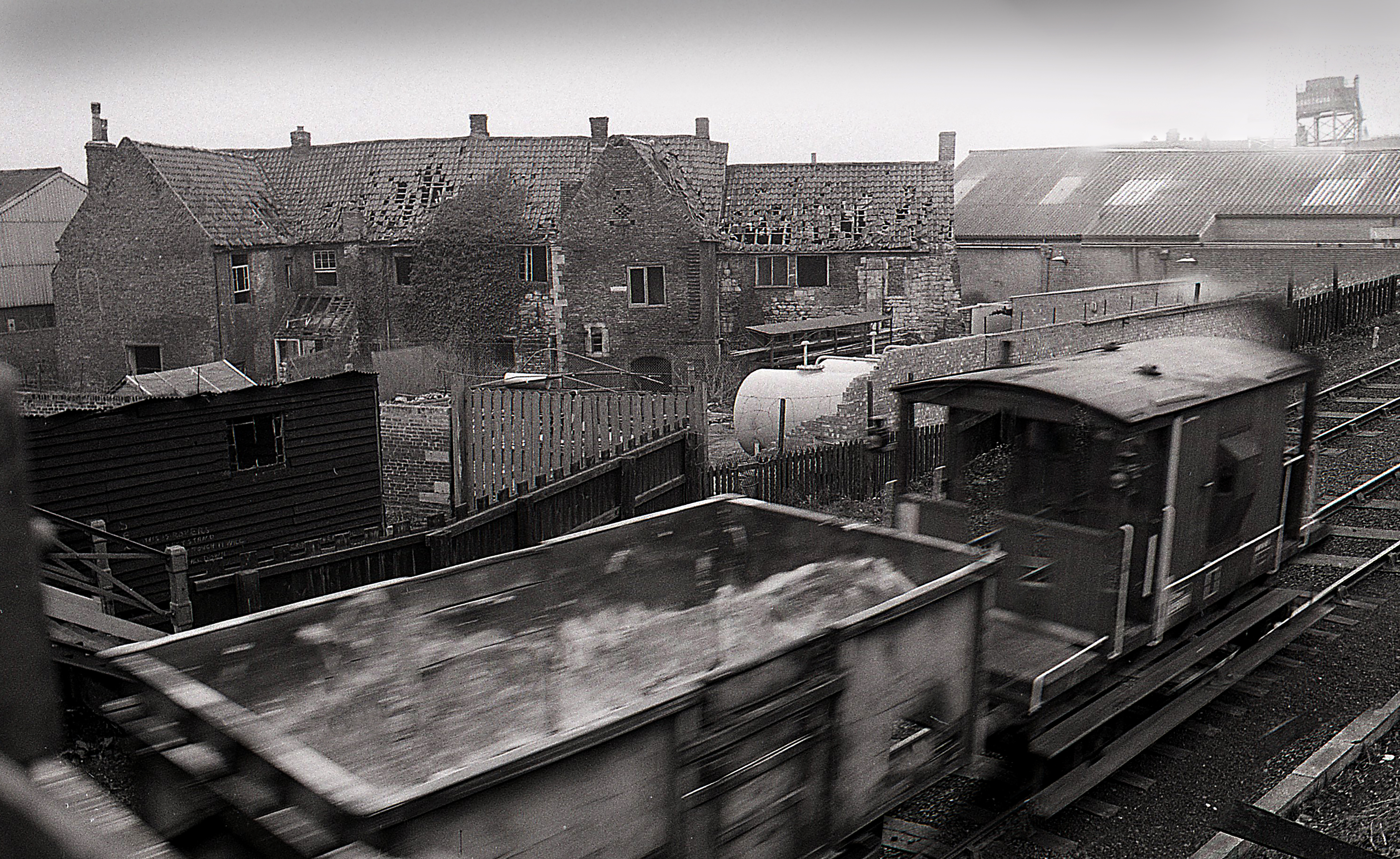
Beverley Friary in ruin next to the rail tracks in 1971

== Construction ==
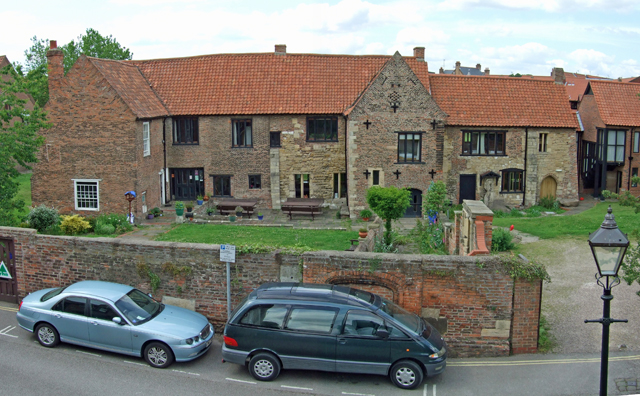
Beverley Friary

The buildings are a mix of brick and stone construction and stands on the stone footings of one of the earlier friary buildings. Some of the brickwork exhibits a diaper pattern using sunken bricks. The brick eastern portion may date from a rebuilding after the 1449 fire, with Henry VI as the patron. At this time the Crown was the patron of other major brick buildings, including Eton College and Queens' College, Cambridge. The roof is tiled and the internal partition walls are timber framed. Within the westernmost building a number of painted wall plasters dating from about the time of the Dissolution were discovered during the restoration work. A panelled room in the building is dated to the late 16th or early 17th century.

== See also ==
- Grade II* listed buildings in the East Riding of Yorkshire
- Listed buildings in Beverley (south area)

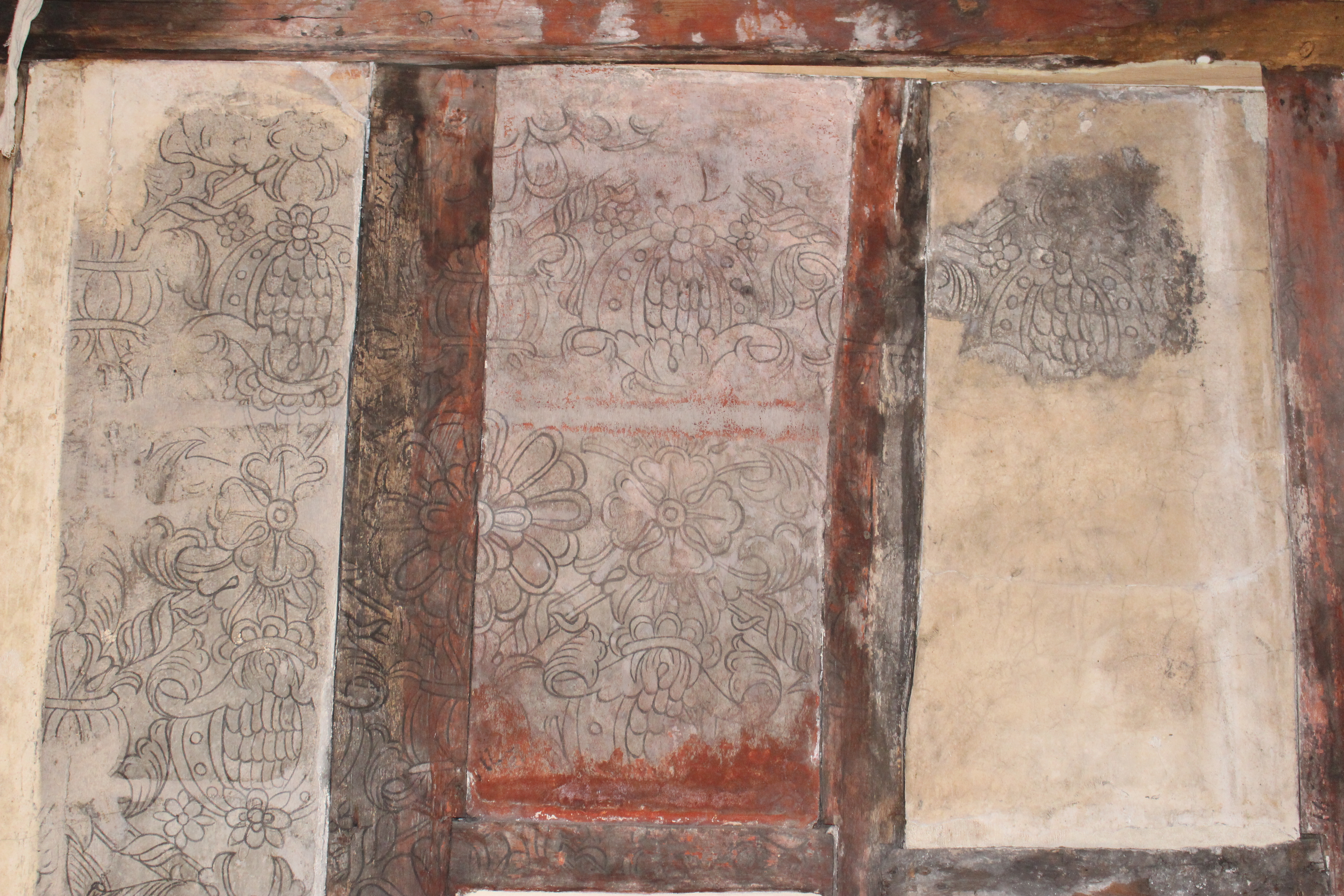
15th century wall painting on the first floor of the Old Friary
