= The Sun Inn =

Pub in Beverley, East Riding of Yorkshire, England

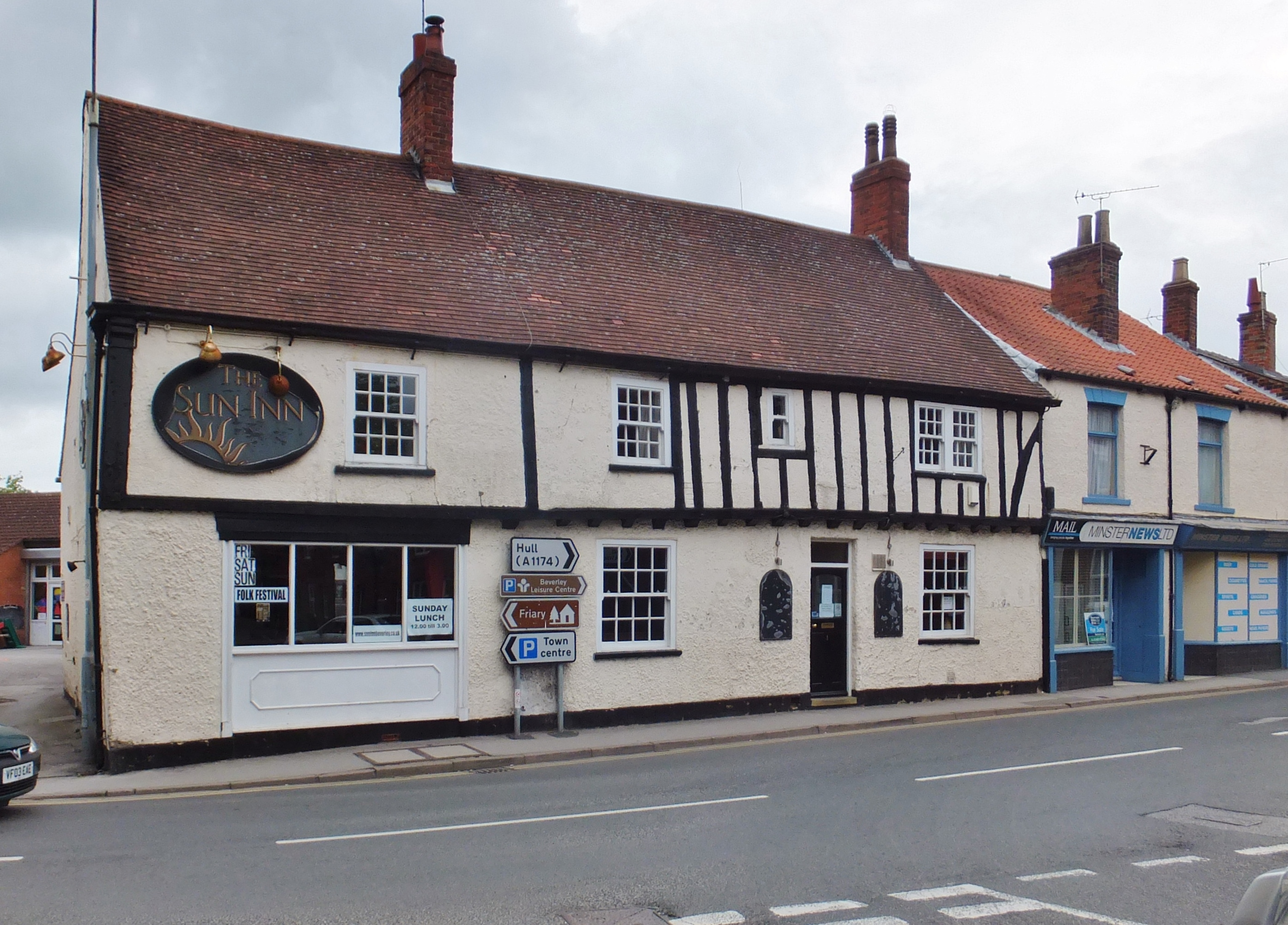
The pub, in 2015

The Sun Inn is a historic pub in Beverley, a town in the East Riding of Yorkshire, in England.

The timber-framed pub was probably built in the 16th century and was altered in the late 18th century. It may be the oldest pub in the East Riding. The interior has been altered and is now open plan, with a flagstone floor around the bar. The building was grade II listed in 1969. In the early 21st century, it was known as a venue for live music, and began serving food. The courtyard beer garden has views of Beverley Minster.

The ground floor of the public house is in colourwashed brick, the upper storey is jettied on plain corbels and is timber framed, and the roof is tiled, with tumbled brickwork on the gable end. There are two storeys and three bays. The ground floor contains a doorway with a rectangular fanlight, on the left is a shopfront converted into a window, and the other windows are sashes.

== See also ==
- Listed buildings in Beverley (south area)
