= The Old Vicarage, Wakefield =

Historical site in England

Coordinates: 53.6836°N 1.4945°W

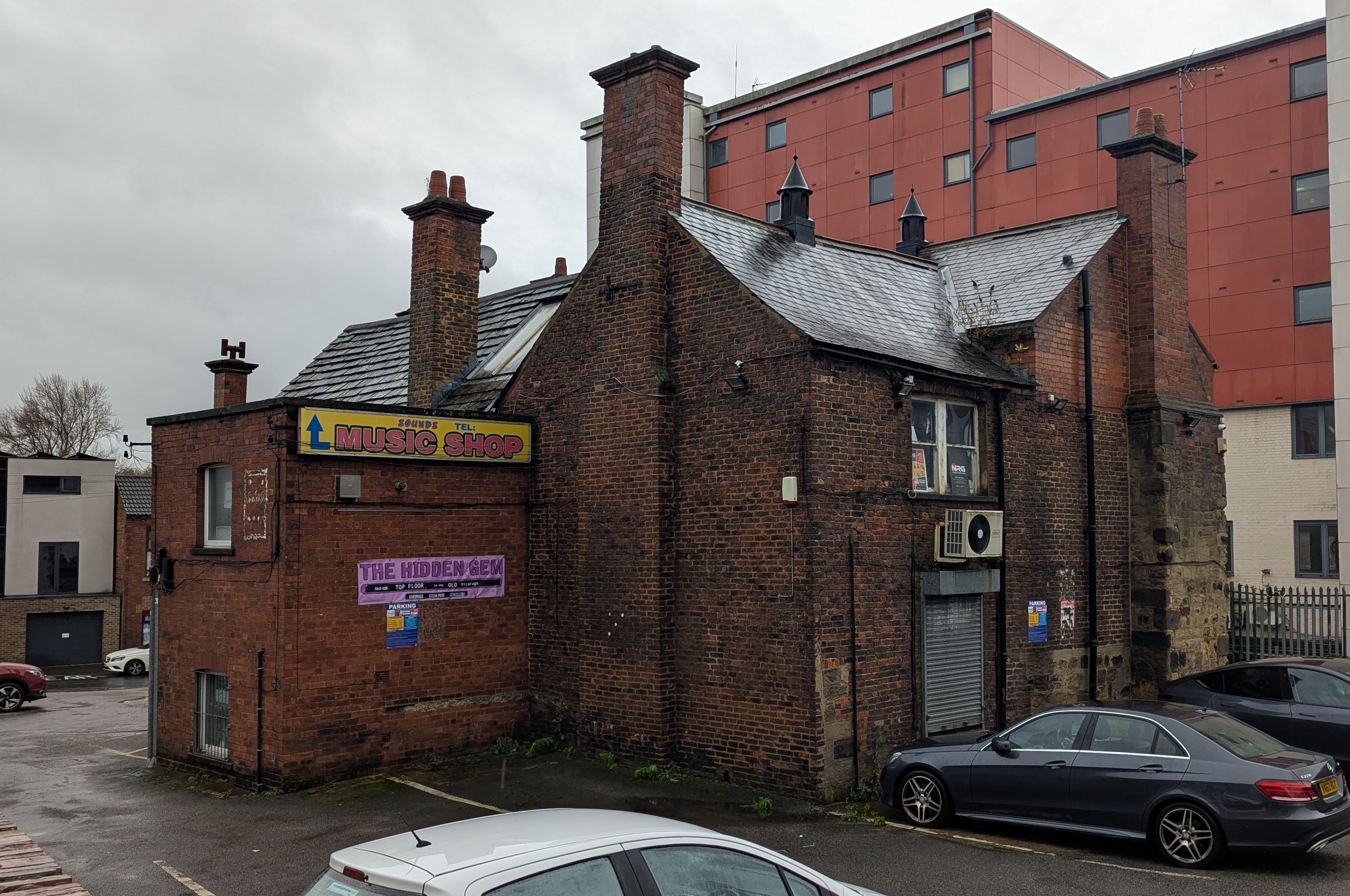
The building, seen from the west

The Old Vicarage in Wakefield, West Yorkshire, England is a building dating from c. 1349.

Located on Zetland Street, the building and surrounding car park are linked to a network of tunnels, believed to be used by non-conformists after the Act of Uniformity was passed in 1662.

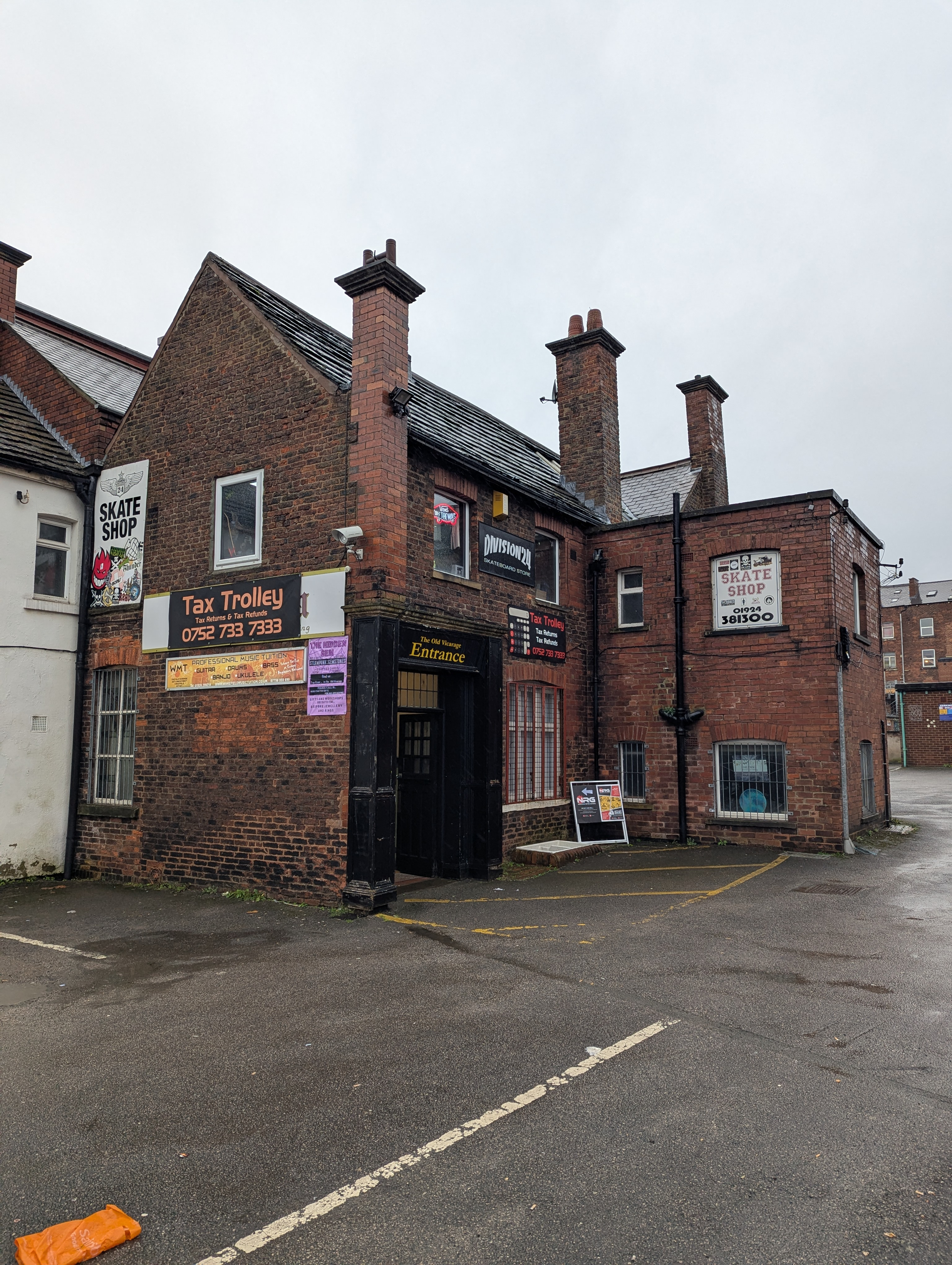
View from the east

The Old Vicarage is owned by the Wakefield County Conservative Association and is currently occupied by independent shops.
