= Culham Court, Oxfordshire =

House in Oxfordshire, England

Coordinates: 51.653644°N 1.2698063°W

Culham Court is a Grade II listed house in Culham, Oxfordshire, England.

== History ==
It was built in the mid-18th century, the south front in about 1816, and with 20th-century alterations.

It was originally called the Old Vicarage and is said to have been built for Benjamin Kennicott, Vicar of Culham (1753–83) in about 1758.
