= Beverley =

Market town in the East Riding of Yorkshire, England

Coordinates: 53°50′37″N 0°25′48″W

- Town and civil parish
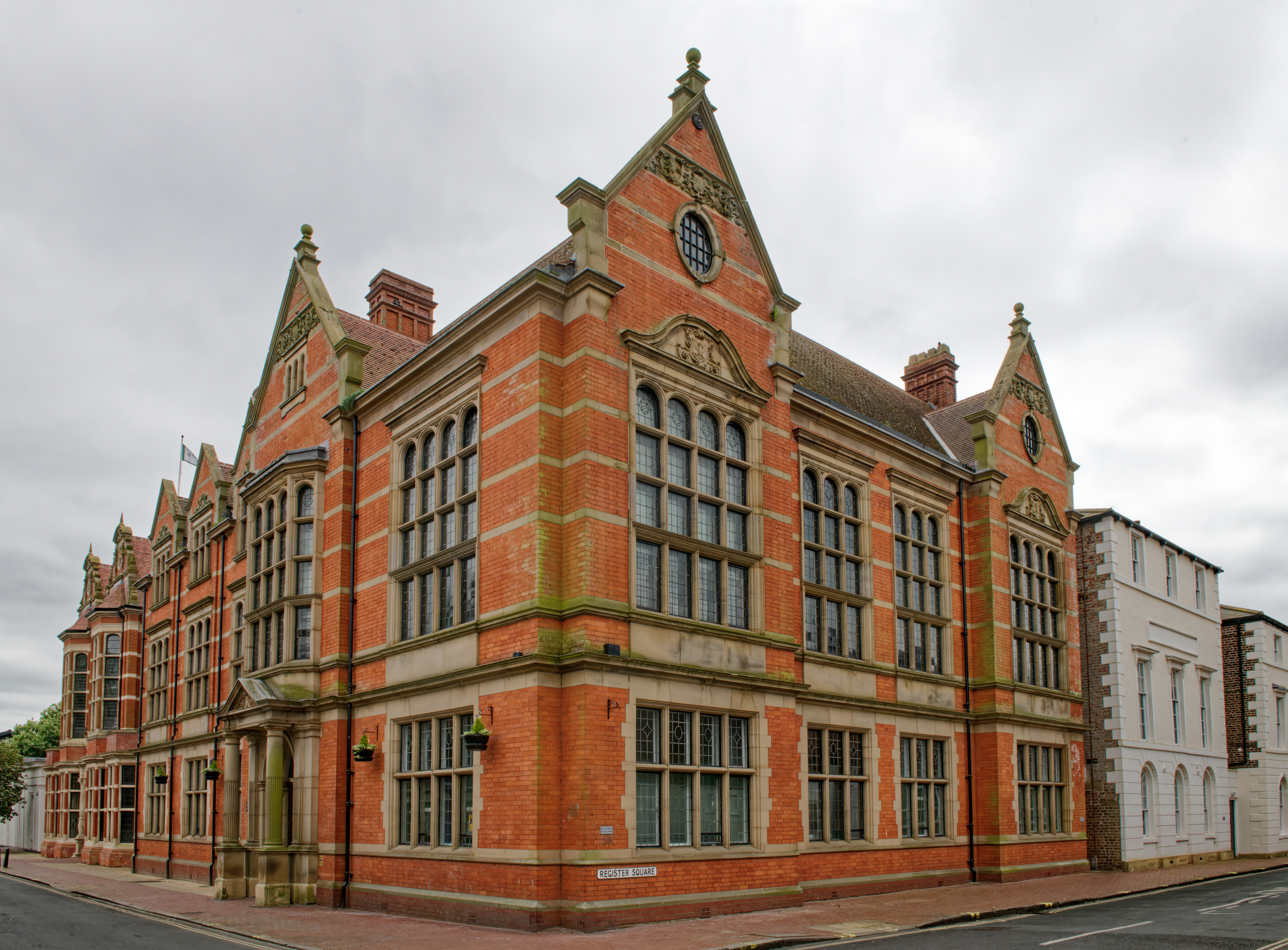
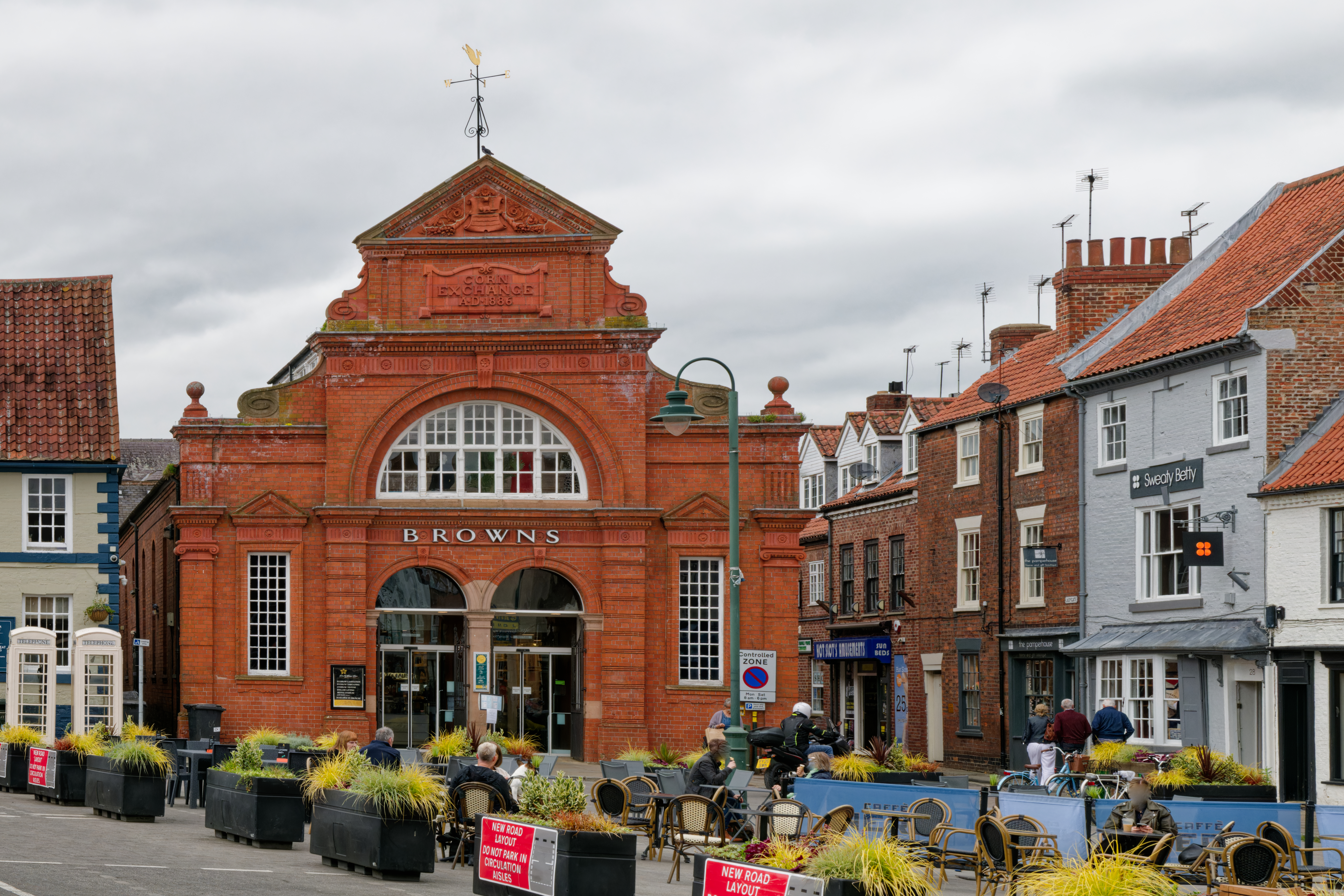
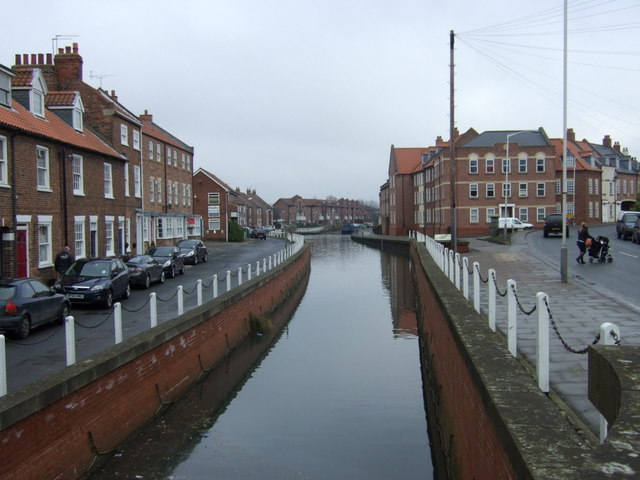
- County Hall Beverley Bar Choir of Beverley Minster Old Corn Exchange Beverley Beck

- Coat of arms of Beverley Town Council

- Location within the East Riding of Yorkshire
- Population: 30,930 (2021 Census)
- OS grid reference: TA035399
- Civil parish: Beverley
- Unitary authority: East Riding of Yorkshire
- Ceremonial county: East Riding of Yorkshire
- Region: Yorkshire and the Humber
- Country: England
- Sovereign state: United Kingdom
- Post town: BEVERLEY
- Postcode district: HU17
- Dialling code: 01482
- Police: Humberside
- Fire: Humberside
- Ambulance: Yorkshire
- UK Parliament: Beverley and Holderness
- Website: www.beverley.gov.uk

Beverley is a market town and civil parish in the East Riding of Yorkshire, England. It is located 8 miles (13 km) north-west of Hull city centre. At the 2021 census the built-up area of the town had a population of 30,930, and the smaller civil parish had a population of 18,014. It is the county town of the East Riding of Yorkshire.

The town was founded in the seventh century by John of Beverley, who established a church in the area. It was originally named Inderawuda, and was part of the Anglian kingdom of Northumbria. The town came under Viking control in the 850s, then became part of the Kingdom of England. John of Beverley was made a saint in 1037, and the town was a place of pilgrimage for the remainder of the Middle Ages. It continued to grow under the Normans, when its trading industry was first established, and eventually became a significant wool-trading town and the eleventh-largest settlement in England. After the Reformation, the stature of Beverley was much reduced.

West front of Beverley Minster

The town contains several landmarks, including Beverley Minster, Westwood common, North Bar gatehouse, St Mary's Church, and Beverley Racecourse. It inspired the naming of the city of Beverly, Massachusetts, which in turn was the indirect source of the name for Beverly Hills, California, which was named after its Beverly Farms neighbourhood.

== History ==
=== Northumbrian and Viking period ===
Nave of Beverley Minster, foundation place of Beverley

The origins of Beverley can be traced back to the time of the Anglian kingdom of Northumbria in the 7th century. The first structure built in the area, which at the time was known as Inderawuda (meaning "in the wood of the men of Deira"), was a Christian church dedicated to St John the Evangelist. This was founded by the Bishop of York who later became known as John of Beverley, who was believed to have performed miracles during his lifetime, and was later venerated as a saint. Around the 850s, the now developed monastery was abandoned in a hurry; historians presume this was because of the invasion of the so-called Great Heathen Army of Vikings who had invaded England, and established the Kingdom of Jórvík in the Yorkshire area. However, the population was increased during the 10th century, by people who came to venerate Saint John of Beverley.

Before the Battle of Brunanburh, possibly located further north than Beverley, the King of England at the time Athelstan visited Inderawuda, he prayed all night and saw a vision saying he would be victorious: in return he helped the town to grow greatly. The name of the town was changed to Bevreli or Beverlac, meaning beaver-clearing or beaver-lake, in the 10th century; a reference to the colonies of beavers in the River Hull at the time. The last three Anglo-Saxon archbishops of York helped Beverley to develop, via the rise in prominence of Beverley Minster and the town in general; along with York itself, Ripon and Southwell, Beverley became one of the most important Christian centres of Northern England. Ealdred was declared by king Edward the Confessor as "sole Lord of the manor of Beverley". Beverley developed as a trade centre, producing textiles, leather and objects made out of antler. Beverley Minster was constructed in 1220 and there were three phases to its construction. 1220–1260, 1320–1348 Stopped during the Black death and again in 1420–1440 but Beverley Minster is not complete. The chapter house was demolished in 1660 and only the doors remain in the church.

=== Normans and the Middle Ages ===
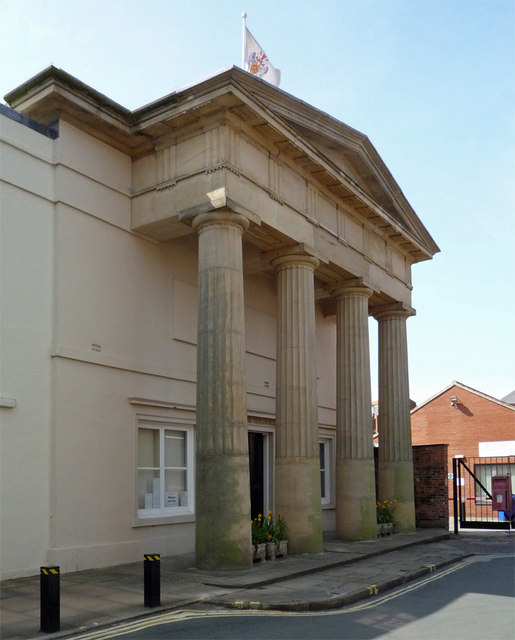
Beverley Guildhall

After the Norman Conquest, many pilgrims flocked to Beverley upon hearing reports of miracles wrought by the town's founder, John. However, much of the North of England rejected Norman rule, and sought to reinstate Anglo-Saxon rule. Towns in Yorkshire were obliterated by the Normans in response, with the Harrying of the North; but Beverley itself was spared, upon the Normans hearing about the town's saintly history. In 1086, Beverley was recorded in the Domesday Book as comprising around 19 households and lying within the Hundred of Sneculfcros. In the 12th century, Beverley developed from a settlement of several thousand, to an extensive town, stretching from around the North Bar area to the Beck in an elongated pattern, it was granted borough status in 1122 by Thurstan. Industry grew further, Beverley especially traded wool with the cloth making towns of the Low Countries.

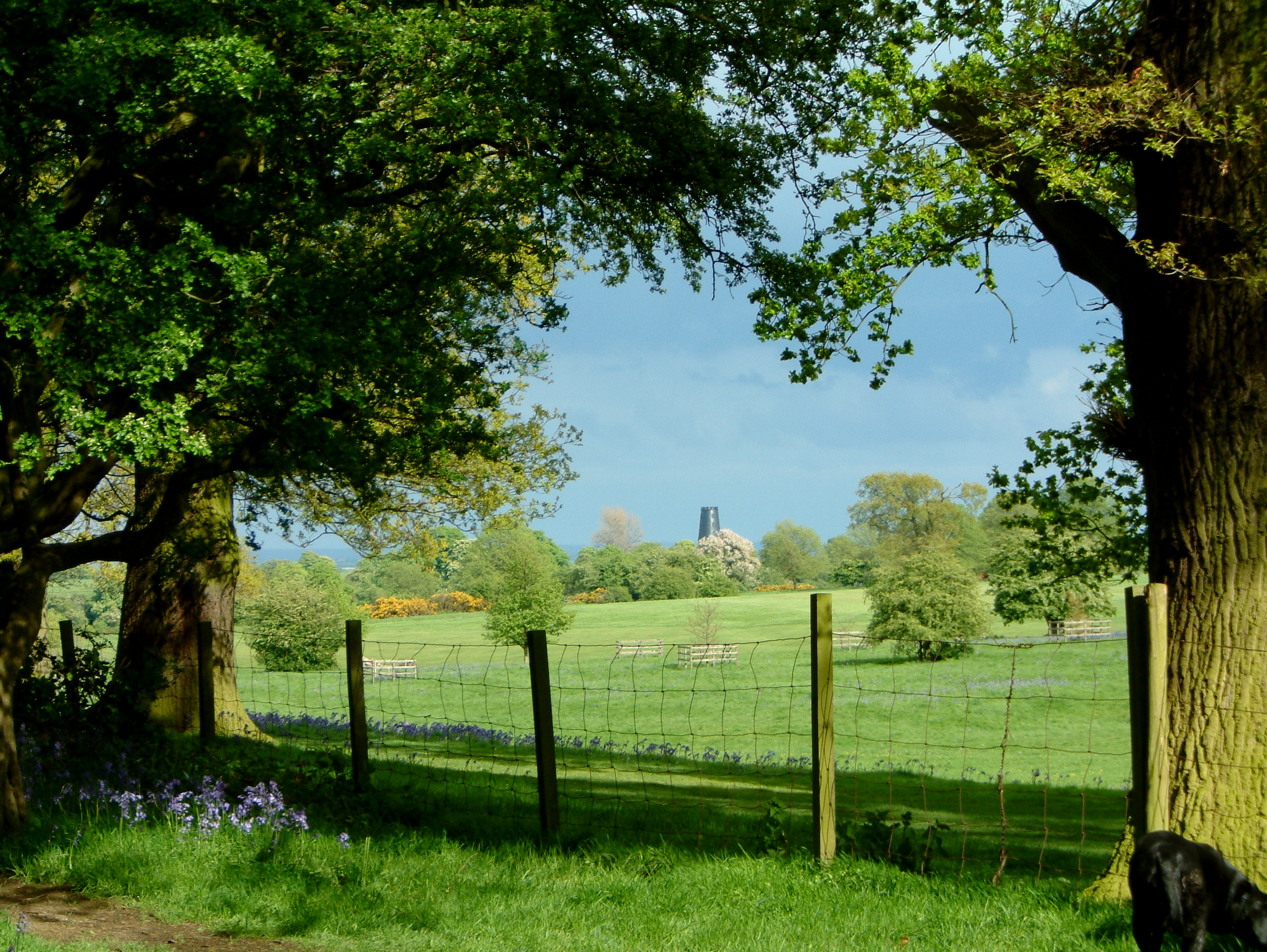
Westwood and the Black Mill

The town suffered a large fire in 1188 which destroyed numerous houses, and damaged Beverley Minster. Lady Sybil de Valines gave the Manor of the Holy Trinity on the east side of Beverley to the Knights Hospitallers in 1201, where they established a preceptory; also to be found in Beverley during the 13th century were Dominican friars who were given some land by Henry III upon which they erected buildings. Franciscans were present. A dispute arose between local farmers and the archbishop during the 13th century, about land rights; after the locals demanded a royal inquiry, the archbishop granted the townspeople pasture and pannage in the Westwood and other places.

During the 14th century, England experienced periods of famine caused by poor weather conditions which destroyed crops. There were other nationwide issues to contend with at the time, such as the Black Death, the Hundred Years' War and the Great Rising. However, Beverley continued to grow: and by 1377, had become the 10th largest town in England.

The earliest surviving secular drama in English, The Interlude of the Student and the Girl (c. 1300), may have originated from Beverley.

=== Reformation decline in Tudor times ===
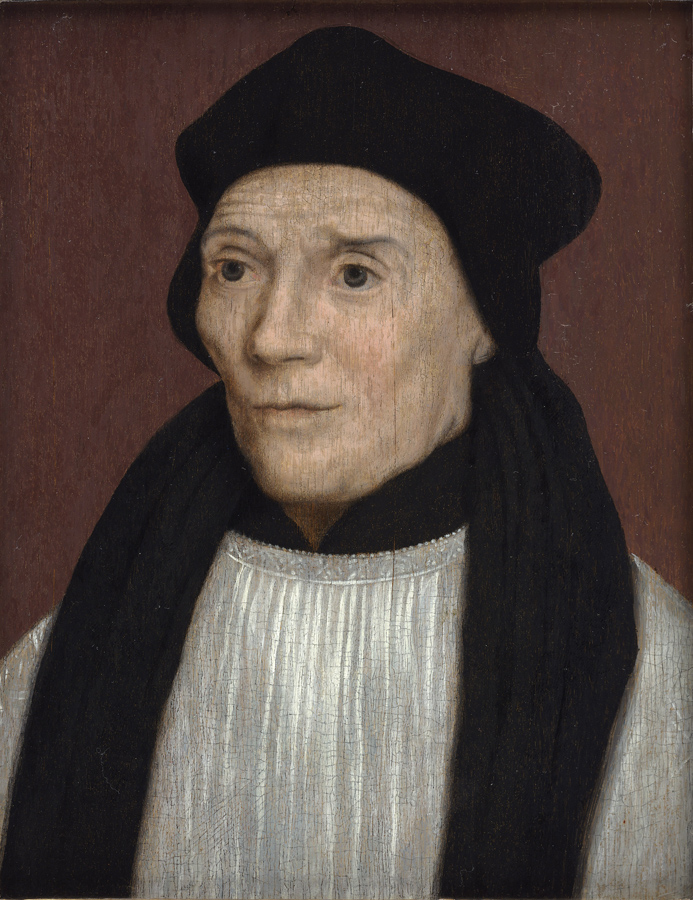
Local man Saint John Fisher was martyred in 1535

Beverley was reliant on pilgrimage, but changes brought about by the Reformation impacted upon this tradition, resulting in a decline in its status. Local Beverley man Cardinal John Fisher was martyred along with Thomas More for refusing to accept the Tudor King Henry VIII as Head of the Church of England. In October 1536, there was a popular rising in Beverley where 500 men in the town gathered at the Westwood under the leadership of a local lawyer named William Stapleton, later becoming part of the larger Pilgrimage of Grace in York and, in turn, part of the 30,000 rebels opposing Henry's new religious laws. Henry followed through with the break from Rome and the Dissolution of the Monasteries, dissolving the Dominican Friary in Beverley and taking their land for himself, the Knights Templars in Beverley suffered the same fate in 1540.

As a result of the tensions across the North of England, governance duties were handed over to the Council of the North so the Tudors could control the area at arm's length. Beverley was visited by John Leland, the man known as the "father of English local history", he wrote of the town in some detail, estimating the population of the time at around 5,000. Beverley Minster was threatened with demolition by its new owners who wanted to profit from selling its stone and lead, however the local people led by wealthy merchant Richard Gray saved it from this fate. During the time of Elizabeth I, Beverley was endowed with its own mayor; Edward Ellerker was the first to take this position. The gap between Beverley's rich and poor became more pronounced during the Tudor era, due to large unemployment. The substantial drop in pilgrimage to Beverley in honour of its founder John of Beverley affected the jobs of the working class as it was Beverley's main industry.

=== Civil war and Restoration recovery ===
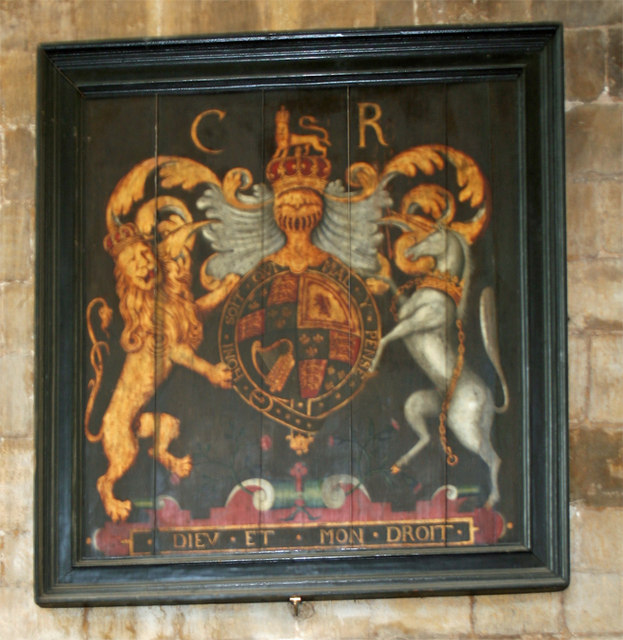
Charles II's arms hanging in Beverley Minster

In the early 17th century Beverley was affected by the plague which caused many deaths. Due to the close geographical proximity to Hull, focus on the area became magnified when the people of Hull refused to open the gates to Charles I a couple of months before the fighting began in the English Civil War. After being turned away from Hull, the king spent three weeks as a guest in a house at North Bar in Beverley, where he was openly greeted with the ringing of St Mary's Church bells. Beverley was initially royalist: however, it was taken by the parliamentarians of Hull, forcing the king to flee. A royalist army led by William Cavendish defeated Thomas Fairfax to reclaim the town for the royalists; from here they launched another Siege of Hull. Eventually the parliamentarians won the civil war and established the Commonwealth of England, in which alehouses were shut on Sundays and theatres and race meetings abandoned: the Puritans visited the then Church of England houses of worship and destroyed anything they thought to be idolatrous.

Beverley Minster managed to escape this fate, in part due to the prominence of the Percy family and the fact that the church housed memorials to their ancestors. Beverley's Quakers were not so fortunate, and were strongly repressed by the Puritans. The English Restoration with Charles II coming to power was generally well received in Beverley, and his royal coat of arms was hung in the Minster and remains there. In terms of trade Beverley was not rich in the 17th century but had improved slightly, the majority were based in agriculture. During the Georgian era, Beverley was the county town of the East Riding of Yorkshire and became the prime market town in the area during the 18th century; competition from Pocklington, Howden and Market Weighton was insufficient. The replacing of old timber buildings with new ones in the Georgian style helped the town recover in prestige, with the religious structures also undergoing restorations. During the Industrial Revolution, Beverley's people retained most agricultural jobs, though there was a presence of iron workers within the town.

=== Industrial revolution and military ===
The population of the borough and liberties of the town in 1841 was 8,671.

Hodgsons Tannery (1816–1979) was a major employer in the town. The tannery turned animal hides into leather. At the time of closure there were 750 redundancies. After Hodgsons closed, part of the factory site was used by Clairant (chemical production company). However, this had also closed by 2005 with the loss of 120 jobs. Another tannery Melrose Tanners, formerly Cussons, on Keldgate, closed in 1986.

Beverley had a cattle street-market for 1300 years, which was transferred into Beverley Mart in 1864. The mart served as the centre for the region's livestock trade until it closed. The site is now the car park for Tesco supermarket, which opened in 2002.

Armstrong Patents Co. Ltd. (1917–1995) was also a well known company and major employer. The factory on East Gate mainly produced Armstrong shock absorbers until it closed in 1981.

Beverley Shipyard opened in 1884 and continued to build ships until the yard closed completely in 1977. From 1905 until 1962 the yard was owned by Cook, Welton & Gemmell Shipbuilders. In 1954 the yard employed 650 people. Ships were launched sideways into the River Hull.

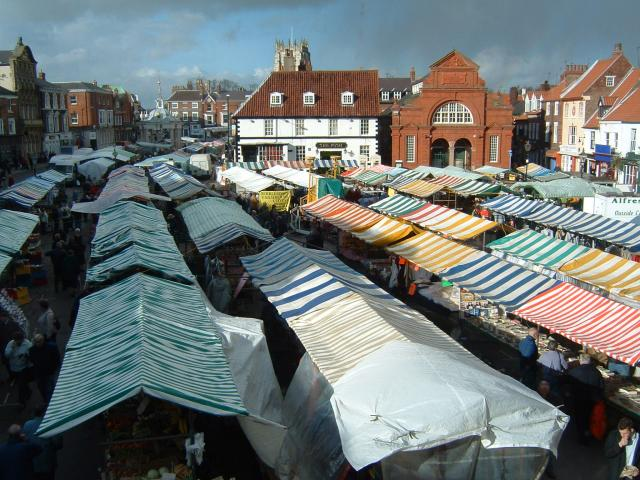
Beverley during a market day

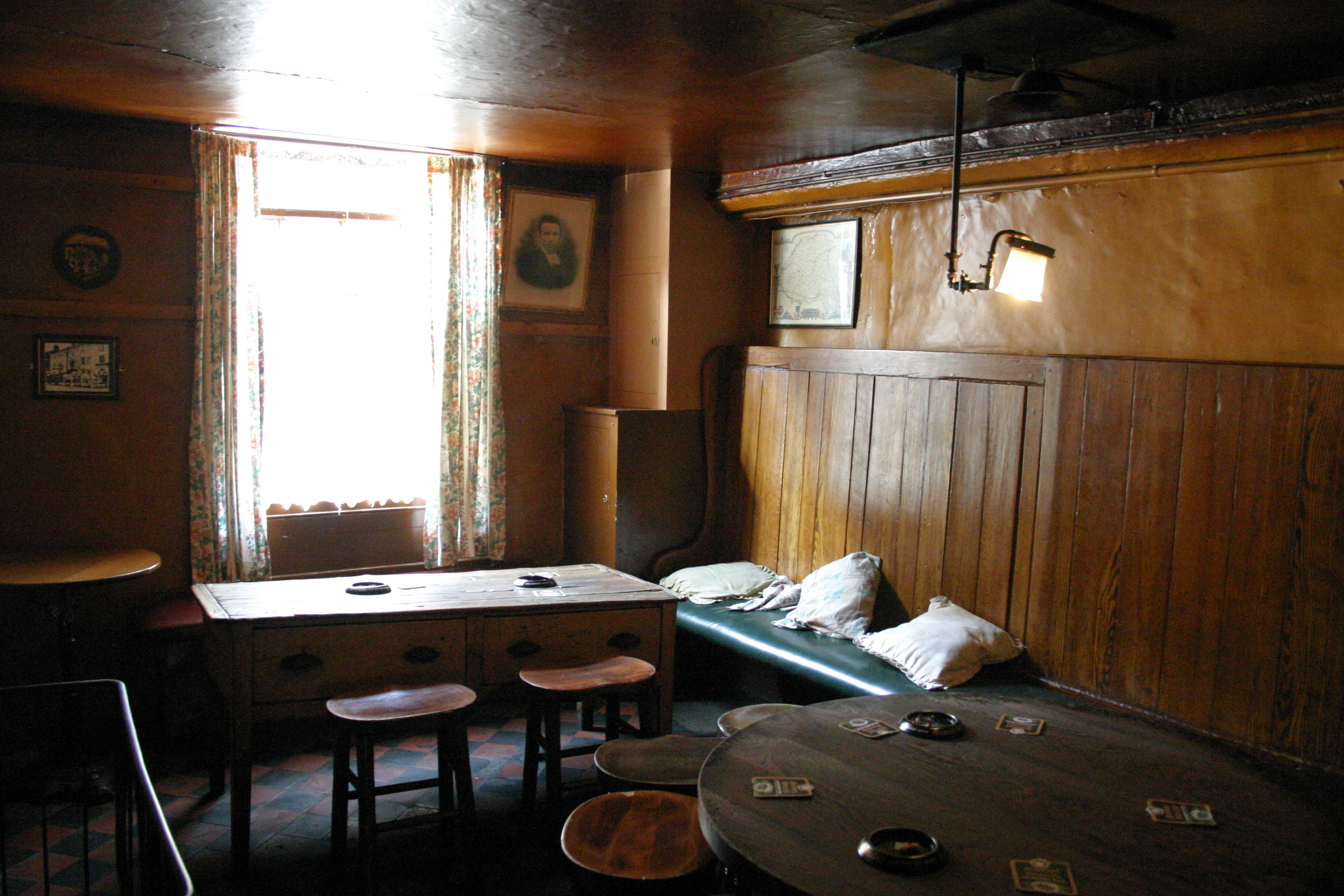
The White Horse Inn Hengate

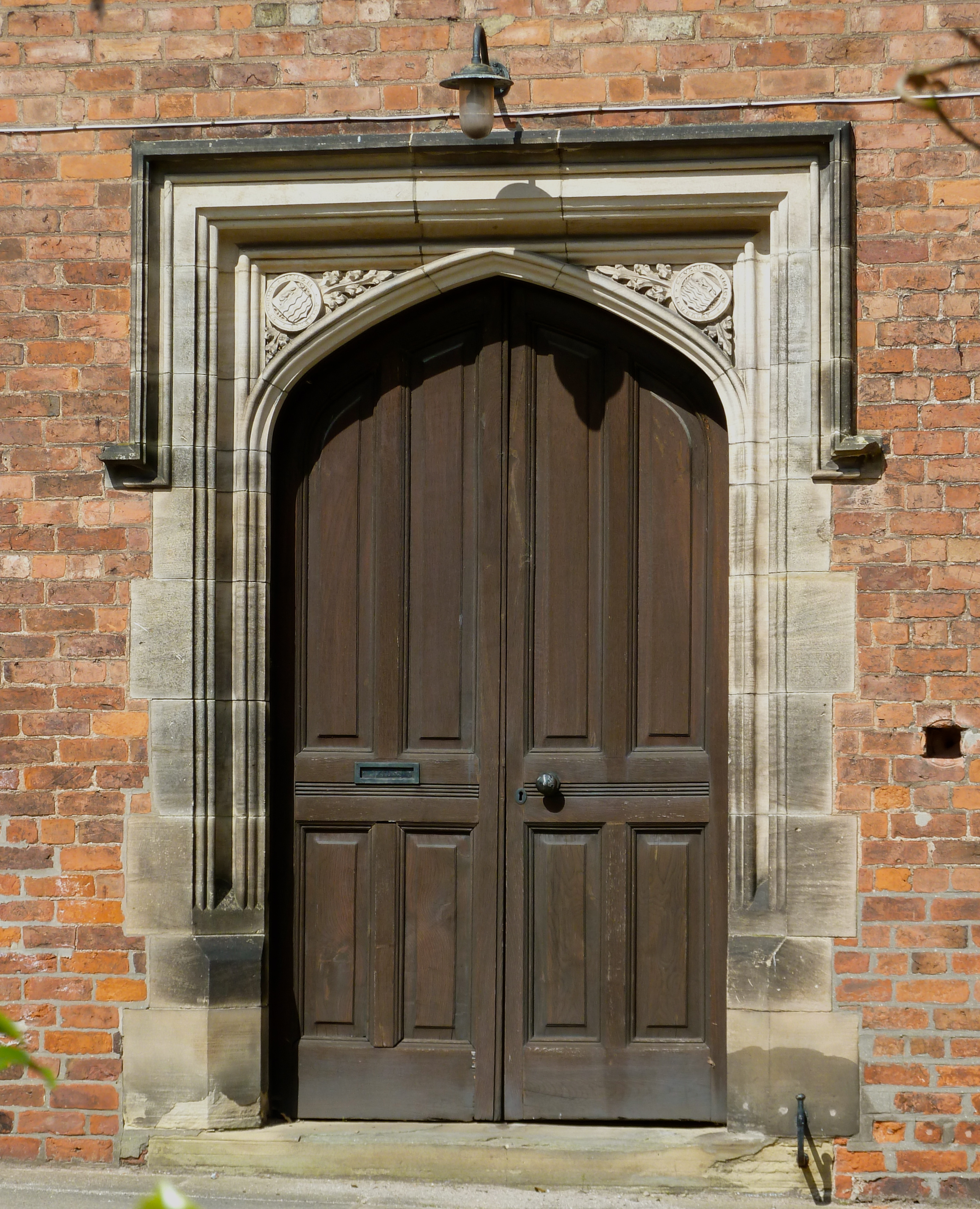
Westwood Hospital

Due to an increase in population, some of the entrances into the town (such as the brick-built Bars) were taken down to accommodate traffic. Although population figures rose steeply, the increase was not as much as in nearby Hull, or most of the rest of England. Beverley's religious associations remained during the 19th century: as well as the majority Anglican faith, there were several non-conformist religions practised such as Methodism with John Wesley previously having preached there; with the completion of the Catholic Emancipation and the refoundation of the Catholic hierarchy, the Diocese of Beverley in 1850 was chosen to cover Yorkshire, before being divided into two dioceses.

Communications were improved with the opening of Beverley railway station in October 1846. In 1884, Andrew Cochrane founded a shipyard at Grovehill on the River Hull. It was purchased by Cook, Welton & Gemmell in 1901. The yard was a leading builder of trawlers for the Hull deep-sea fishing fleet. In both world wars the yard built minesweepers for the Royal Navy. The deep-sea trawler Arctic Corsair now preserved in Hull was built there in 1960. The yard closed for ship construction in 1977 and the site is now used for boat repairs.

A permanent military presence was established in the town with the completion of Victoria Barracks in 1878. The barracks closed in 1977, and the only army presence in the area is now the Defence School of Transport at Normandy Barracks Leconfield, two miles to the north. In the First World War the Royal Flying Corps had an airfield on the Westwood. The site is now Beverley Racecourse

=== World Wars and modern ===
The Second World War saw the nearby city of Hull suffer significantly from aerial bombardment: however, Beverley was more fortunate and did not endure such heavy attacks. Since the war, Beverley has gone through some remodelling, and has grown in size. It attracts thousands of tourists each year who come to view the religious buildings and visit Beverley Racecourse.

In the 1960s, plans to redevelop Armstrong's Engineering Works for housing put the Dominican Beverley Friary at threat of demolition: the friary building was listed in 1965 and is now in use as a youth hostel. Housing was developed on the former works site in the 1980s on what is now Dominican Walk and its adjacent streets.

In 2007, Beverley was named as the best place to live in the United Kingdom in an "Affordable Affluence" study by the Royal Bank of Scotland.

In late 2015 a new shopping and entertainment complex opened in Flemingate (on the site of the old Hodgsons Tannery). Among the attractions is a six-screen cinema and a Premier Inn hotel. East Riding College (formerly Beverley College of Further Education) also relocated to Flemingate, after the previous site was sold for a housing development.

=== Landmarks ===
Beverley Market Cross

- Newbegin House – 1757
- Beverley Minster – 1420
- St Mary's Church – 1530
- North Bar – 1409
- The Guildhall – 15th century
- Beverley Friary – 1539
- Beverley Market Cross – 1714
- Beverley Memorial Hall – 1959
- Black Mill – 1803
- The Corn Exchange & Public Baths – 1885 (previously a cinema and second-hand shop, now a Browns department store)
- Sessions House – 1814 (now a spa)
- Lairgate Hall – 1750 (Owned by the Warton family 1802–1925, later used by Beverley Borough Council)
- Beverley Racecourse – 1767
- 11 Ladygate, Beverley – early medieval shop

== Climate ==
Climate data for DST Leconfield (1991–2020 normals)
Month	Jan	Feb	Mar	Apr	May	Jun	Jul	Aug	Sep	Oct	Nov	Dec	Year
Mean daily maximum °C (°F)	7.2 (45.0)	8.1 (46.6)	10.3 (50.5)	13.0 (55.4)	15.8 (60.4)	18.8 (65.8)	21.3 (70.3)	21.1 (70.0)	18.3 (64.9)	14.2 (57.6)	10.2 (50.4)	7.5 (45.5)	13.8 (56.8)
Mean daily minimum °C (°F)	1.6 (34.9)	1.6 (34.9)	2.8 (37.0)	4.2 (39.6)	6.8 (44.2)	9.7 (49.5)	11.8 (53.2)	11.9 (53.4)	10.0 (50.0)	7.4 (45.3)	4.2 (39.6)	1.9 (35.4)	6.2 (43.2)
Average rainfall mm (inches)	53.1 (2.09)	49.5 (1.95)	42.9 (1.69)	45.3 (1.78)	44.5 (1.75)	64.3 (2.53)	54.7 (2.15)	61.5 (2.42)	58.2 (2.29)	64.7 (2.55)	64.7 (2.55)	57.7 (2.27)	660.9 (26.02)
Average rainy days (≥ 1 mm)	11.9	10.6	9.4	9.4	9.0	9.9	9.4	9.9	9.4	11.0	12.5	11.5	124.0
Mean monthly sunshine hours	62.1	86.9	124.3	161.7	204.2	175.1	195.6	181.2	144.2	107.3	72.4	59.9	1,575
Source: Met Office

== Governance ==
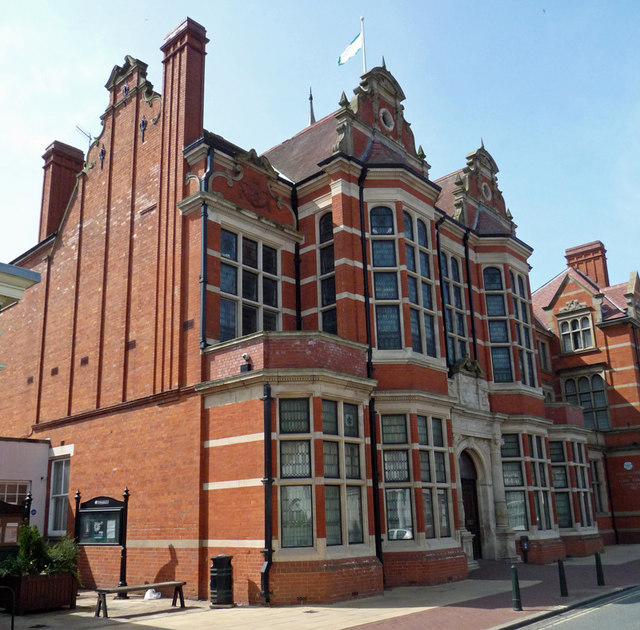
The county hall

During the Middle Ages, Beverley was governed by aldermen known as the twelve keepers, who oversaw the general running of the town and the maintaining of law and order. The borough corporation was reformed by the Municipal Corporations Act 1835 and formed the local government of the town until 1974. In 1974, following the Local Government Act 1972, the former area of Beverley borough was merged with Beverley Rural District and Haltemprice Urban District to form an enlarged Beverley borough in the county of Humberside. Since 1996, it has formed part of the East Riding of Yorkshire district and is the county town, as it was before 1974.

Beverley was represented in the Houses of Parliament by the Members of Parliament (MPs) for Yorkshire until Beverley was given parliamentary borough status from 1563. Beverley was able to elect two MPs for its entire time as a parliamentary borough; the right of election was vested not in the population as a whole, but in the freemen. Elections became notoriously corrupt, to the extent that the constituency was abolished in 1870 and incorporated into the East Riding constituency. During the 1950 general election a Beverley county constituency was created, covering half of the East Riding, with Bridlington covering the other half. It became part of the Haltemprice constituency in 1955, until it reverted to the Beverley constituency in 1983. Since 1997 Beverley has been part of the Beverley and Holderness constituency, a Conservative Party stronghold.

In 2019 the Liberal Democrats made huge gains in the local elections, taking out all of the Conservative seats and taking control of the Town Council, whilst also gaining two seats from the Conservatives on East Riding of Yorkshire Council in St Mary's Ward. The only Conservative representatives for Beverley are in Minster and Woodmansey Ward, where the Conservatives held all three seats.

Position	Current representatives
Member of Parliament	Graham Stuart, Conservative, elected 2005
East Riding of Yorkshire Council	ST MARY'S WARD Dave Boynton – Liberal Democrats, Denis Healy – Liberal Democrats; Linda Johnson – Liberal Democrats MINSTER AND WOODMANSEY WARD David Elvidge, Conservative, Kerri Harold, Conservative, Paul Nickersen, Independent,
Beverley Town Council	Peter Astell – Liberal Democrats, Tom Astell – Liberal Democrats, Dave Boynton – Liberal Democrats, Ian Gow – Independent, Denis Healy – Liberal Democrats, Chloe Hopkins – Labour, David Horsley – Liberal Democrats, Duncan Jack – Independent, Linda Johnson – Liberal Democrats, Margaret Pinder – Labour, David Tucker – Liberal Democrats, Ann Willis – Labour, Clare Wildey – Labour

== Planned expansion ==
In 2014 local authorities planned to build 3,300 new houses in Beverley, which would increase the size of the town by 20%. A spokesperson for East Riding of Yorkshire Council said: "The evidence recognises that the East Riding is generally a high demand area with strong levels of in-migration". The plans are opposed by some residents, such as those in the North Beverley Action Group.

== Education ==
Beverley is home to the oldest state school in England, in the form of Beverley Grammar School. The school was founded in 700 AD by Saint John of Beverley. Several notable alumni have attended the school, including chemist Smithson Tennant, who discovered iridium and osmium, Thomas Percy, who was involved in the Gunpowder Plot and Paul Robinson, a football goalkeeper who has represented England national football team (2003–2009). In the modern day the school hosts around 800 pupils and has received favourable reports from Ofsted, however, in 2013 it was determined as requiring improvement.

There are other schools in Beverley, such as Beverley High School, which is a comprehensive school for girls founded in 1908. It has around 850 pupils, and is well above the national average based on the results of GCSE test performances. Beverley Grammar School and Beverley High School share a common sixth form, called the Beverley Joint Sixth. In 2021 the school was rated as "Outstanding” by Ofsted, and "Outstanding" in every category including 6th form.

Longcroft School is a co-educational school, with around 1,500 pupils consisting of both boys and girls. Longcroft School was founded in 1949 and officially opened in 1951 and is home to the Longcroft Gospel Choir, founded by Jonathan Chapman. The choir comprises pupils from Year 9 and above and several members of Longcroft School staff, and has a large repertoire of music. Over the choir's period of existence, the choir has performed at venues such as Disneyland Paris and the Apple Store on Oxford Street, London, have released two of their own albums and have featured on a track by singer-songwriter Henry Priestman. But more recently in May 2015, it was announced that the Longcroft Gospel Choir will be one of twenty choirs in the UK to perform at and open the 2015 Rugby World Cup in London performing for the home team (England).

East Riding College has a campus in Beverley. The college offers various further education courses for school leavers and adults from the town.

== Media ==
Beverley and the East Riding of Yorkshire region is served by the East Riding Mail, which is the sister paper to the Hull Daily Mail. The Beverley Guardian was printed for 160 years, but it ceased in September 2016.

Beverley has two independent hyper-local magazines, Just Beverley and HU17.net.

Radio stations BBC Radio Humberside, Hits Radio East Yorkshire & North Lincolnshire and Nation Radio East Yorkshire serve the town and the whole of the East Riding of Yorkshire but, are based in the nearby city of Hull.

Local TV coverage is provided by BBC Yorkshire and Lincolnshire and ITV Yorkshire. Television signals are received from the Belmont TV transmitter.

Kingstown Hospital Radio serves the East Riding Community Hospital, in addition to the Hull Royal Infirmary and Castle Hill Hospital in nearby Cottingham.

Beverley has its own radio station 107.8 Beverley FM, which broadcasts to Beverley and its surrounding area from the studio based in the town.

The exterior scenes in Lease of Life, (with Robert Donat), in 1954, were filmed in Beverley and nearby Lund, East Riding of Yorkshire, (Hinton St John), as well as Beverley Minster.

== Religion ==
St Mary's Church

Beverley's largest religious denomination is Christianity; 79.9% of the people in the area polled as part of the United Kingdom Census 2001 professed the Christian faith, 8% above the national average. Beverley Minster contains a tomb said to contain the bones of Saint John of Beverley who founded a monastery here and with it the town; another saint from Beverley is Saint John Fisher (born c. 1469). The minster was designated a Grade I listed building in 1950 and is now recorded in the National Heritage List for England, maintained by Historic England.

Beverley Minster

Adherents of the Church of England are in the majority with three parishes; the ancient Beverley Minster, St Mary's Church (designated a Grade I listed building in 1950 and is now recorded in the National Heritage List for England, maintained by Historic England) and St Nicholas' Church. Beverley is a suffragan bishopric of the Diocese of York represented by the Bishop of Beverley, created in 1994 to provide a provincial episcopal visitor for the Province of York. There is one Roman Catholic church in Beverley called St John's which belongs to the Diocese of Middlesbrough; when the Catholic Emancipation was complete in 1850 the Diocese of Beverley was established to cover all of Yorkshire, but it was later broken up into two dioceses, Leeds and Middlesbrough. Methodism is represented in Beverley with around three places of worship. Latimer Congregational Church, in the east of Beverley, is affiliated to the Evangelical Fellowship of Congregational Churches.

Since their suppression in the 17th century, Quakers established a meeting house and have worshipped in Beverley ever since. Their present meeting house – the third – in Quaker Lane – was built in 1961.

Missionaries of the Church of Jesus Christ of Latter-day Saints from the United States first arrived in Beverley in 1850 and quickly established a local congregation. In 1963 a large new chapel on Manor Road was built by local church members. Due to the continued growth of the Beverley congregation both the building and car parks were enlarged in the late 1990s.

== Culture and amenities ==
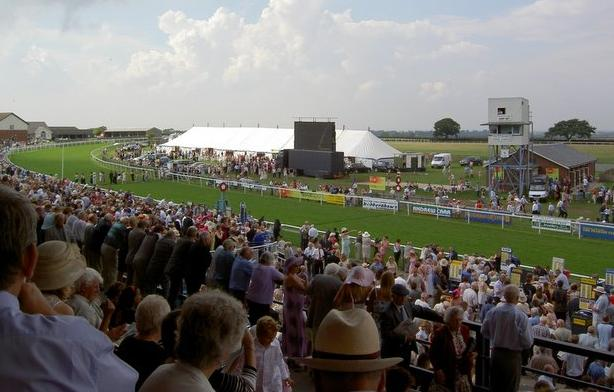
Beverley Racecourse

A market day is central to culture in Beverley; a smaller market day is held on Wednesday: however, the main event is on Saturday, with all of the stalls. Throughout each year there are various annual music festivals in the town, catering for different kinds of music. These include the Early Music Festival in May; the Beverley Folk Festival in June, which features three days of folk music, comedy and workshops; the Jazz Festival in August, followed by the Chamber Music Festival in September. Held monthly at the Beverley Memorial Hall is a local music event Sunday Live. It is also home to the popular Beverley Male Voice Choir.

Beverley hosts an annual literature festival, kite festival, a biennial puppet festival and Beverley town fair. Since 2006, Beverley Town Council has run an annual food festival in October. Including 70 stalls selling food produced in Beverley and the East Riding of Yorkshire, a 200-seat food theatre marquee, cookery demonstrations from local chefs, and street entertainment, the day-long event is attended by thousands of residents and visitors. In 2012, St Mary's Church in Beverley hosted the first real ale and cider festival. Over 2,000 people attended the event. The festival has now moved to the Beverley Memorial Hall and still attracts over 2,500 people.

In terms of sport, the most noted field of participation is horse racing with Beverley Racecourse. The sport has a long history in Beverley, with evidence of a permanent race track reaching back as far as 1690, while its first grandstand was built in 1767. The town is represented in football by Beverley Town F.C., who currently play in the Northern Counties East League Premier Division, the 9th tier of English football. Beverley was the host for the 2006 British National Cycling Championships. Beverley Westwood is home to the oldest golf club in Yorkshire the Beverley and East Riding Golf Club founded in October 1889. Beverley RUFC plays in the Yorkshire 1 league for Rugby Union and play at Beaver Park in the town. The Tour de Yorkshire passes through North Bar, one of the ancient gates of Beverley. A weekly 5k parkrun is held at the Westwood at 9:00am every Saturday.

Beverley town has a variety of public houses, some of which have become tourist attractions. Examples include The Sun Inn, the town's oldest public house dating back to around 1530. There are over 40 public houses in Beverley – the vast majority have been there for over a century. Beverley is home to one of the last pubs in the world to still use authentic gas lighting; The White Horse Inn (or "Nellie's" to the local population) is owned by the Samuel Smith Old Brewery company.

A purpose-built Post Office opened in Register Square in 1905. It continued to be the town's Post Office, until being closed in early 2020 as part of a cost cutting exercise. Post Office services are now provided by the nearby TGJones shop.

Beverley's first cinema, the Marble Arch, opened in 1916, located on Butcher Row. It was closed and completely demolished by 1967 having in the last few years been used as a bingo hall. After demolition, the site was used as a supermarket. Originally it was known as Moores, but later it became Prestos, then Jacksons. It is now M&S Food.

The Museum of Army Transport relocated from Leconfield to Beverley in 1983. The museum was housed on part of the former Hodgsons Tannery site. The last surviving Blackburn Beverley aircraft XB259 (named after the town, and built nearby in Brough) was on static display until the museum closed due to a funding shortfall in 2003. This and the neighbouring former Hodgsons Tannery is now occupied by Flemingate – a shopping centre including Dunelm, H&M, Sports Direct, restaurants and cafes, and is also home to a Parkway Cinema and Premier Inn.

The current fire station opened in 1982 when New Walkergate (road) was constructed. The much smaller old fire station is now a GP surgery. The police station on Norfolk Street is part of the court complex built in about 1805, including a sessions house and a prison. The former courthouse is now a spa and the octagonal prison is a private home.

Beverley previously had two hospitals serving the town. The Westwood Hospital originally opened as the town's Union Workhouse in 1861, but became a hospital in 1939 at the outbreak of World War II. The maternity ward closed in 1997. The hospital closed completely in 2011. The original main building has been converted to apartments. Beverley Cottage Hospital opened in Morton Lane 1885 and had closed by 1996. Beverley Community Hospital opened in 2012 on a new site.

The East Riding Theatre, housed in a former nonconformist chapel originally built in 1910, is a community initiative launched by a group of local volunteers and film and television actor Vincent Regan. First opened to the public in December 2014 and seating 200, it is run as a not-for profit organisation and a registered charity and presents regular drama productions and musical performances.

The Beverley Treasure House contains a library, archives, a museum, and an art gallery.

=== Town fair ===
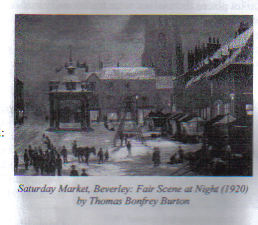
Saturday Market, Beverley. Fair Scene at Night (1920) Thomas Bonfrey Burton

Beverley has had a fair since medieval times. In the early days the fairs were places for trading goods and animals, and were useful for meeting people and finding news of what was happening elsewhere in the country. Towns were given the right to hold fairs by Royal charter. In the early 12th century Archbishop Thurstan was granted a charter to hold fairs four times a year, each lasting up to five days. Beverley's medieval fairs were:

- Feast of St John of Beverley (7 May)
- Ascension Day (Early summer)
- Feast of St John the Baptist (21–5 June)
- Translation of St John of Beverley (25 October)

The four annual fairs survived until the 20th century, although the dates changed over the years. All these fairs were for the sale of cattle and horses and were held on North Bar Within or Without. One of the two market places, Saturday Market or Wednesday Market, was used at the same time for selling general goods. Another trading area was at Highgate where goods not generally sold on the weekly markets were available, attracting ‘foreigners’ or people from other areas such as York. The great horse fair was on Ascension Day-eve (the Cross Fair). A toll was charged for a horse entering the town and another if it was sold.

By the 20th century, the sale of livestock at fairs had dwindled. In 1928, sheep and cattle were only sold on the Ringing Day fair. The pleasure part of the fair, however, had gained great popularity. These funfairs were held on Saturday Market. As the fairground equipment became larger and heavier and the use of the motor vehicle became more widespread, Saturday Market place was no longer suitable for the purpose.

On 8 September 1958, Minute 581 of the Beverley Town Council states: “It was noted that the agreement between BTC and John Farrar and Joseph Shaw to hold four fairs a year on the Market Place expired after Midsummer Fair 1959”. On 27 October (Minute 694), “It was resolved that the fair should be removed from the Market Place.” On 7 September 1959, the Town Clerk reported that Mr John Farrar and Joseph Shaw had accepted terms offered for use of space for the four fairs commencing with the October fair. The fair was held four times a year on Morton Lane car park, which also housed the Town’s coach park. In 2002, the East Riding of Yorkshire Council, against the wishes of a large number of the residents sold the Morton Lane car park to Tesco, leaving the Town with nowhere to hold the fair. The council offered space on the Westwood to hold the fair but the organisers together with the solicitors of The Showmen’s Guild demanded that they were allocated a site ‘within the walls of Beverley’ stating that the Royal Charter gave them that right.

In 2003, the Beverley Town Fair was, once again sited in the centre of the town on Saturday Market. The fair is now limited to one week a year starting on August Bank Holiday Sunday.

== Transport ==
Beverley railway station

The town is served by Beverley railway station on the Hull–Scarborough line, with services currently run by Northern and a limited service between Beverley and London King's Cross provided by Hull Trains. Before the mid-1960s, there was a direct York–Beverley line via Market Weighton; the Minsters Rail Campaign is seeking to reinstate the closed line. The Line was a successful bid in the Restoring your Railways fund before the fund was scrapped.

Beverley railway station was opened in October 1846 by the York and North Midland Railway and gained junction status nineteen years later when the North Eastern Railway opened its line to Market Weighton and York. The railway station, designed by George Townsend Andrews, is now a Grade II listed building and has an elegant overall roof.

The five-mile (8 km) £13 million A1079 Beverley Bypass opened in May 1980; the road links York and Hull. East Yorkshire Motor Services provide internal town services, regular bus links with Hull city centre, as well as to local surrounding villages and places such as Hessle, Pocklington, Driffield, Market Weighton, Bridlington, York and Scarborough. The town has its own bus station. Beverley Beck is a canal which gives boats access to the town from the River Hull. The beck is used by fishermen for catching a large variety of fish such as pike, bream and carp. Previously, the Beverley Beck used to form a more significant role in transport as part of the trade industry, where Beverley was a trading post of the Hanseatic League. It remains home to the Beverley Barge Preservation Society in the modern day. Beverley is home to the notorious Grovehill junction which has 42 traffic lights.

== Literature ==
Beverley is the main setting for Domini Highsmith's Father Simeon trilogy: Keeper at the Shrine (1994), Guardian at the Gate (1995) and Master of the Keys (1996).

== Notable people ==
- Julian Agyeman (born 1958), academic
- Jane Arden (1758–1840), schoolmistress and grammarian
- Ken Annakin (1914–2009), film director
- Lewis Bean (born 1992), rugby player
- William Binnington Boyce (1804–1889), philologist, clergyman
- Sam Cosgrove (born 1996), footballer
- Lindsey Chapman (born 1984), actress and TV and radio presenter
- Joseph Clay, United States Continental Congressman
- George Collison (1772–1847), academic, theologian
- James Robert Craig (born 1988), rugby player
- William Dixon (1808–1887), U.S. politician
- Frederick William Elwell (1870–1958), artist
- John Fisher (1469–1535), bishop, cardinal, saint, martyr
- Peter Goy (born 1938), footballer
- Anthony Hedges (1931–2019), composer
- Alfred Hutton (1839–1910), Victorian officer, antiquarian and swordsman
- Gerry Ingram (born 1947), footballer
- Andrea Jenkyns (born 1974), Member of Parliament Morley and Outwood
- Lisa Kay (born 1971), actress
- Jemma McKenzie-Brown (born 1994), Tiara Gold High School Musical 3: Senior Year
- Jack Marriott (born 1994), footballer
- Anna Maxwell Martin (born 1978), actress
- Joan of Leeds, 14th century runaway nun
- John Merbecke (1510–1585), theologian, musician
- Katie O'Brien (born 1986), tennis player
- Julia Pardoe (1806–1862), poet, novelist, historian
- Thomas Percy (1560–1605), gunpowder plotter
- Dave Phillips (born 1987), Great Britain men's national ice hockey team, Lake Erie Monsters (AHL)
- Paul Robinson (born 1979), footballer
- Suhayl Saadi (born 1961), writer
- Mike Score (born 1957), keyboardist, singer
- Calum Scott (born 1988), singer and songwriter
- Lizzie Simmonds (born 1991), swimmer
- Guy Smith (born 1974), 2003 24 Hours of Le Mans winner
- Neil Thompson (born 1963), footballer
- Eleanor Tomlinson (born 1992), actress
- Mary Wollstonecraft (1759–1797), writer and philosopher, lived in Beverley 1768–1774
- Curtis Woodhouse (born 1980), former professional footballer and boxer, and now the current manager of Tadcaster Albion
- Danny Worsnop (born 1990), vocalist of We Are Harlot and Asking Alexandria

== Twin towns ==
Beverley is twinned with:

- Nogent-sur-Oise, Oise, France
- Lemgo, Lippe, Germany
