= Green Dragon =

Green Dragon may refer to:

== Chinese religion ==
- Azure Dragon, also known as Green Dragon, one of the Dragon Kings of the Four Seas

== Consumer products ==
- Green dragon (tincture), a tincture derived from Cannabis

== Buildings ==
- Green Dragon, Beverley, a pub in the East Riding of Yorkshire, England
- The Green Dragon, Flaunden, a public house in Hertfordshire, England
- The Green Dragon, Monmouth, a public house and inn located in St Thomas Square Monmouth, Wales
- Green Dragon Tavern, a meeting place during the era of the American Revolution in Boston, Massachusetts

== Film ==
- Green Dragon (film), a 2001 film by Timothy Linh Bui

== Games ==
- Green dragon (Dungeons & Dragons), a monster from the game Dungeons & Dragons
- A mahjong tile with a green Chinese character that loosely means "to strike it rich" (發) on it

== Literature ==
- "The Green Serpent", a fairy tale
- The Green Dragon, an inn in The Shire from J. R. R. Tolkien's Middle-earth writings
- At the Green Dragon, a.k.a. The Green Dragon, a novel by Joseph Jefferson Farjeon

== Plants ==
- Green dragon, the common name of several plants in the family Araceae, including:
  - the North American species Arisaema dracontium
  - the Asian genus Pinellia
- Green dragon, another name for the pitaya or dragon fruit

== Ships ==
- USS Green Dragon (SP-742), a United States Navy patrol boat commissioned in 1917 which saw service during World War I

== Songs ==
- "The Green Dragon", a song from the soundtrack album and film Dogs in Space, performed by Michael Hutchence

== Sailing ==
- Green Dragon Racing Team, the joint Chinese-Irish entry in the 2008–2009 Volvo Ocean Race

== UAV ==
- IAI Green Dragon, an loitering munition developed by the Israel Aerospace Industries

== Other ==
- "Green Dragon," a nickname for the rocket fuel pentaborane
- Green Dragon (Lake Compounce), a wooden roller coaster located at Lake Compounce in Bristol, Connecticut
- The Green Dragon Crescent Blade, a legendary guandao said to have been wielded by Guan Yu
- The Peerless Green Dragon, a race car
- Green Dragon (order), a mystical Tibetan or Japanese occult order
