= The Corner House =

The Corner House may refer to:

- The Cornerhouse, Beverley, a pub in England
- The Cornerhouse, Nottingham, a leisure complex in the UK
- Cornerhouse, Manchester, a cinema and contemporary visual arts centre in the UK
- Corner House (Johannesburg), a historic building in South Africa
- The Corner House (organisation), a not for profit organisation supporting democratic and community movements for environmental and social justice in the U.K.
- Corner House (Riga), the headquarters of the Soviet KGB in Latvia
- A house located in a Road intersection
