= Walkergate House =

Historic building in Beverley, England

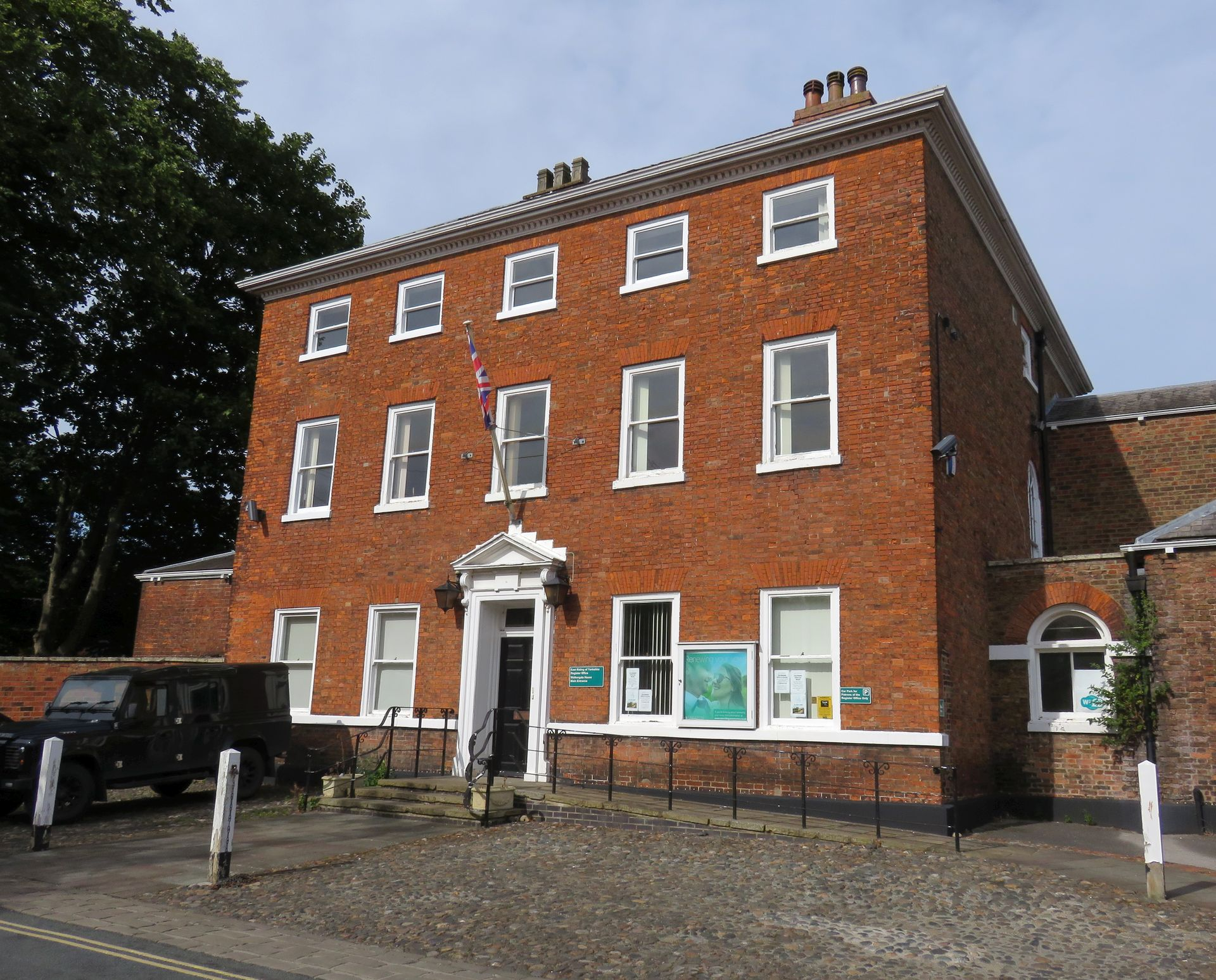
The building, in 2025

Walkergate House is a historic building in Beverley, a town in the East Riding of Yorkshire, in England.

The house was built around 1775, probably to a design by William Middleton. The design of the house has similarities with the earlier Norwood House. Walkergate House was occupied by Alexander Fielding Boyd and his wife Louisa Boyd, née Ragueneau. Alexander died on 31 May 1894, and the house passed to his widow Louisa. Louisa Boyd, known as Mrs Alexander Fielding Boyd, owned the house from 1894 until her death, aged 85, on 3/2/1910. In her will, she left the house to charity as a home for gentlewomen. In 1924, it was converted into an almshouse, but it was requisitioned in 1941 and later passed to the local council, which used it as a register office. In 2025, it was sold by the East Riding of Yorkshire Council. The building has been grade II listed since 1950.

The house is built of red brick on a stone plinth, with a sill band, a painted ogee bracketed eaves cornice, and a tile roof. It has three storeys and is five bays wide. Steps with iron rails lead up to the central doorway that has an architrave, chambranles, a fanlight, a frieze with a central tablet, decorated consoles, and a dentilled pediment. The windows are sashes with flat brick gauged arches. Inside, the drawing room is decorated in the style of Robert Adam.

== See also ==
- Listed buildings in Beverley (central and northeast areas)
