= 11 Ladygate =

Historic building in Beverley, East Riding of Yorkshire, England

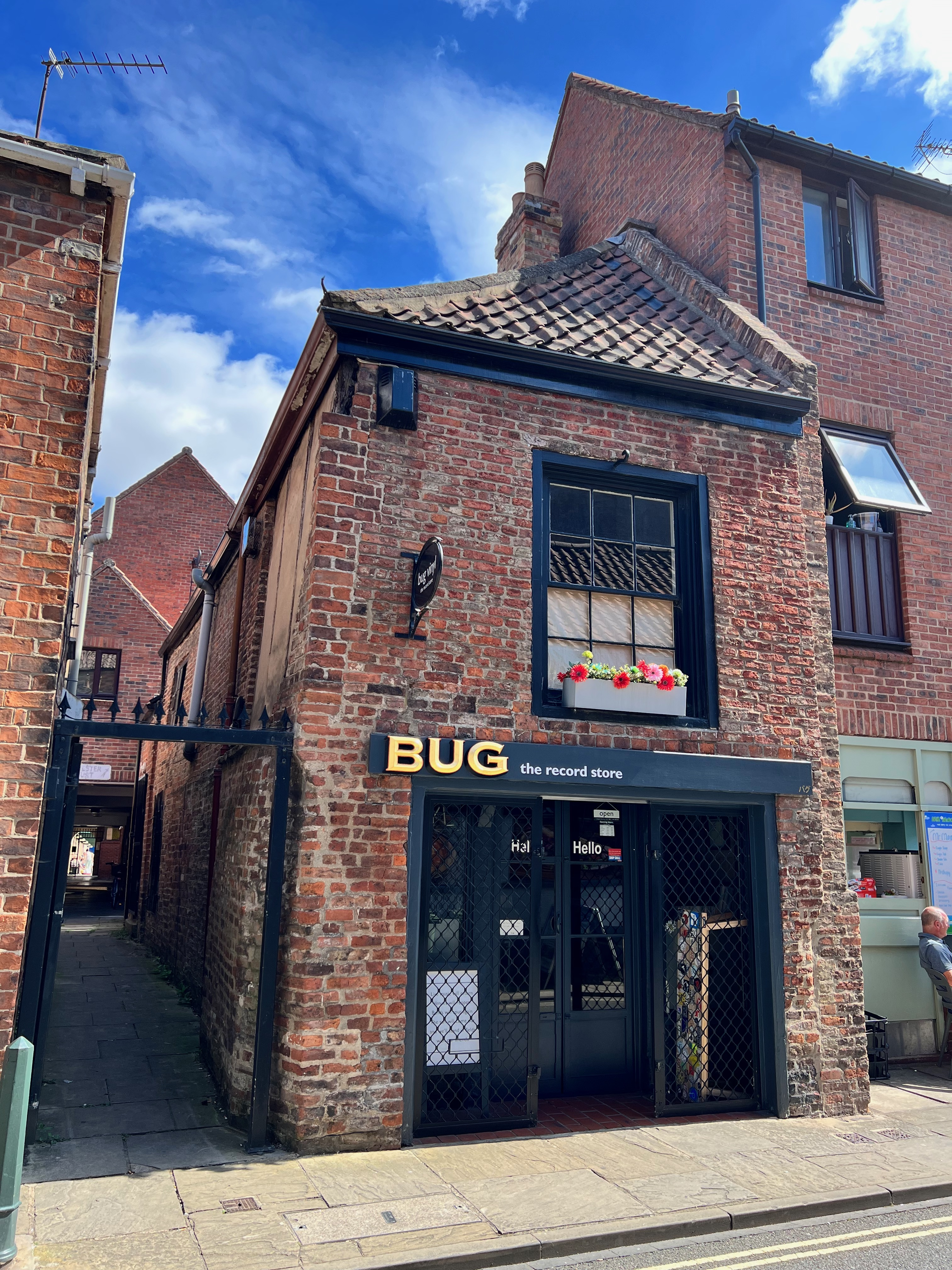
- Medieval Timber-Framed Shop
- Interactive map of 11 Ladygate
- 53°50′38″N 0°25′57″W
- Location: Beverley, East Riding of Yorkshire, England
- OS grid reference: TA 03223 39755

History
- Built: 17th century

Listed Building – Grade II
- Designated: 15 April 1980

11 Ladygate is located close to the market place and centre of the historic town of Beverley, East Riding of Yorkshire, England. This unassuming building represents what would have been normal and common in the middle ages when the town prospered from the wool trade.The street has another later timber-framed building of at 19-21 Ladygate which dates from the 16th or 17th century. The street, which runs the full length of the market place, predominantly consists of later 18th and 19th century dwellings and businesses.

This 17th-century building is constructed from timber-frames, brick and a clay pan-tile roof. The limited 13 feet width of the property was determined by the beam of the Hanse cogs bringing timber from Scandinavia and Poland into the docks probably at Hull or Beverley Beck. This two storey shop had a loading bay above the shop front and a wooden staircase at the rear. The timber framing can be seen along the passageway to the left of the building.

The shop keeper would have lived above the business and as the property would have been let as just the walls and floor, the tenants would have taken the staircase with them when the lease ended. This building's timber framing has been dated by taking a core of wood from its wood. The sample would be then examined under a lower power microscope to compare the width and number of tree-rings to that of a known date. This is known as Dendrochronology the scientific method of dating using the annual nature of tree growth. The building is listed as Grade II.

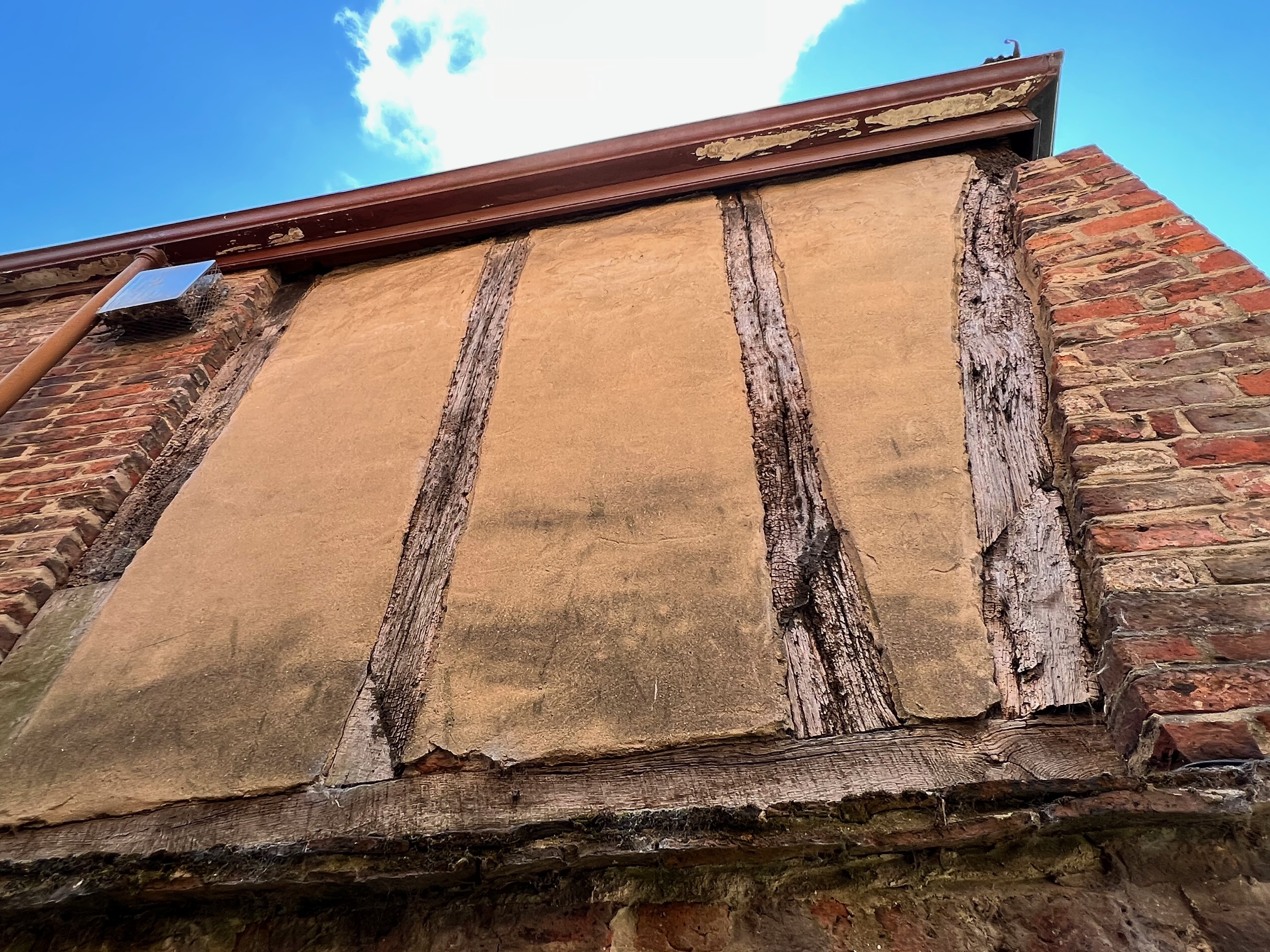
Timber frame of the building which historically would have been filled with Wattle and daub

== See also ==
- Listed buildings in Beverley (central and northeast areas)
