= Listed buildings in Beverley (central and northeast areas) =

Beverley is a civil parish in the county of the East Riding of Yorkshire, England. It contains about 450 listed buildings that are recorded in the National Heritage List for England. Of these, eight are listed at Grade I, the highest of the three grades, 31 are at Grade II*, the middle grade, and the others are at Grade II, the lowest grade. The parish contains the market town of Beverley and the surrounding region. This list contains the listed buildings in the areas described by Pevsner and Neave as the centre and northeast areas, which include Saturday Market, Wednesday Market, Ladygate, Hengate, Norwood, Walkergate, Butcher Row and the adjacent streets. These areas form the commercial centre of the town, containing the two markets, and most of the listed buildings are shops, offices, and houses, cottages and associated structures. The others include public houses, a market cross, a hotel, former almshouses, lamp standards, a bank, a school and a former corn exchange.

== Key ==
Grade	Criteria
I	Buildings of exceptional interest, sometimes considered to be internationally important
II*	Particularly important buildings of more than special interest
II	Buildings of national importance and special interest

== Buildings ==
Name and location	Photograph	Date	Notes	Grade
White Horse Hotel and shop 53.84452°N 0.43196°W		Medieval	The public house and shop have a timber framed core, and were enclosed in brick in the late 17th century. The building has a tile roof and two storeys. The main doorway to the public house has decorated pilasters, shaped consoles and a shelf cornice, above which is the figure of a horse carved in wood and supported on brackets. The public house has eight bays, and a mix of sash and casement windows, those on the ground floor with segmental heads. The shop on the corner to the left has two bays, and contains shopfronts,and a yard entry. Inside the public house are late 19th-century fixtures and fittings.	II*
11 Ladygate; 53.84378°N 0.43269°W		Late medieval	The building has a timber framed core, it is partly clad in brick, and has a hipped pantile roof. There are two storeys and one bay. The ground floor contains a shopfront, and on the upper floor is a recessed sash window. There is exposed timber framing on the left return and inside the building.	II
55 and 56 Saturday Market; 53.84260°N 0.43246°W	—	16th century	The shop has a timber framed core, its exterior is roughcast and painted, and it has a coped parapet and a pantile roof. There are two storeys and attics, and three bays. On the ground floor are two shopfronts, one with a bowed front, and the other dating from the 19th century. The upper floor has three sash windows, and on the roof are two gabled dormers with casements.	II
19 and 21 Ladygate; 53.84352°N 0.43232°W		16th to 17th century	The building is timber framed and was refronted in brick in about 1830. It has a pantile roof with overhanging eaves and two storeys. The left house has a plinth and two bays. The central doorway has panelled pilasters, a frieze and a cornice, and most of the windows are sashes in architraves. To the right is a full-height passage, and further to the right is a shop in painted brick with one bay. The doorway on the left has a rectangular fanlight, to the right is a shop window, both with segmental heads, and above is a sash window.	II
22 Butcher Row; 53.84151°N 0.42762°W		17th century	The building is in painted brick with a pantile roof. There are two storeys and two bays. On the ground floor is a modern shopfront, and the upper floor has sash windows with an iron sign bracket between.	II
29, 30 and 31 Saturday Market; 53.84283°N 0.43149°W		17th century or earlier	A row of three shops with a timber framed core, encased in brown brick, partly painted, with pantile roofs. The right two shops have two storeys, and the left shop also has an attic, and each shop has a shopfront on the ground floor. The left shop has a sash window on the upper floor and a gabled dormer above. The shopfront of the right shop has pilasters, a dentilled entablature and an entrance with a fanlight.	II
32–35 Saturday Market; 53.84275°N 0.43141°W		17th century or earlier	A row of three buildings with a timber framed core that were encased in brick in the 18th century. There are two storeys and six bays. The ground floor contains shopfronts, the left building has two bow windows with panelled stone bases, pilasters, reeded consoles and entablatures, and the shopfront of the middle building is canted. On the upper floor are four sash windows and two blocked windows.	II
51 Saturday Market; 53.84245°N 0.43226°W		17th century or earlier	The public house, which has a timber framed core, is roughcast, with applied timber framing and a steep pantile roof. There are two storeys and a front of one bay. On the front is a wide two-storey bay window, and a hanging sign with an ornamental iron bracket, and the entrance is through a passage on the left.	II
6 and 7 Wednesday Market; 53.84130°N 0.42647°W		17th century (probable)	A pair of shops with a timber framed core, they are refronted in red brick and have a pantile roof. There are two storeys and attics, and two bays. The central passageway is flanked by shopfronts. The upper floor contains two shallow splay canted bay windows, and on the roof are two sloped dormers with casements.	II
Ashelford; 53.84177°N 0.42790°W		17th century	The shop is in painted brick, with a parapet and a hipped tile roof. There are two storeys and an attic, and one bay. On the ground floor is a shopfront, the upper floor has a sash window, and above is a flat-roofed dormer. Inside, there is a 17th-century staircase.	II
6–14 Butcher Row; 53.84170°N 0.42811°W		Late 17th century	A row of shops that were refronted in about 1820. They are rendered, and have a moulded cornice, and roofs of slate and tile. There are two storeys and six bays. On the front are two doorways with attached columns, an entablature and a cornice, and the shopfronts and shop windows are modern. The upper floor contains sash windows, and there are three flat-headed roof dormers.	II*
7 and 9 Butcher Row; 53.84183°N 0.42808°W		Late 17th century	A pair of shops in painted brick, the ground floor rendered, with a moulded wood gutter on brick modillions, and a pantile roof. There are two storeys and five bays. The shopfronts and the upper floor windows are modern.	II
11 Butcher Row; 53.84181°N 0.42797°W		Late 17th century	The building is in red brick, with a sill band, bracketed eaves, and a pantile roof. There are two storeys and three bays. In the left bay is a round-arched doorway with panelled pilasters, a radial fanlight, voussoirs, and a keystone. The windows are sashes with rusticated lintels and keystones. At the rear are two gables, a modillion cornice and triple windows.	II
5 Ladygate; 53.84397°N 0.43295°W		Late 17th century	The front of the house is in 18th-century red brick on a stucco plinth, and it has a roof of tile at the front and pantile at the rear. There are two storeys and four bays. The doorway has an architrave, a decorated fanlight, decorated consoles, a frieze and a bracketed cornice, To the right is a bow window with a shallow cornice, and the other windows are sashes with painted stone heads.	II*
1 and 3 Norwood; 53.84549°N 0.43094°W		c. 1700	A house later divided into two, in red brick on a moulded stone base, with an eaves cornice, and a roof in asbestos tile on the left and pantile on the right. There are two storeys and attics, and four bays, the right two bays projecting slightly. On the front are three doorways with fluted pilasters, divided fanlights, entablatures and cornices. The windows are sashes with flat gauged arches, and there are four gabled dormers with casements.	II
3 and 4 Wednesday Market; 53.84132°N 0.42672°W		c. 1700	A pair of shops in painted brick, with a bracketed eaves cornice and a pantile roof. There are two storeys and attics, and five bays. In the centre of the ground floor is a round-arched opening flanked by 19th-century shopfronts. The upper floor contains sash windows, and on the roof are three gabled dormers.	II
11 and 11A Wednesday Market; 53.84118°N 0.42584°W		17th to 18th century	The public house, on a corner site, is in brick, rendered on the left gable end, with a cornice, a parapet and a slate roof. There are two storeys and attics, and a front of six bays. The ground floor contains pub fronts, the corner is recessed with columns, and on the right is a round-arched passage entry. On the upper floor are sash windows with painted brick voussoirs, and on the roof are two sloped dormers.	II
15 Wednesday Market; 53.84089°N 0.42615°W		Late 17th or early 18th century	The building has a timber framed core, it is encased in limewashed brick on a plinth, and has a moulded modillion eaves cornice and a pantile roof. There are two storeys and attics, and four bays. On the ground floor are two doorways, each with a modillion cornice, the right also with pilasters, and to the right of both is a shop window. The upper floor contains four windows, one tripartite and the others sashes, and on the roof are three dormers.	II
The Grosvenor Club; 53.84308°N 0.43014°W		Late 17th or early 18th century	The building, which was extended and refitted in 1833, is in brick on a plinth, rendered on the front, with a cornice, a parapet, and a hipped pantile roof. There are three storeys and a front of three bays, the right bay projecting slightly. The central doorway has channelled pilasters, an entablature with lion mask paterae, a rectangular fanlight, consoles and a segmental pediment. The window above the doorway is blocked, and the others are sashes, all with rendered rusticated lintels and keystones.	II
7 Hengate; 53.84457°N 0.43227°W		1708–09	The house is in red brick on a plinth with stone coping, and it has painted stone dressings, rusticated quoins, a brick eaves cornice, and a hipped pantile roof. There are two storeys and a basement, four bays, and a later rear wing. Steps with wrought iron rails and foot scrapers lead up to the doorway that has applied Doric columns, an entablature, a semicircular fanlight, and a shaped bracketed pediment. The windows are sashes with flat gauged brick arches.	II*
Market Cross; 53.84305°N 0.43269°W		1711–14	The market cross is an open shelter, with an octagonal base of three steps, on which are four pairs of coupled Roman Doric columns, and an entablature with triglyphs and guttae, on which are eight urns. On the south side are cartouches. Above is an octagonal lead cupola roof on which is an elaborate square lantern, surmounted by an obelisk and a weathervane.	I
26 Norwood; 53.84566°N 0.43004°W		c. 1719	The house is in colourwashed brown brick, and has an asbestos pantile roof with tumbled brickwork in the gable end. There are two storeys and four bays. Steps lead up to the doorway that has a rectangular three-light fanlight and a flat stone hood on brackets. The windows are sashes with moulded sills, those on the ground floor with keystones.	II
2 and 4 Butcher Row; 53.84170°N 0.42813°W		Early 18th century	A pair of shops in painted brick with a pantile roof. There are two storeys and six bays. On the ground floor are two modern shopfronts flanking a central opening with a flat arch. The upper floor contains four sash windows and two blind windows.	II
Garden wall, 7 Hengate; 53.84465°N 0.43195°W		Early 18th century	The garden wall is in brick, and is about 3 metres (9.8 ft) in height. It contains two rusticated piers and a segmental carriage arch.	II
12 Hengate; 53.84435°N 0.43245°W		Early 18th century	The house is in painted stucco, with a moulded brick ogee bracket cornice, a wooden gutter on wrought iron brackets, and a pantile roof. There are to storeys and three bays. The central doorway has pilasters, an entablature, a rectangular fanlight and a shelf cornice. Above the doorway is a blocked window, the other windows are sashes, and all the windows have stone heads and decorated keystones.	II
22 and 23 Wednesday Market; 53.84128°N 0.42706°W		Early 18th century	A pair of shops in painted brick that have an eaves cornice with shaped brackets and dentils, and a pantile roof. There are two storeys and attics, and two bays. The ground floor contains two shopfronts, on the upper floor are a sash window and to the right is a canted bay window, and on the roof are two flat-roofed dormers.	II
Arden's Vaults; 53.84438°N 0.43235°W		Early 18th century	Built as wine vaults, and later used for other purposes, the building is in painted brick, with a wood gutter on block brackets, and a pantile roof. There are two storeys and three bays. On the left bay is a segmental-arched entrance and a loading door above. In the middle bay is a recessed doorway, to the right are two small windows, and on the upper floor are sash windows.	II
Former Trustee Savings Bank; 53.84313°N 0.43318°W		Early 18th century	A house that was refronted in the late 19th century and used for other purposes. It is in brick on a plinth, with stone dressings, a moulded eaves cornice, and a pantile roof with a shaped gable containing a two-light window. There are two storeys and three bays. The ground floor bays are flanked by rusticated stone pilasters, and the upper floor contains sash windows. The rear facing Lairgate has two storeys and two bays.	II
117 and 119 Walkergate and stable wing 53.84193°N 0.42846°W		c. 1730	A house, later a shop, on a corner site, it has a timber framed core, and is encased in brick, the right gable end roughcast, with a moulded modillion cornice and a pantile roof. There are two storeys and attics, and on the ground floor is a modern shopfront. The windows are sashes, and to the right are two blind windows. To the left is a single-storey stable wing containing coach house doors, and a doorway with pilasters and an entablature.	II
26 and 28 Butcher Row; 53.84140°N 0.42743°W		18th century	A pair of shops in painted brick with a pantile roof. There are two storeys and four bays. On the ground floor are two 19th-century shopfronts with grooved pilasters and a continuous fascia. The upper floor contains sash windows with rendered lintels, and above is a roof dormer.	II
17 Ladygate; 53.84360°N 0.43241°W		Mid-18th century	The shop, which has earlier material internally, has a front of brown brick, and a pantile roof. There are two storeys and two bays. The ground floor contains two doorways, the left with a divided fanlight, and to the left is a shop window. The windows on the upper floor are sashes, and the windows and doorways have painted lintels.	II
14 Norwood; 53.84520°N 0.43081°W		Mid-18th century	The shop is limewashed and has a pantile roof. There are two storeys and two bays. The ground floor contains a late 18th-century shopfront with an entablature, a bow window and moulded consoles. To its right is a shop window with shutters, and to the left is a round-arched opening. The upper floor contains sash windows.	II
1 Saturday Market; 53.84343°N 0.43319°W		18th century	A shop on a corner site in red brick, with a bracketed eaves cornice, a fluted lead rainwater head, and a tile roof, hipped on the left. There are three storeys, three bays on the front, and one on the left return. The central doorway has a rectangular fanlight, and a pediment on consoles. To its left is a bay window, and to the right is an oriel window. The other windows are sashes, with painted voussoirs, the middle window on the top floor blind.	II
6 and 7 Saturday Market; 53.84299°N 0.43195°W		18th century (probable)	The shop is in painted brick, with bracketed eaves, some paired, and a pantile roof. There are three storeys and three bays, the left bay slightly taller. The ground floor contains a modern shopfront, and on the upper floors are sash windows, those in the right two bays with rusticated lintels and keystones.	II
13 Saturday Market; 53.84341°N 0.43248°W		Mid-18th century	The shop is rendered and has a pantile roof. There are two storeys and an attic, and one bay. On the ground floor is a bow window to the left, and a doorway with pilasters, an entablature and a divided fanlight. The upper floor has a sash window, and on the roof is a gabled dormer.	II
14 and 16 Saturday Market; 53.84328°N 0.43261°W		Mid-18th century	The building, on a corner site, is stuccoed, lined and painted, and has rusticated quoins, a stone ogee bracketed eaves cornice with a dentilled soffit, and a hipped slate roof. There are two storeys and attics, a north front of six bays, and a west front of two bays. The west front has an entrance, and a bow window to the right. The other windows are sashes, and on the roof are four gabled dormers.	II
20 Saturday Market; 53.84310°N 0.43237°W		Mid-18th century	The shop is in brown brick with a steep pantile roof. There are two storeys and one bay. On the ground floor is a shopfront with pilasters and an entablature, the upper floor contains a canted bay window with an entablature, and the roof has a skylight.	II
21 and 22 Saturday Market; 53.84304°N 0.43232°W		Mid-18th century	The building is in painted brick with a bracketed eaves cornice and a steep slate roof. There are two storeys and attics, and two bays. The ground floor contains a shopfront, on the upper floor are two canted bay windows with pilasters, and above are two pedimented dormers.	II
23 Saturday Market; 53.84298°N 0.43224°W		Mid-18th century	Formerly an inn, later a shop, it is rendered, with applied half-timbering. There are two storeys and attics, and two wide bays. On the ground floor is a shopfront containing pilasters with Corinthian capitals, a dentilled cornice and an entablature. The upper floor has two shallow bay windows, and on the roof are three dormers with moulded pediments, the middle one segmental. Between the upper floor windows is the effigy of a white swan.	II
24 and 25 Saturday Market; 53.84292°N 0.43216°W		Mid-18th century	A pair of shops in painted brick with a pantile roof. There are two storeys and attics, and two bays. On the ground floor are two shopfronts, each with a bow window and a doorway to the right. The upper floor contains two canted bay windows, each with a dentilled entablature, and above are two gabled dormers.	II
26 Saturday Market; 53.84286°N 0.43215°W	—	Mid-18th century	The building is in painted brick with a pantile roof. There are two storeys and an attic, and one bay. On the ground floor is a three-light casement window in a former shopfront with pilasters and an entablature, The upper floor contains a canted bay window with pilasters and an entablature, and above is a gabled dormer.	II
28 Saturday Market; 53.84288°N 0.43157°W		Mid-18th century	The shop is in painted brick, with an ogee bracketed eaves cornice and a pantile roof. There are three storeys and three bays. On the ground floor is a canted bay window and a doorway to the right, over which is a roof with a dentilled cornice. The middle floor has a tripartite window, the top floor contains two sash windows with a blind window between, and all the windows have brick voussoirs and keystones.	II
45 and 46 Saturday Market; 53.84229°N 0.43186°W	—	Mid-18th century	The shop is in painted brick, and has a parapet with stone coping and a pantile roof. There are three storeys and three bays. On the ground floor are two 19th-century shopfronts, and the upper floors contain sash windows. Inside, there is earlier carved woodwork moved from elsewhere and fine brass locks.	II*
49 Saturday Market; 53.84238°N 0.43206°W	—	18th century (probable)	The shop is in red brick, with a fluted lead rainwater head, and a pantile roof with stone coping and a plain course above. There are three storeys and two bays. On the ground floor is a 19th-century shopfront, and the upper floors have sash windows with painted stone or rendered rusticated heads.	II
5–9 Walkergate; 53.84472°N 0.43136°W		18th century	A row of three cottages in brick, the right gable end rendered, with a pantile roof. There are two storeys and four bays, the right bay lower. On the front are three doorways, two shop windows, sash windows and a blocked window.	II
73 and 75 Walkergate; 53.84296°N 0.42992°W		18th century	A pair of houses in brick, with a moulded wooden eaves cornice, and a pantile roof with tumbled brickwork on the gable end. There are two storeys and attics, and five bays. On the front are two doorways and sash windows, the ground floor openings with painted brick voussoirs. The middle bay contains a blocked window on each floor, and on the roof are three dormers, the right with a gabled head.	II
106 Walkergate; 53.84225°N 0.42904°W		18th century	The house is in brick, with a dentilled eaves cornice and a pantile roof. There is one storey and attics, and two bays. The central doorway has a rectangular fanlight, a coved cornice, and a gabled wooded hood with carved bargeboards. The windows are sashes with stone lintels, and there are two gabled dormers.	II
21 Wednesday Market; 53.84124°N 0.42700°W		18th century (probable)	The shop is in painted and lined stuccoed brick, and has a pantile roof. There are two storeys and an attic, and one bay. On the ground floor is a shopfront with pilasters, the upper floor contains a canted bay window, and on the roof is a small flat-roofed dormer.	II
Kings Head Hotel; 53.84243°N 0.43114°W		Mid-18th century	The hotel is in painted stucco, with rusticated quoins, a sill band, paired eaves brackets and a slate roof. There are three storeys and five bays. In the centre is a stone Greek Doric porch with unfluted columns, above which are iron railings. It is flanked by canted bay windows, and to the right is a small doorway. The upper floors contain sash windows, the central window on the middle floor with paired pilasters, a round arch and a wide archivolt.	II
The Grapes; 53.84279°N 0.43201°W		18th century	The public house, on a corner site, is in painted brick on a plinth, with rusticated quoins, string courses, a moulded eaves cornice, and a hipped pantile roof. There are two storeys and attics, five bays on the west front and four on the south front. The west front contains a 19th-century shopfront and a shop bow window, and on the south front is a doorway with an architrave and carved double console brackets, an 18th-century shopfront with a modillion cornice, a window and a pair of doors. On the upper floor are sash windows, and there are six gabled roof dormers.	II
Tymperon House; 53.84350°N 0.43084°W		Mid-18th century	Originally an almshouse, the house is in red brick on a plinth, with a moulded eaves cornice and a hipped pantile roof. There are two storeys, three bays on the front and four on the right return. Each bay on the front has a full-height recessed arch with a stone impost. The middle bay contains a moulded architrave, pilasters on stone bases, and a rectangular fanlight. The windows are sashes, those on the ground floor with stucco lintels, and those above with segmental gauged brick arches.	II
Forecourt wall, Tymperon House; 53.84351°N 0.43070°W		Mid-18th century	The low wall enclosing the forecourt of the house is in brick with stone coping.	II
Former Valiant Soldier Public House; 53.84487°N 0.43136°W		18th century	The public house is rendered and has a tile roof. There are two storeys and three bays, and a lower two-storey two-bay wing on the left. On the front is a plain doorway, above which is a gable with moulded kneelers. To its left is a bow window, and the other windows are sashes, some tripartite.	II
11 Saturday Market; 53.84350°N 0.43261°W		1755	The shop is in painted brick, with a dentilled eaves cornice, and a roof of scalloped slates. There are two storeys and an attic, and two bays. The ground floor has a shopfront containing two adjacent entrances on the right with pilasters and an entablature. On the upper floor are sash windows with stone lintels and incised keystones, and above is a pedimented dormer. Inside there are fine retained original features.	II*
90 and 92 Walkergate; 53.84277°N 0.42990°W		c. 1755	Originally a theatre, later converted into two houses, in red brick on a plinth, with a ground floor sill band, a moulded eaves cornice, and a pantile roof. There are two storeys, and attics, and five bays. The outer bays contain doorways, with shouldered architraves, chambranles, rectangular fanlights, friezes and cornices. The windows are sashes, those on the ground floor with rendered lintels, and there is one roof dormer.	II
37 Saturday Market; 53.84253°N 0.43120°W		c. 1760	The building is in red brick, with a bracketed eaves cornice and a tile roof. There are three storeys and three bays. The ground floor contains a 19th-century shopfront, with slender pilasters, a carved stone base, and a panelled and simple entablature. To the right is a doorway with an architrave, chambranles, a fanlight, enriched consoles, a tablet in the frieze, and a dentilled pediment. The upper floors have sash windows, those on the middle floor with rendered lintels.	II
Norwood House; 53.84553°N 0.43128°W		c. 1760	The house is in red brick with painted stone dressings and a hipped slate roof. It consists of a central block with three storeys and five bays, flanked by wings ending in pavilions. The ground floor of the main block is in rusticated stone, and contains a central doorway with a vermiculated rusticated surround, an architrave, a fanlight, consoles, a pulvinated frieze, three keystones and a cornice. Above it is a moulded sill band with balusters. The windows are sashes with gauged brick arches, those in the middle floor with cornices, and the central window with an architrave on stone plinths. Above is a bracketed cornice and a dentilled pediment containing a cartouche framing a bull's eye window. The pavilions protrude, the left with two storeys and the right with one storey.	I
Highgate House; 53.84093°N 0.42674°W		Mid to late 18th century	The building, on a corner site, is in red brick, with stone details, pantile roofs, two storeys and attics. The front facing Wednesday Market has three bays, sill bands, a moulded eaves cornice and a parapet. On the ground floor is a shopfront with pilasters, an entablature and a dentilled cornice. To the left is a doorway with an entablature, a rectangular fanlight, ornamental consoles, paterae, and a dentilled cornice. The upper floor contains sash windows with rusticated lintels and keystones, and above are two gabled dormers with bargeboards. The rear wing, along Lord Roberts Road, has four bays, and contains a doorway with attached Doric columns, an ornamental arched fanlight, and a modillion cornice, and there is a modern doorway to its left.	II*
16–20 Butcher Row; 53.84156°N 0.42778°W		c. 1769	Two shops in painted brick, with a dentilled eaves cornice, and a tile roof with coped gables. There are three storeys and seven bays. The ground floor has two modern shopfronts, between which is a round-headed passage doorway with a double gauged brick arch. The upper floors contain sash windows.	II
Walkergate House; 53.84348°N 0.43041°W		c. 1775	The house is in red brick on a stone plinth, with a sill band, a painted ogee bracketed eaves cornice, and a tile roof. There are three storeys and five bays. Steps with iron rails lead up to the central doorway that has an architrave, chambranles, a fanlight, a frieze with a central tablet, decorated consoles, and a dentilled pediment. The windows are sashes with flat brick gauged arches.	II
36 Butcher Row; 53.84130°N 0.42716°W		Late 18th century	A shop on a corner site in red brick, with a pantile roof and tumbled brickwork on the gable end. There are two storeys and an attic, and three bays. The left bay contains a doorway with a moulded architrave, a frieze with a central tablet, and a pediment. To the right is an early 19th-century shopfront that has moulded pilasters with foliate capitals and a moulded entablature. The windows are sashes with painted voussoirs.	II
5 Hengate; 53.84447°N 0.43251°W		Late 18th century	The house is in red brick, with a moulded eaves cornice and a tile roof. There are two storeys and two bays. The doorway in the right bay has pilasters, an entablature and a rectangular fanlight. The windows are sashes with rendered lintels.	II
5A Hengate; 53.84450°N 0.43243°W		Late 18th century	The house is in red brick, with a moulded eaves cornice, and a tile roof with tumbled brickwork on the gable end. There are two storeys and two bays. The doorway in the right bay has pilasters and a rectangular fanlight, and above it is a small window. The right bay contains sashes with rendered lintels.	II
8 Hengate; 53.84418°N 0.43297°W		Late 18th century	A coach house, then a brush factory, later used for other purposes, it is in red brick, and has a pantile roof with tumbled brickwork on the gable end. There is a single storey, and on the front facing the road is a window with an arched head.	II
14 Hengate; 53.84437°N 0.43238°W		Late 18th century	The house is in painted brick, with a boxed wood gutter on iron brackets, and a pantile roof. There are two storeys and one bay. The doorway on the right has a plain surround, and the windows are sashes, the ground floor window with brick voussoirs.	II
50 Saturday Market; 53.84242°N 0.43214°W		Late 18th century (probable)	The shop is in red brick, with a modillion eaves cornice, a fluted lead rainwater head, and a pantile head. There are three storeys and three bays. On the ground floor is an original shopfront with pilasters, an entablature, and a decorated soffit to the cornice. To the right is a doorway with pilasters, a reeded transom and a rectangular fanlight. The upper floors contain sash windows with rusticated painted heads.	II
19 Walkergate; 53.84452°N 0.43116°W		Late 18th century	The building is in brick with a pantile roof. There are two storeys and three bays, the left bay taller. The left bay contains a shop window with a doorway to its right, and in the right bay is a carriage doorway. The windows are a mix of sashes and modern windows, and on the left bay is a flat-roofed dormer.	II
21–27 Walkergate; 53.84440°N 0.43106°W		Late 18th century	A terrace of four houses in red brick, with a pantile roof and tumbled brickwork on the gable end. There are two storeys and five bays. On the front are four doorways with rectangular fanlights, and to the right is a round-arched passage entry. The upper floor contains sash windows.	II
57 and 58 Saturday Market; 53.84266°N 0.43258°W		1777	A pair of shops in painted brick, with a shaped bracketed timber modillion eaves cornice, and a tile roof. There are three storeys and four bays. The ground floor contains two shopfronts, one modern and the other dating from the 19th century, On the middle floor are three canted bay windows with moulded entablatures, and the top floor has four sash windows with painted voussoirs.	II
3 Hengate; 53.84443°N 0.43264°W		1778	The house is in red brick, with a dentilled eaves cornice and a pantile roof. There are two storeys and four bays. The doorway has an architrave, chambranles, a three-light fanlight, a frieze, a dentilled pediment and decorative consoles, and there is passage doorway to the right with a similar fanlight. The windows are sashes with brick voussoirs. On the roof is a gabled dormer.	II
4 Ladygate; 53.84394°N 0.43317°W		c. 1780	The shop is in brick with a pantile roof. There are two storeys and attics, and three bays. The doorway in the left bay has a plain surround, the windows are horizontally sliding sashes and there are three dormers.	II
Wall, 67 Walkergate; 53.84357°N 0.43059°W		c. 1780	Attached to the left of Walkergate House is a brick quadrant wall with a stone base and stone coping. It ends in a pier surmounted by a stone urn with drapery.	II
94 and 96 Walkergate; 53.84255°N 0.42941°W		c. 1780	A pair of houses in red brick, with a wooden eaves board on paired brackets, and a pantile roof with tumbled brickwork on the gable end. There are two storeys and attics, and three bays. The left doorway has pilasters, a frieze and a cornice, the right doorway has a plain surround and both have rectangular fanlights. The windows are sashes, the ground floor windows and the right doorway with painted flat gauged brick arches. On the roof is a gabled dormer.	II
1 Wednesday Market; 53.84138°N 0.42696°W		c. 1780	The shop is in red brick on a plinth with a bullnose edge, and it has a bracketed eaves cornice, ornamental iron spouting and a pantile roof. There are two storeys and four bays. In the left two bays on the ground floor is a 19th-century shopfront, and to its right is a doorway with a moulded architrave, a three-light rectangular fanlight, a frieze with a central tablet, and a dentilled pediment. The window above the doorway is blind, and the other windows are sashes with painted gauged brick heads.	II
Gates, gate piers and railings, Norwood House; 53.84530°N 0.43115°W		c. 1780	The forecourt of the house is enclosed by wrought iron railings on a low stone wall. These contain two sets of wrought iron gates flanked by rusticated stone piers. Each pier has a moulded base, a square crowning block with an inset oval medallion and a ball finial.	I
98 and 100 Walkergate; 53.84246°N 0.42929°W		c. 1780–90	A pair of houses in red brick, with a dentilled eaves cornice, and a pantile roof with tumbled brickwork on the gable end. There are two storeys and attics, and four bays. The doorways and the windows, which are horizontally sliding sashes, have segmental heads. On the roof are four flat-roofed dormers.	II
8 Wednesday Market; 53.84129°N 0.42629°W		1785	The building is in brick with a bracketed eaves cornice and a slate roof. There are three storeys and attics, and four bays. The ground floor contains a late 19-century shopfront, and to the right is a doorway with panelled reveals and an arched fanlight. On the central two bays of the middle floor are square bay windows, and the other windows are casements with painted flat arches.	II
13 Wednesday Market; 53.84102°N 0.42594°W		c. 1790	The building is in painted brick, with paired eaves brackets and a pantile roof. There are three storeys and three bays. The central doorway has an architrave, a round-arched fanlight, and a dentilled pediment on decorative consoles, and to the right is a shopfront with pilasters. The windows are sashes with flat heads, those on the lower two floors with carved voussoirs.	II
14 Wednesday Market; 53.84097°N 0.42602°W		c. 1800	The shop is in red brick on a plinth, with a wooden eaves gutter and a pantile roof. There are three storeys and three bays. On the ground floor is a shop window, to the right is a doorway, and to the left is a round-arched passage entry. The windows are sashes, those on the middle floor with painted carved stone heads.	II
83 and 85 Walkergate; 53.84277°N 0.42951°W		Late 18th or early 19th century	A pair of houses in brick with a slate roof. There are two storeys and attics, and two bays. The doorways have moulded surrounds, entablatures, rectangular fanlights, the right with ornamental glazing, and flat cornices on block consoles. The windows are sashes with rendered rusticated lintels.	II
Lamp standard, 2 Beaver House; 53.84189°N 0.42747°W		1824–26	The lamp standard is in cast iron, and has a square stepped base with a wreathed shield with lion mask on each face. On this is an octagonal step, and a column, fluted in the lower part, the upper part tapering, surmounted by a copper lantern.	II
4 Hengate; 53.84400°N 0.43338°W	—	Early 19th century	The house is in red brick, with a wood eaves gutter on widely spaced block brackets, and a slate roof. There are three storeys and two bays. The doorway in the left bay has pilasters, an entablature and a rectangular fanlight, and to its right is an inset iron foot scraper. The windows are sashes with painted stone heads, and above the windows on the two lower floors are sunk panels with stucco mouldings.	II
1 Ladygate; 53.84399°N 0.43332°W		Early 19th century	The house, on a corner site, is in red brick in a plinth, with block brackets to the eaves soffit, and a slate roof, hipped on the corner. There are three storeys, two bays on the front and two on the right return. The central doorway has pilasters, an entablature, and a divided rectangular fanlight. The windows are sashes, those in the lower two floors with stuccoed flat arches and voussoirs.	II
8A Saturday Market; 53.84368°N 0.43274°W		Early 19th century	The building, on a corner site, is in painted brick, with flat eaves on spaced brackets, and a hipped slate roof. There are two storeys, three bays on the front facing Ladygate, and one on the left return. There are three doorways, one across the corner, all with pilasters, friezes and cornices. The upper floor contains two horizontally sliding sash windows and a fixed light window.	II
17 Saturday Market; 53.84323°N 0.43254°W		Early 19th century	The building is stuccoed, painted and lined, and has eaves brackets and a slate roof. There are three storeys and two bays. On the ground floor is a modern shopfront with a central entrance, the middle floor contains two canted bay windows, and on the top floor are sash windows with moulded surrounds.	II
18 and 19 Saturday Market; 53.84316°N 0.43244°W		Early 19th century	A pair of buildings in brown brisk with bracketed eaves, three storeys and three bays. On the ground floor are two shopfronts, the left with a bow window, and the right dating from the late 19th century with pilasters and an entablature; both have entrances with rectangular fanlights. The middle floor has a bow window on the left, and the other windows are sashes.	II
36 Saturday Market; 53.84260°N 0.43125°W		Early 19th century	The building is in painted stucco, the ground floor with channelled rustication, with rusticated quoins, a sill band and a slate roof. There are three storeys and three bays. The doorway has fluted pilasters, an entablature and a blank fanlight, and on the upper floors are sash windows.	II
47 and 48 Saturday Market; 53.84233°N 0.43198°W	—	Early 19th century	The house is in red brick, partly painted, with painted sill bands, widely spaced paired eaves brackets, a lead vase-shaped fluted rainwater head, and a Westmorland slate roof. There are three storeys and three bays. On the ground floor are two shopfronts from about 1870, and to the left is a doorway with pilasters and a dentilled entablature. The upper floors contain sash windows with painted lintels.	II
59 Saturday Market; 53.84274°N 0.43265°W		Early 19th century (probable)	The shop is in red brick, with an eaves board on small brackets and a slate roof. There are three storeys, two bays, and a rear extension with a hipped pantile roof. The ground floor has a shopfront and a round-headed passage entry to the left. On the middle floor are modern windows with pulvinated friezes and moulded cornices, and the top floor contains sash windows.	II
87 Walkergate; 53.84273°N 0.42942°W		Early 19th century	The house is in red brick with a tile roof. There are three storeys and two bays. The doorway in the right bay has pilasters, a rectangular fanlight, panelled reveals and a cornice. The windows are sashes with rusticated stucco lintels.	II
99 and 101 Walkergate; 53.84247°N 0.42902°W		Early 19th century	A pair of shops in red brick on a corner site, with a pantile roof. There are three storeys and a front of two bays. On the ground floor are two shopfronts with pilasters, each with windows of three lights, and a common entablature and cornice. The upper floors contain sash windows with rusticated stuccoed lintels, those on the middle floor also with keystones. On the right return is a doorway with pilasters and a cornice, above which are two circular windows.	II
2 Wednesday Market; 53.84136°N 0.42684°W		Early 19th century (mainly)	The shop is in red brick, with a sill band and a pantile roof. There are three storeys and three bays. On the ground floor is a shopfront, and a doorway with a fanlight to the right. The middle floor contains two canted splay bay windows, and on the top floor are two sash windows flanking a blind window.	II
18 Wednesday Market; 53.84089°N 0.42646°W		Early 19th century	The building is in brick, with plain eaves brackets and a hipped pantile roof. There are three storeys and two bays. On the ground floor is a shopfront with an entablature, sunk panelled pilasters with lion masks, and a doorway with a rectangular fanlight. The middle floor contains two square bay windows, each with pilasters and an entablature, and on the top floor are sash windows with painted flat arches.	II
2, 4 and 6 Well Lane; 53.84125°N 0.42750°W		Early 19th century	A row of three shops in brown brick with a pantile roof. There are two storeys and three bays. In the centre is a shopfront, the outer bays contain doorways with rectangular fanlight, and the windows are sashes.	II
Angel Hotel; 53.84176°N 0.42782°W		Early 19th century (probable)	The public house, on a corner site, is stuccoed, on a plinth, the round floor with horizontal rustication, with a sill band, widely spaced plain brackets at the eaves, and a tile roof, with slate at the front. There are three storeys, three bays on the front, the ground floor is rounded on the corner, two bays on the right return, and two-storey rear wings. The doorway has pilasters and an entablature, and the windows are sashes.	II
Lamp standard, 19 Butcher Row; 53.84165°N 0.42775°W		After 1826	The lamp standard is in cast iron, and has a square stepped base. On this is an octagonal step, and a column, fluted in the lower part, the upper part tapering, surmounted by a copper lantern.	II
39 Ladygate; 53.84296°N 0.43164°W		c. 1830–40	The shop is in red brick, with an eaves band, spaced brackets to flat eaves, and a slate roof. There are three storeys and two bays. On the front is a contemporary shopfront with pilasters, a frieze and a cornice, and to the left is a sash window and a passage doorway. Above are sash windows, and the doorway and windows have flat stucco arches.	II
8 Saturday Market; 53.84361°N 0.43284°W		Early to mid-19th century	The shop is in brown brick, with widely spaced eaves brackets and a slate roof. There are three storeys and three bays. The central doorway has pilasters, an entablature, a rectangular fanlight and a cornice. The upper floors contain sash windows with rendered lintels, the central window on the middle floor with a cornice on console brackets, above which is a recessed panel with a wreath.	II
115 Walkergate; 53.84209°N 0.42862°W		Early to mid-19th century	The house is in white brick, with overhanging bracketed eaves and a slate roof. There are two storeys and three bays. The central doorway has moulded pilasters, an entablature, a rectangular fanlight, panelled reveals and soffit, and a cornice. The window above the doorway is blind, and the other windows are sashes with rendered lintels.	II
8 Ladygate; 53.84378°N 0.43289°W		c. 1840–50	The house is in red brick, probably encasing an earlier building. The ground floor is rendered with horizontal grooving, and above is a floor band, shallow flat eaves on spaced brackets, and a slate roof. There are three storeys and three bays. The central doorway is in a shallow cambered recess and has a segmental-arched fanlight. The windows are recessed sashes, those in the upper floors with rendered flat arches and incised keystones.	II
Rear part of the Regal Cinema; 53.84544°N 0.43190°W	—	1848	Built as an extension to the Assembly Rooms of 1761–63 by John Carr, which have been demolished, it was used as a cinema and later for other purposes. The building is in red brick, with one storey and five bays, and contains Diocletian windows.	II
103–113 Walkergate; 53.84227°N 0.42876°W		c. 1850	A terrace of six houses in grey brick with a slate roof. There are two storeys and twelve bays. The doorways are paired, and have pilasters, rectangular fanlights, and dentilled cornices. Most of the windows are sashes with rendered lintels, and one house has an added bow window.	II
2 and 2A Ladygate; 53.84398°N 0.43321°W		Mid-19th century	The shop is in red brick with a pantile roof, three storeys and two bays. The ground floor contains a shopfront with a frieze and a cornice, and to the right is a doorway with a four-centred arched head with carved spandrels, thin pilasters, a frieze and a cornice. On the middle floor is a canted oriel window, and the top floor has two sash windows in architraves.	II
6 Ladygate; 53.84389°N 0.43305°W		Mid-19th century	The building, which probably has an earlier origin, is in painted brick, with dentilled eaves, three storeys and three bays. The central doorway has a plain surround, and the windows, which vary, have flat gauged arches.	II
1 and 3 Norwood Far Grove; 53.84963°N 0.42583°W		Mid-19th century	A pair of stuccoed houses with an overhanging hipped slate roof. There are two storeys, a central range of four bays, and flanking taller projecting channelled wings. In the centre are paired porches with square columns and plain pilasters, and doorways with rectangular fanlights. Above the porch is a blocked window, and the other windows are sashes, those on the wings with architraves and cornices.	II
61 and 62 Saturday Market; 53.84291°N 0.43286°W		Mid-19th century	A block of a shop and offices on a corner site in red brick, with stone dressings, a moulded sill band, a dentilled cornice with elaborate brackets, and a Welsh slate roof, hipped on the corner. There are three storeys and attics, three bays on the front, three bays on the right return, and a curved bay on the corner. The ground floor contains a bank front on the left, and a shopfront curved round the corner. On the middle floor of the front are three sash windows with pilasters, the middle one with a decorated segmental pediment, and the outer ones in oriel windows, with scrolled pediments. The other windows are round-headed casements with pilasters and archivolts with keystones.	II
16 and 17 Wednesday Market; 53.84080°N 0.42642°W		Mid-19th century	A pair of houses, later used for other purposes, in red brick on a plinth with moulded stone coping, with eaves brackets, and a pantile roof. There are two storeys and attics, and four bays. In the centre of the ground floor is a round-arched passage entry flanked by doorways, each with pilasters, an entablature and a cornice with cresting. The windows are sashes with brick voussoirs, and on the roof are three two-light dormers with ornamental cresting.	II
Lamp standard opposite 4 Sow Hill; 53.84338°N 0.43285°W		Mid-19th century	The lamp standard is in cast iron. It is in two stages, on a round plinth with a moulded top and base, and an onion-shaped base to the upper stage. It is surmounted by a modern reproduction lantern.	II
52, 53 and 54 Saturday Market; 53.84252°N 0.43235°W		1853	The shops and offices are in rendered brick, with painted stone dressings, paired Ionic or Corinthian pilasters on the corners, a sill band, an entablature with a dentilled cornice, a blocking course and a slate roof. There are three storeys and three bays. On the ground floor are 20th-century shopfronts with a passage between. The middle floor has three square bay windows with moulded surrounds and entablatures, the middle window with an elaborately decorated cornice, and between them are Ionic pilasters. On the top floor are sash windows with engaged Corinthian pilasters, entablatures and moulded pediments, the middle one segmental and decorated.	II
2 Hengate; 53.84396°N 0.43347°W	—	c. 1860	The shop is in red brick, with a wooden eaves gutter on block brackets, and a slate roof. There are three storeys and five bays. On the ground floor is a full-width shopfront with pilasters and a moulded entablature. The middle floor contains French windows with cornices, and the top floor has casement windows, all with moulded architraves and wrought iron guards.	II
National Westminster Bank; 53.84274°N 0.43274°W		1864	The bank is in stone, and in Italianate style. There are three storeys and four bays. On the ground floor are four round-arches with keystones, divided by columns, the left a doorway, and the others windows. Above is a narrow balcony on carved consoles. On the middle floor is an arcade of round-arched windows with decorated keystones, divided by Ionic half-columns with swags. On the top floor are four round-arched windows, above which are moulded hood moulds with carved finials. Over this is a bracketed cornice, and a curved segmental pediment with blank strapwork labels and a leaf finial.	II
Beverley High School; 53.84579°N 0.43052°W		1875	Originally St Mary's School, later integrated into Beverley High School, it was designed by J. B. and W. Atkinson. It is in red brick with stone dressings and a Welsh slate roof, and is in three parts. The right part is a wide single-storey gabled wing, containing a mullioned and transomed window with a hood mould containing a plaque, and above it is a small bellcote with bargeboards. In the centre is a single-storey range with an oriel window, an arched doorway to the left, and a half-hipped roof. The left wing has two storeys, a projecting porch with a recessed doorway on the left and sash windows, and above it is a mullioned and transomed window.	II
Former Corn Exchange; 53.84284°N 0.43182°W		1886	The corn exchange, later used for other purposes, is in brick and terracotta, partly painted, with a Welsh slate roof and a glazed clerestory. In the centre are paired round-arched doorways, flanked by channelled pilasters with grooved cornices and rosettes. Above is a large semicircular window with a keystone, an inscribed tablet with a moulded surround, and a gable containing a coat of arms, swags and the date, surmounted by an iron weathervane. The flanking bays each contains a window with a pediment, and on the corner is a pilaster with a ball finial.	II

== See also ==
- Listed buildings in Beverley (south area)
- Listed buildings in Beverley (west and southwest areas)
- Listed buildings in Beverley (southeast area)
- Listed buildings in Beverley (north area)
