= 45 and 46 Saturday Market =

Building in Beverley, East Riding of Yorkshire, England

Coordinates: 53.8422°N 0.4319°W

45 and 46 Saturday Market is a historic building in Beverley, a town in the East Riding of Yorkshire, in England.

The building was constructed in the mid-18th century. In the mid-19th century, shop fronts were inserted on the ground floor. The building was grade II* listed in 1969.

The shop is in painted brick, and has a parapet with stone coping and a pantile roof. There are three storeys and three bays. On the ground floor are the 19th-century shopfronts, with 20th-century plate glass, and the upper floors contain sash windows. Inside, two original staircases survive, the grand main staircase and simpler rear one. There is earlier carved woodwork moved probably from the demolished Hotham House. All the doors have fine brass locks, added by the locksmith John Tygar, who owned the house in the 1760s.

== See also ==
- Grade II* listed buildings in the East Riding of Yorkshire
- Listed buildings in Beverley (central and northeast areas)
