= Highgate House, Beverley =

House in Beverley, East Riding of Yorkshire, England

Coordinates: 53.8409°N 0.4268°W

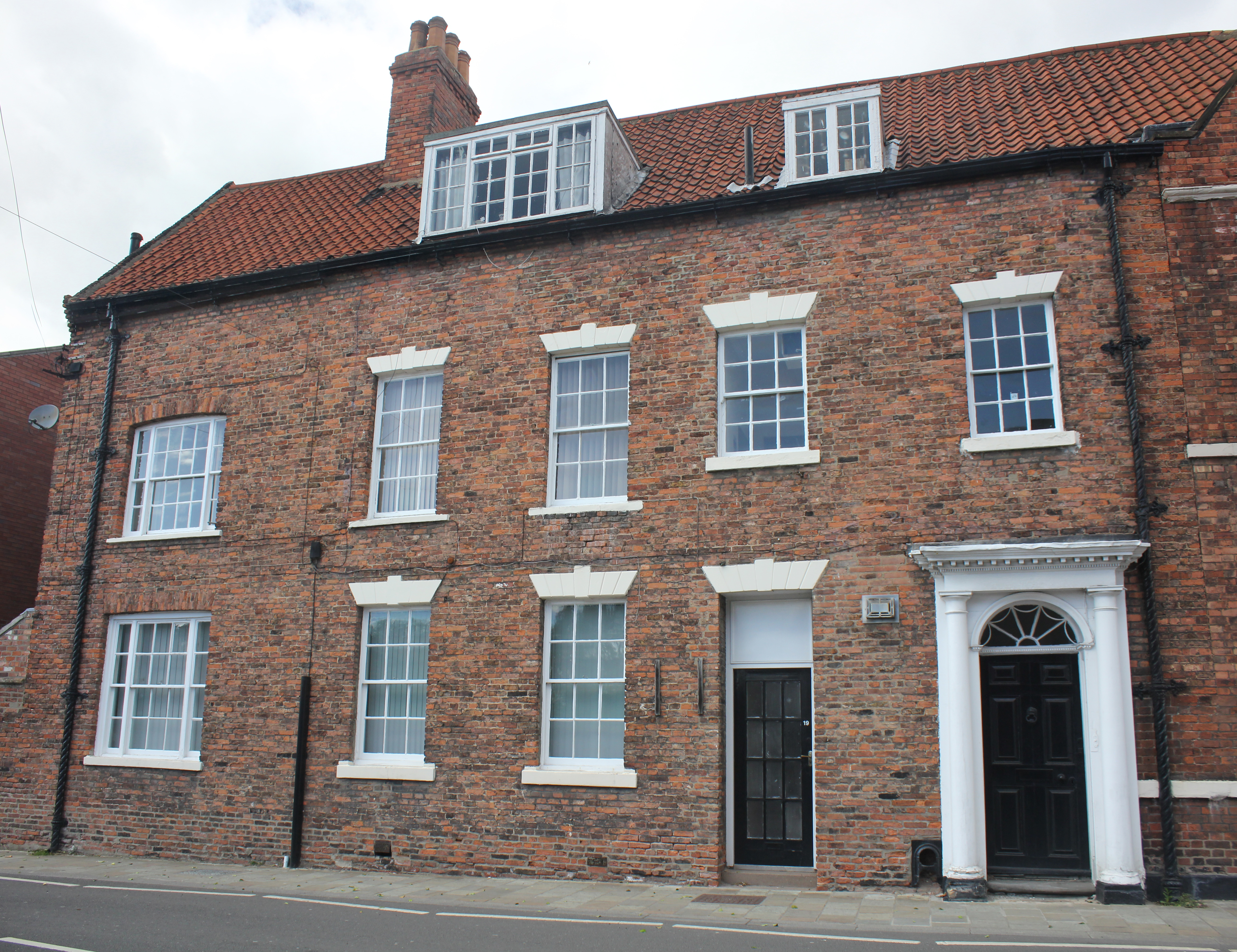
The building, in 2017

Highgate House is a historic building in Beverley, a town in the East Riding of Yorkshire, in England.

The house was constructed on Wednesday Market in the mid or late 18th century. The stairs and an original ground floor door are similar to those at 62 North Bar Without, also in the town. In 1909, the two southern bays of the house were demolished for the construction of Lord Roberts Road. In the mid-20th century, it was renamed "Radio House". Later in the century, it became a showroom for the local gas board, then a solicitors' office. The building was grade II* listed in 1950.

The building, now on a corner site, is built of red brick, with stone details, pantile roofs, two storeys and attics. The front facing Wednesday Market has three bays, sill bands, a moulded eaves cornice and a parapet. On the ground floor is a shopfront with pilasters, an entablature and a dentilled cornice. To the left is a doorway with an entablature, a rectangular fanlight, ornamental consoles, paterae, and a dentilled cornice. The upper floor contains sash windows with rusticated lintels and keystones, and above are two gabled dormers with bargeboards. The rear wing, along Lord Roberts Road, has four bays, and contains a doorway with attached Doric columns, an ornamental arched fanlight, and a modillion cornice, and there is a modern doorway to its left. Inside, the original staircase survives, as does extensive panelling and a doorway to the ground floor front room.

== See also ==
- Grade II* listed buildings in the East Riding of Yorkshire
- Listed buildings in Beverley (central and northeast areas)
