= Flaunden =

Village in Hertfordshire, England

Coordinates: 51.698°N 0.530°W

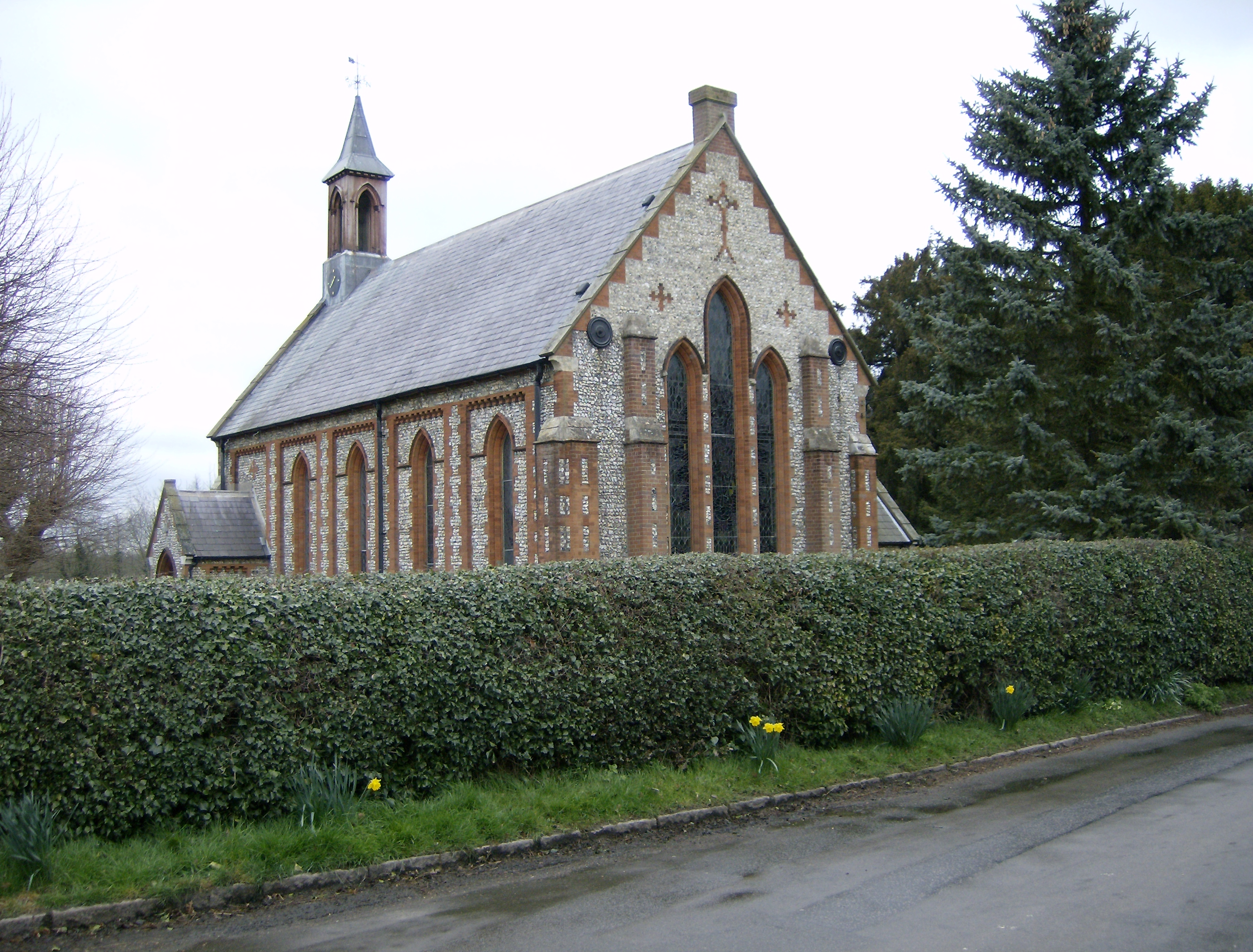
- St Mary Magdalene Church, Flaunden

- Location within Hertfordshire
- Population: 287
- OS grid reference: TL017009
- District: Dacorum
- Shire county: Hertfordshire
- Region: East
- Country: England
- Sovereign state: United Kingdom
- Post town: Hemel Hempstead
- Postcode district: HP3
- Dialling code: 01442
- Police: Hertfordshire
- Fire: Hertfordshire
- Ambulance: East of England
- UK Parliament: South West Hertfordshire

Flaunden is a village and civil parish in Hertfordshire, England, close to the border with Buckinghamshire, on the edge of the Chiltern Hills. Old Flaunden was on the banks of the River Chess, but owing to constant flooding, the settlement moved up the hill to its present location in the 18th and early 19th century.

== Etymology ==
The name Flaunden is first attested in the thirteenth century, in the forms Flawenden, Flawendene, and (from 1279) Flauden and Flaudene. There is no doubt that the -den(e) element is Old English denu ("valley"). As a second element, denu is compounded most often with a personal name or a descriptive word as first element. Accordingly, suggestions are an otherwise unattested Old English personal name *Flaha (in which case Flaunden meant "Flaha's valley") or *flage ("flagstone", in which case Flaunden meant "flagstone valley"). David Mills prefers the latter suggestion.

== History ==
The manor of Flaunden is first mentioned in a dated document in 1279, but other grants of land connected with the manor precede this, when the manor was held by Nicholas de Flaunden. Old Flaunden was on the banks of the River Chess in, but owing to constant flooding and disease, the villagers began to move up the hill to the present location during the 18th century. The old church was abandoned in 1838 and is in the form of a Greek cross dating from about 1230; it is now a ruin with remnants of walls up to 5 feet (1.5 m) high in a wood by the river. The new church at the top of the hill was built in 1838 and was the first church designed by Sir George Gilbert Scott. By the end of the 19th century, only two cottages and an orchard remained on the original village site, which is now a meadow.

The former Baptist chapel in Flaunden dates from 1836 and closed in 1985. It is now a private residence but the chapel's graveyard remains alongside.

Flaunden has two pubs: The Bricklayers Arms and The Green Dragon, a Grade II listed building dating from the early 17th century which is on the Campaign for Real Ale's National Inventory of Historic Pub Interiors.

== St Mary Magdalene Church ==
Work on new Church of England parish church started in 1837 to the design of George Gilbert Scott, a young nephew of the parson, the Reverend Samuel King. It is a simple rectangular building with a west gallery, typical of that era, but was later described by Scott as "a poor barn". It was consecrated in 1838, dedicated to Saint Mary Magdelene. The late medieval Baptismal font, a bell dated 1578 and some medieval encaustic tiles in the porch were brought from the old church, as was timber used for the doors and the Communion rail. The 1955 east window depicts Christ in Majesty and is by John Hayward. A ceiling was added in 1980. The church was made a Grade II listed building in 1986. Forming part of the Chenies Benefice, services are at held St Mary's every Sunday morning. A church room is next door.

== Gallery ==
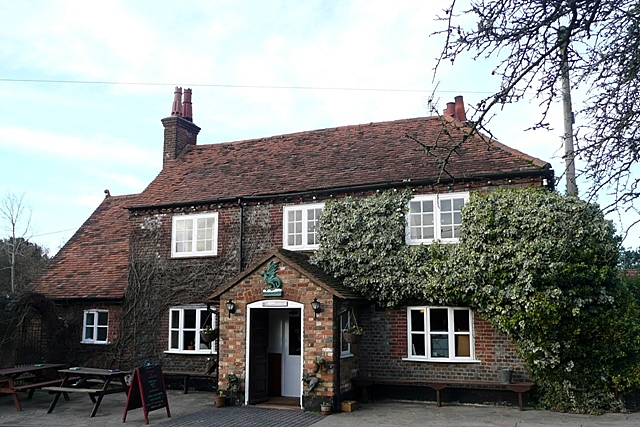
The Green Dragon

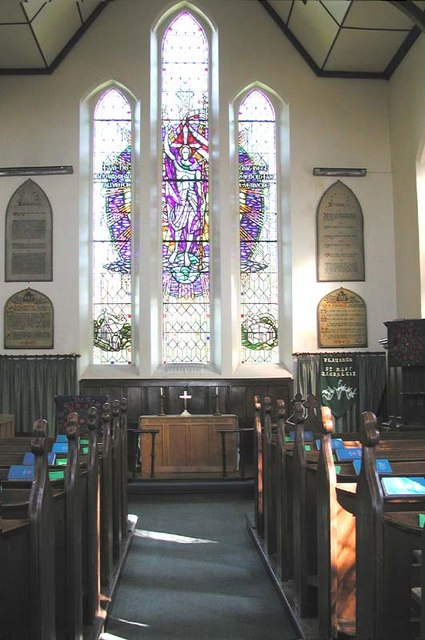
Church interior with east window

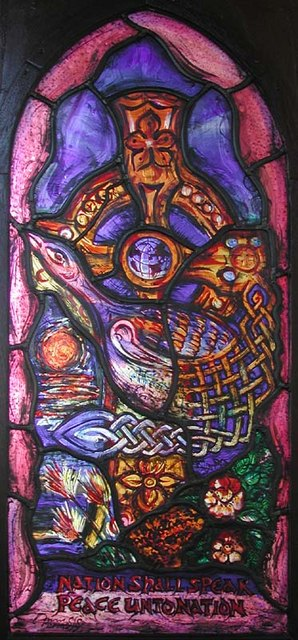
Window in church
