= Tymperon House =

House in Beverley, East Riding of Yorkshire, England

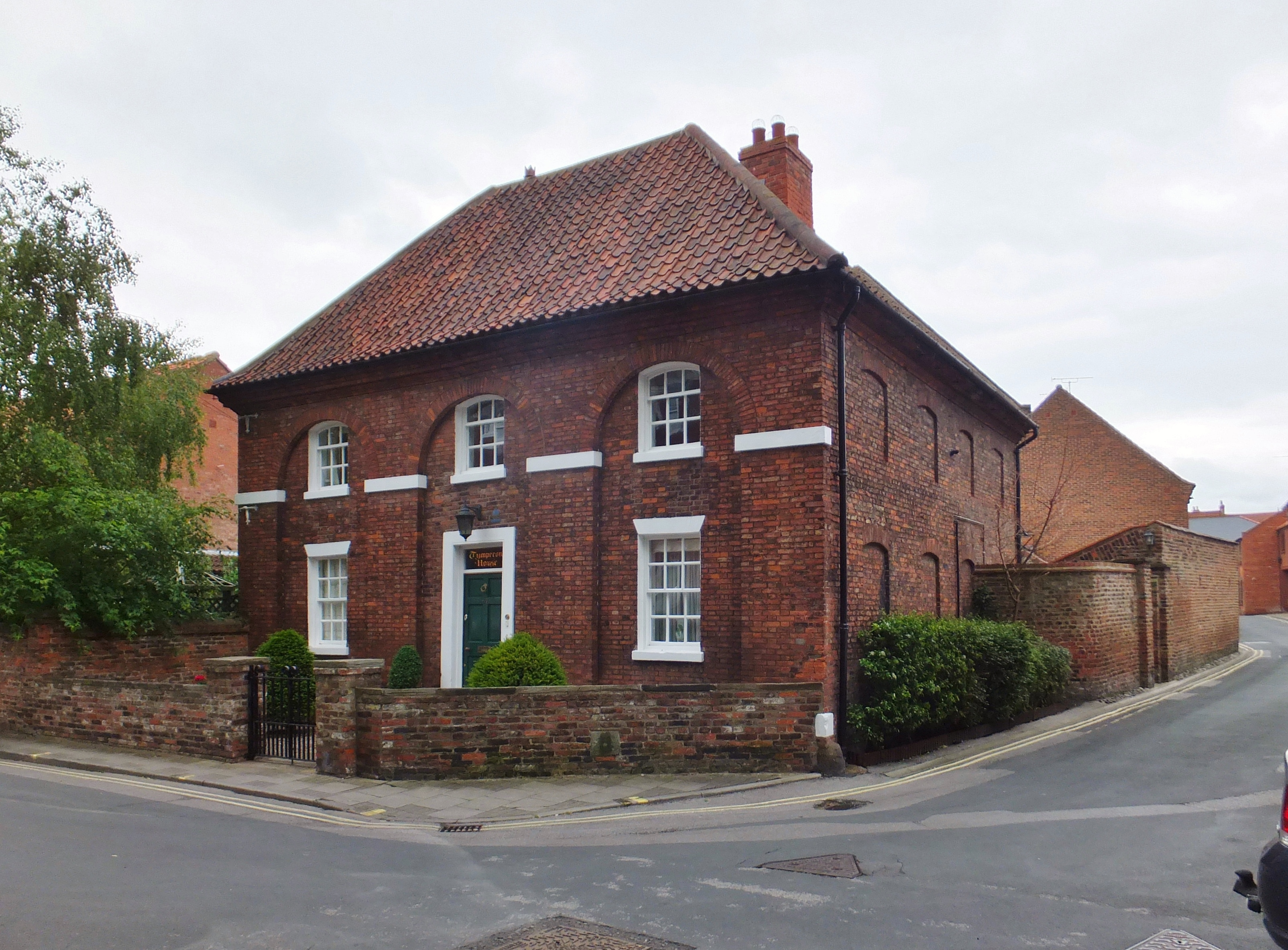
The building, in 2015

Tymperon House is a historic building in Beverley, a town in the East Riding of Yorkshire, in England.

William Tymperon left money in his will for the construction and maintenance of an almshouse in Beverley. His will was proved in 1729, and the building was completed in 1731. The designer is not known with certainty, but may have been William Etty or John Moyser. The building was grade II listed in 1950. It was converted into a private house in the 20th century. In 2024, it was marketed for sale for £800,000, at which time it had four bedrooms, three reception rooms and a kitchen.

The house is built of red brick on a plinth, with a moulded eaves cornice and a hipped pantile roof. It has two storeys, three bays on the front and four on the right return. Each bay on the front has a full-height recessed arch with a stone impost. The middle bay contains a moulded architrave, pilasters on stone bases, and a rectangular fanlight. The windows are sashes, those on the ground floor with stucco lintels, and those above with segmental gauged brick arches. Inside, there is a central corridor which the rooms lead off.

== See also ==
- Listed buildings in Beverley (central and northeast areas)
