= The King's Head, Beverley =

Hotel in Beverley, East Riding of Yorkshire, England

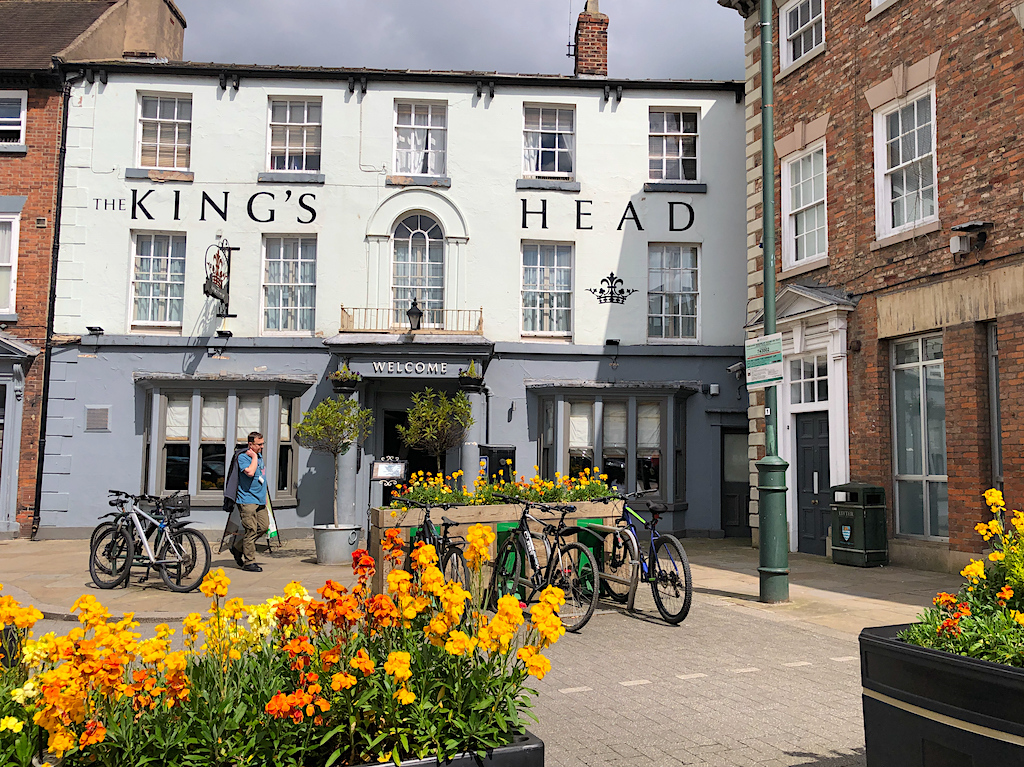
The pub, in 2023

The King's Head is a historic hotel in Beverley, a town in the East Riding of Yorkshire, in England.

The hotel was constructed in the mid-18th century and was altered in the early 19th century. It was grade II listed in 1950. In 2015, the hotel was owned by the Revere chain, which redecorated the interior and partially rearranged the public areas.

The hotel is in painted stucco, with rusticated quoins, a sill band, paired eaves brackets and a slate roof. There are three storeys and five bays. In the centre is a stone Greek Doric porch with unfluted columns, above which are iron railings. It is flanked by canted bay windows, and to the right is a small doorway. The upper floors contain sash windows, the central window on the middle floor with paired pilasters, a round arch and a wide archivolt. Inside, the original staircase survives.

== See also ==
- Listed buildings in Beverley (central and northeast areas)
