= The Grapes, Beverley =

Pub in Beverley, East Riding of Yorkshire, England

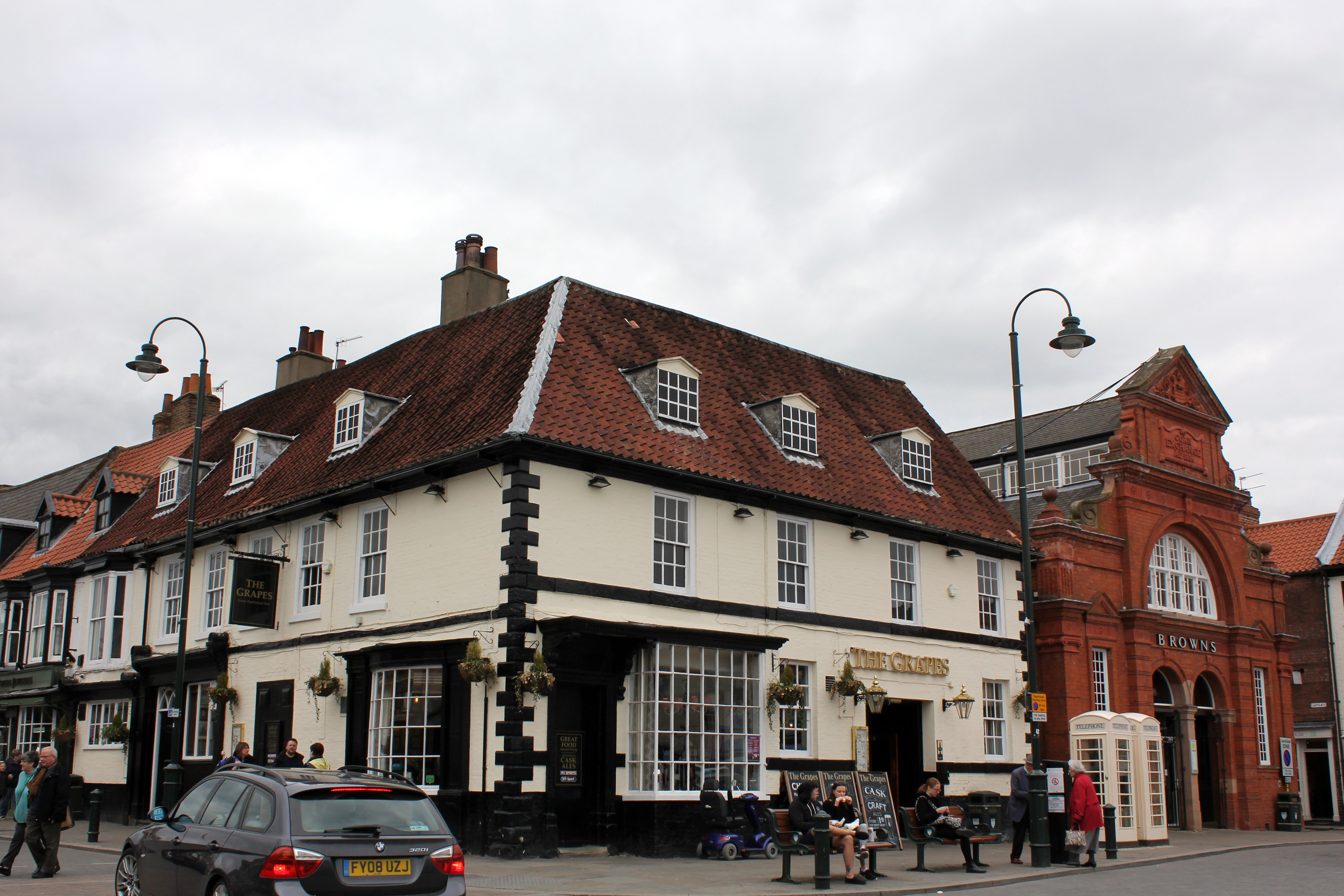
The pub, in 2017

The Grapes is a historic pub in Beverley, a town in the East Riding of Yorkshire, in England.

The building, on Saturday Market, was constructed in about 1751, when it was granted an alcohol licence. It was refitted in the 19th century, and the ground floor of the west front was rebuilt. It was nicknamed "The Push", after a sign on a door, and in the 1990s, this became its official name. In the early 21st century, it returned to its original name. The building has been grade II listed since 1950.

The pub is on a prominent corner site. It is constructed of painted brick on a plinth, with rusticated quoins, string courses, a moulded eaves cornice, and a hipped pantile roof. There are two storeys and attics, five bays on the west front and four on the south front. The west front contains a 19th-century shopfront and a shop bow window, and on the south front is a doorway with an architrave and carved double console brackets, an 18th-century shopfront with a modillion cornice, a window and a pair of doors. On the upper floor are sash windows, and there are six gabled roof dormers. Inside, the original staircase survives, and there is a 19th-century bar.

== See also ==
- Listed buildings in Beverley (central and northeast areas)
