= White Horse Inn, Beverley =

Pub in the East Riding of Yorkshire, England

White Horse Inn
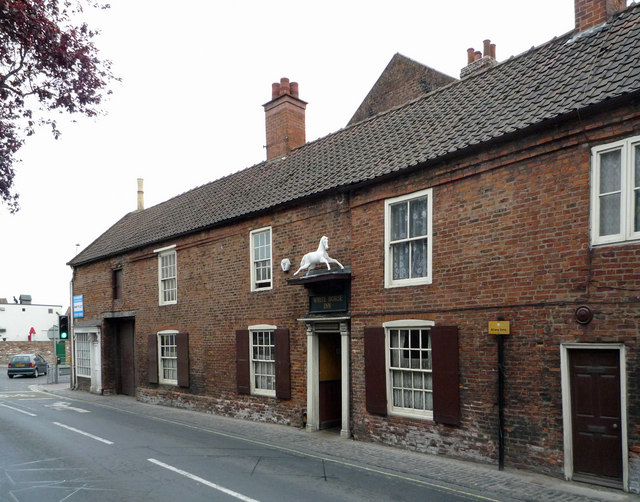
- The pub in 2008

- Location within East Riding of Yorkshire
- Alternative names: Nellie's

General information
- Location: Hengate, Beverley, East Riding of Yorkshire, England
- Coordinates: 53°50′40″N 0°25′54″W
- Year built: Medieval
- Renovated: Late 17th century (refronted)
- Owner: Samuel Smith's

Listed Building – Grade II*
- Official name: Foster and Plumpton Chemist; White Horse Hotel
- Designated: 1 March 1950
- Reference no.: 1346350

The White Horse Inn is a historic pub on Hengate in Beverley, a town in the East Riding of Yorkshire, England.

The building is medieval and was refronted in the late 17th century. It was first recorded as the White Horse Inn in 1666. From 1927 it was owned by the Collinson family, and it is still locally known as Nellie's, after a long-term landlady from the family. In 1976, it was purchased by the Samuel Smith Old Brewery, which maintain it with open fires, chandeliers and mostly gas lighting. The Hull Daily Mail describe it as having a "good claim on being the most atmospheric pub in East Yorkshire". In 2025, it was named as one of the top 100 hostelries in Europe by the European Bar Guide. The building, which includes a neighbouring shop, has been Grade II* listed since 1950.

The pub and shop have a timber framed core, and were enclosed in brick in the late 17th century. The building has a tiled roof and two storeys. The main doorway to the pub has decorated pilasters, shaped consoles and a shelf cornice, above which is the figure of a horse carved in wood and supported on brackets. The pub has eight bays, and a mix of sash and casement windows, those on the ground floor with segmental heads. The shop on the corner to the left has two bays, and contains shopfronts,and a yard entry. Inside the pub are late 19th-century fixtures and fittings.

== See also ==
- Grade II* listed buildings in the East Riding of Yorkshire
- Listed buildings in Beverley (central and northeast areas)
