= Norwood House, Beverley =

House in Beverley, East Riding of Yorkshire, England

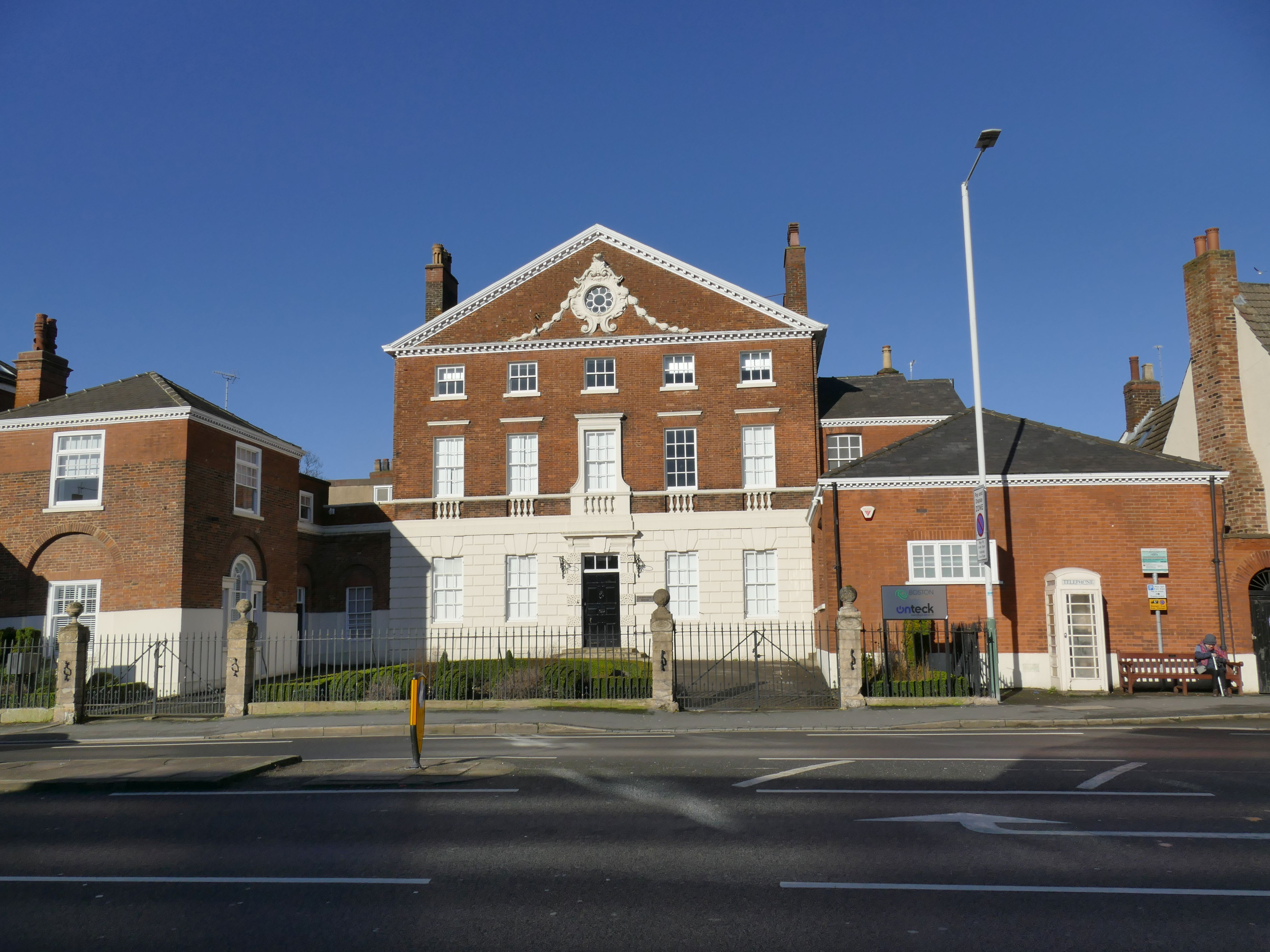
The building, in 2026

Norwood House is a historic building in Beverley, a town in the East Riding of Yorkshire, in England.

The house was built for Jonathan Midgley in the late 1760s. Around 1825, a library block was added. In 1908, it was converted into a boarding house for Beverley High School for Girls, the school buildings of which were erected in its grounds. In 1934, the house was converted into classrooms for the junior section of the school. It later became a training college, then in 2012 it was converted into a restaurant. The building was grade I listed in 1950, and is described by Historic England as "a remarkable house of modest dimensions".

The house is built of red brick with painted stone dressings and a hipped slate roof. It consists of a central block with three storeys and five bays, flanked by wings ending in pavilions. The ground floor of the main block is in rusticated stone, and contains a central doorway with a vermiculated rusticated surround, an architrave, a fanlight, consoles, a pulvinated frieze, three keystones and a cornice. Above it is a moulded sill band with balusters. The windows are sashes with gauged brick arches, those in the middle floor with cornices, and the central window with an architrave on stone plinths. Above is a bracketed cornice and a dentilled pediment containing a cartouche framing a bull's eye window. The pavilions protrude, the left with two storeys and the right with one storey. Inside, the original staircase survives, as do several chimneypieces, doorcases, and much plasterwork, probably by Joseph Page. The Rococo ceiling of the drawing room is particularly notable, based on a design by Colen Campbell for Compton Place.

The forecourt of the house is enclosed by wrought iron railings on a low stone wall. These contain two sets of wrought iron gates flanked by rusticated stone piers. Each pier has a moulded base, a square crowning block with an inset oval medallion and a ball finial. The gates, gate piers and railings were erected around 1780 and are collectively grade I listed.

== See also ==
- Grade I listed buildings in the East Riding of Yorkshire
- Listed buildings in Beverley (central and northeast areas)
