= Green Dragon (order) =

Mystical Tibetan or Japanese occult order

Green Dragon was a mystical Tibetan or Japanese occult order first mentioned at the beginning of the 20th century. The organization was mainly popularized through the book The Morning of the Magicians.

It is claimed that the order collaborated with Theosophical Society and Thule Society and influenced well-known secular figures in Europe as well as in Tibet and Japan. It is claimed that the Nazis discovered during the capture of Berlin in World War II were wearing Tibetan (or Kalmyk) garb.

Rumored members of the order include Peter Badmayev, empress Alexandra Feodorovna, Grigori Rasputin, and Karl Haushofer.

== See also ==
- Secret society
