= IAI Green Dragon =

Israeli loitering munition

Green Dragon
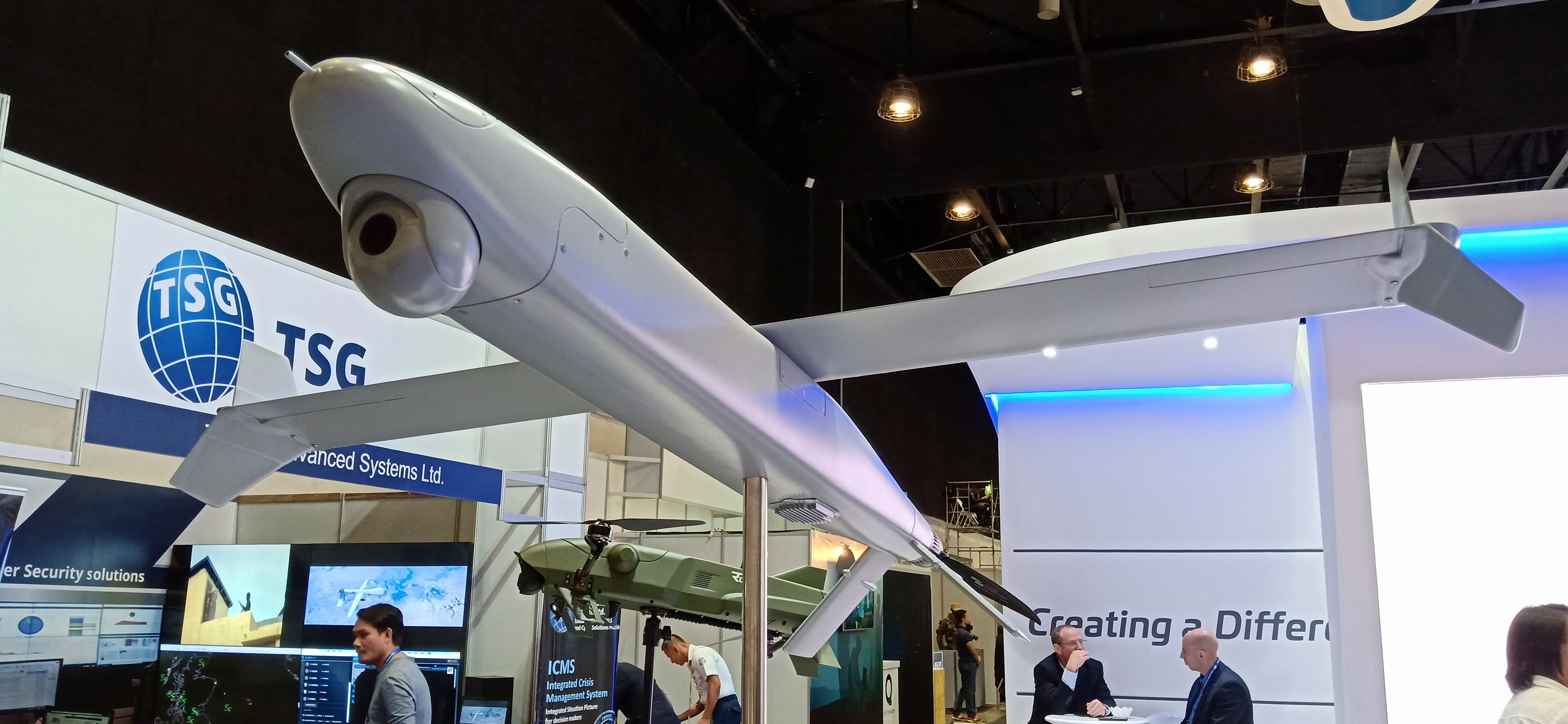
- Green Dragon Loitering Munition at ADAS

General information
- Type: Loitering Munition
- National origin: Israel
- Manufacturer: IAI
- Status: In service

The IAI Green Dragon is a loitering munition developed by the Israel Aerospace Industries.

== Design ==
The Green Dragon drone is low cost that can loiter for 1.5 hours and a range of 40–50 km. It is munition itself with 3 kg warhead that can approach the target silently and hit with the effect of < 1m.

Green Dragon can be launched from a small vehicle through a sealed 1.7-meter-long canister with 12-16 units. Each has 15 kg weight.

== Specifications ==
Data from Israel Aircraft Industries

General characteristics

- Crew: None
- Empty weight: 15 kg (33 lb)

Performance

- Range: 40 km (25 mi, 22 nmi)
- Endurance: 1 hours 30 minutes

Armament

- 3 kg warhead
