= Green Dragon, Beverley =

Pub in the East Riding of Yorkshire, England

Green Dragon
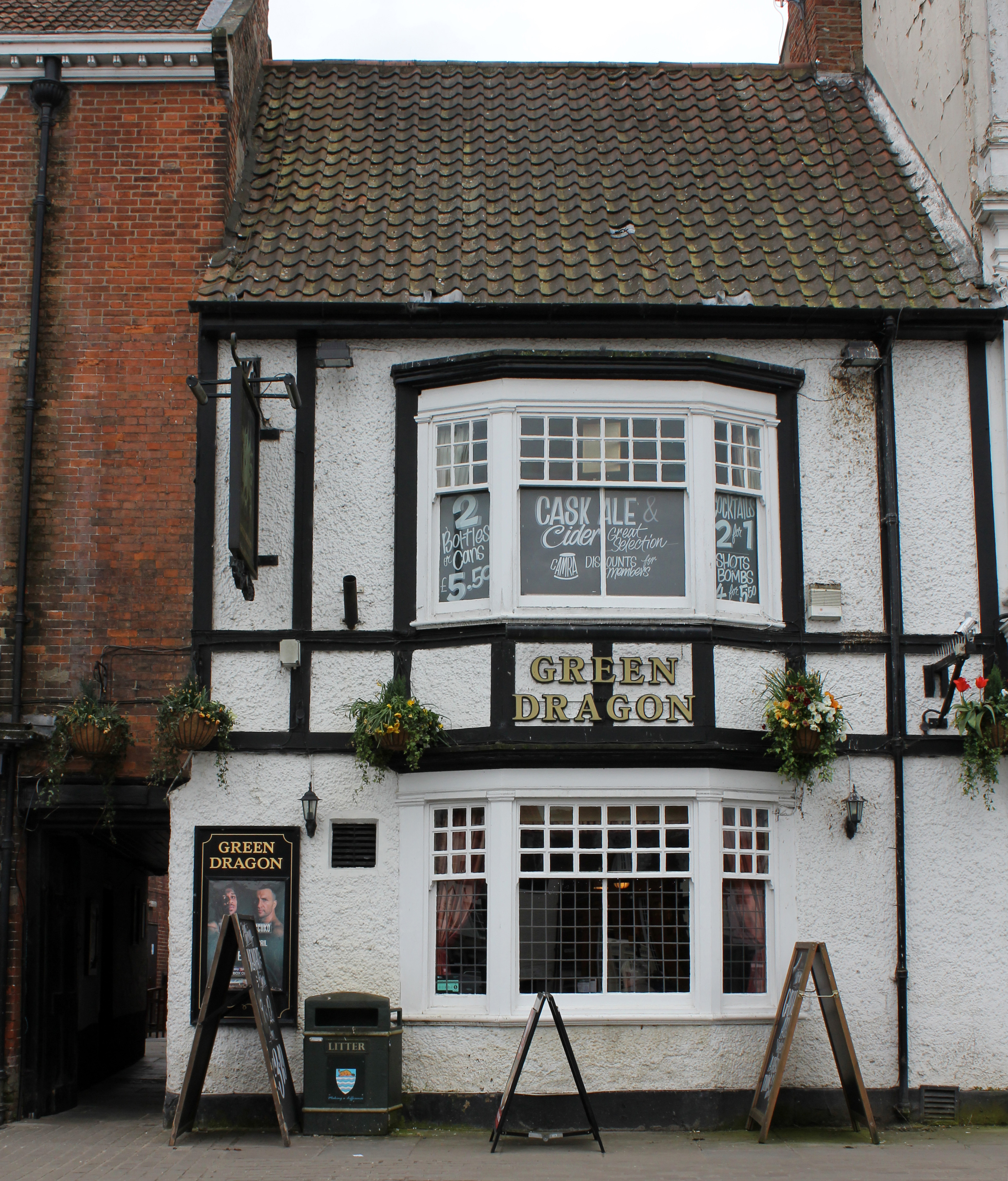
- The pub in 2017

- Location within East Riding of Yorkshire

General information
- Location: Saturday Market, Beverley, East Riding of Yorkshire, England
- Coordinates: 53°50′33″N 0°25′56″W
- Year built: 17th century or earlier (probable)
- Renovated: c. 1900 (altered); 2026 (refurbished)

Website
- thegreendragonbeverley.co.uk

Listed Building – Grade II
- Official name: 51, Saturday Market
- Designated: 2 July 1969
- Reference no.: 1083933

The Green Dragon is a historic pub on Saturday Market in Beverley, a town in the East Riding of Yorkshire, England.

The building was constructed in or before the 17th century. It was altered around 1900, becoming a pub, and was Grade II listed in 1969. The interior was refurbished in a modern style in 2026, following which the pub offers food, drinks and screens showing live sports.

The pub has a timber framed core. Externally it is roughcast, with applied timber framing and a steep pantile roof. There are two storeys and a front of one bay. On the front is a wide two-storey bay window, and a hanging sign with an ornamental iron bracket, and the entrance is through a passage on the left.

== See also ==
- Listed buildings in Beverley (central and northeast areas)
