= Corner House (Johannesburg) =

Historic building in South Africa

Coordinates: 26°12′20″S 28°02′24″E

Corner House (also known as Old Corner House) in the central business district of Johannesburg was the headquarters of one of the largest mining conglomerates in South Africa. This building's unique history earned it a declaration as a national heritage monument in 1999.

== Present ==
When the property developer Urban Ocean purchased the once prominent building on 77 Commissioner Street, on the corner with Simmonds Street, in 2003, it was in a state of disrepair. Currently, it houses a hotel, offices, apartments, restaurants, a spa, and a gymnasium.

== History ==
The first building on the site dated to 1886 and was made of corrugated iron and wood. It was known as "Beit's house" In 1893, a two-story edifice was built with luxury finishes such as balconies, cast iron bars, and a copper and green-tiled cupola. The Jameson Raid was said to have been planned here. Hermann Eckstein, Jr., hired the South African architectural firm Leck & Emley to build Johannesburg's first skyscraper of 10 stories. Upon the buildings completion in 1903 it was the largest and tallest commercial building in South Africa. It had an elevator and marble floors, and the offices were built with oak and African teak wood. In the basement were two large safes for the gold bars. Bullet holes in the front gable date to the 1922 Rand Rebellion. Rand Mines sold the building to Barclays Bank in 1964. The mining company then built a new headquarters nearby on the corner of Commissioner and Sauer Streets. At first, the new building was also known as Corner House.

== Name ==
The name Corner House comes not only from the location of the building but also from the founder of Rand Mines, namely Hermann Eckstein. Eckstein means "cornerstone" in German, reflecting the younger Eckstein's perception of himself as a cornerstone of the mining industry.

== Bibliography ==
- Palmer, Eve, and Jenkins, Geoffrey: The companion guide to South Africa. London: Collins, 1978. ISBN 0-00-211189-6
- Standard Encyclopaedia of Southern Africa, vol. 3. Cape Town: Nasou, 1971.
- Alan Patrick Cartwright, The Corner House: The Early History of Johannesburg, Purnell, 1965.
