= The Cornerhouse, Beverley =

Pub in Beverley, East Riding of Yorkshire, England

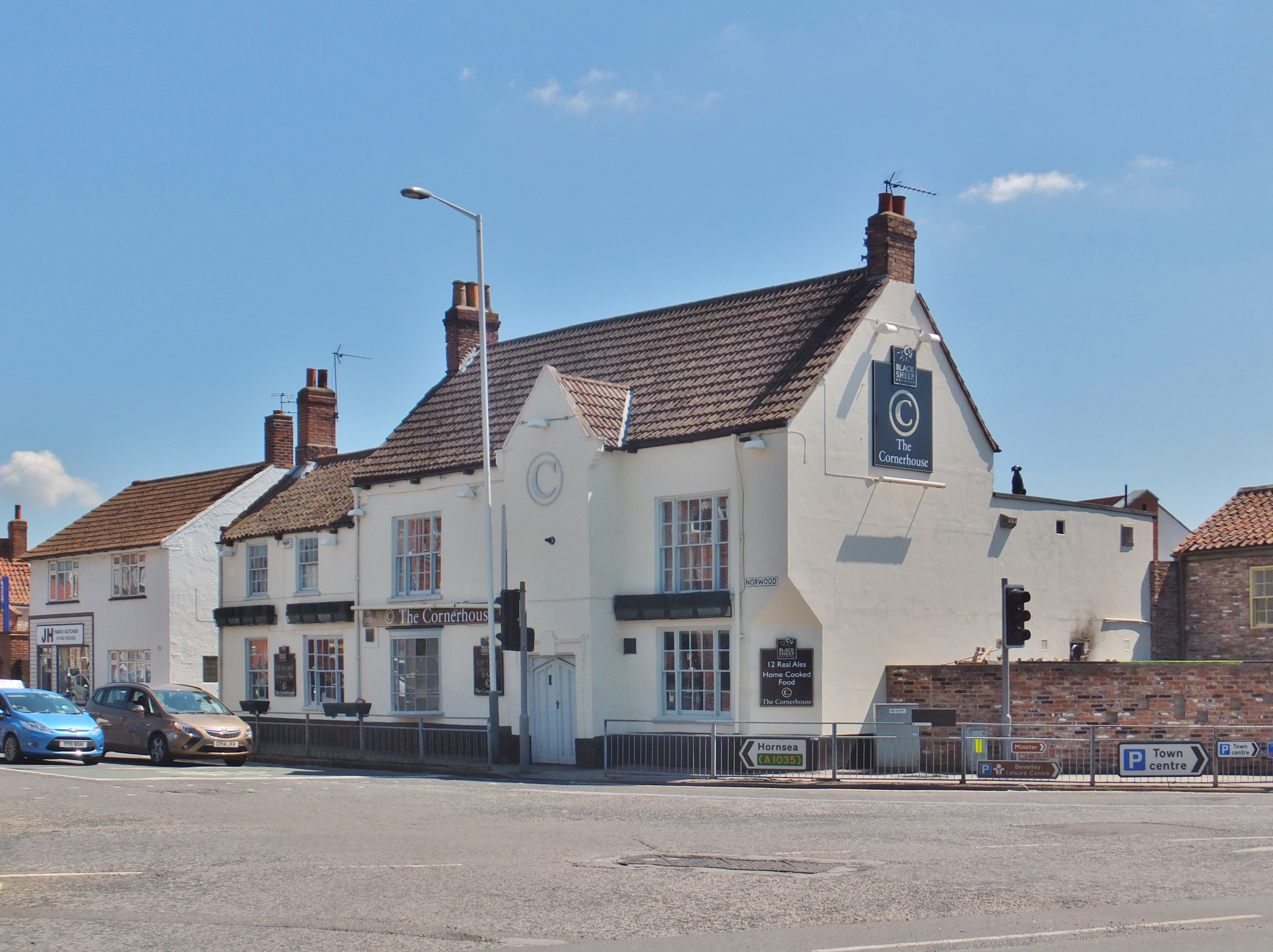
The pub, in 2015

The Cornerhouse is a historic pub in Beverley, a town in the East Riding of Yorkshire, in England.

The building largely dates from the 18th century, although it has earlier origins. It became a pub named the Valiant Soldier, then around 2000 was renamed "The Cornerhouse". In additions to drinks, the pub became known for its breakfasts and Sunday lunches. The building was grade II listed in 1987.

The pub is rendered and has a tile roof. There are two storeys and three bays, and a lower two-storey two-bay wing on the left. On the front is a plain doorway, above which is a gable with moulded kneelers. To its left is a bow window, and the other windows are sashes, some tripartite.

== See also ==
- Listed buildings in Beverley (central and northeast areas)
