= The Green Dragon, Flaunden =

The Green Dragon
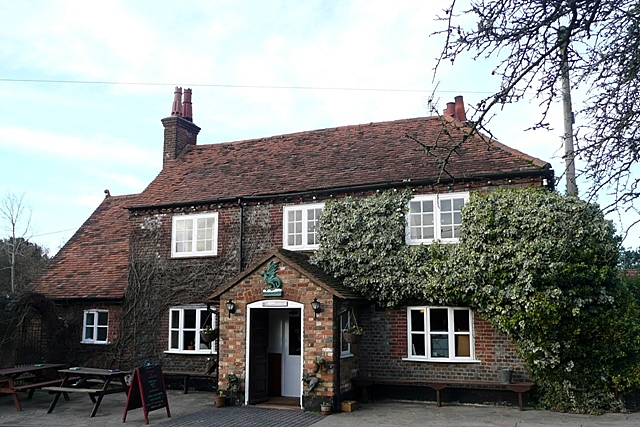
- The Green Dragon, Flaunden

General information
- Type: Public House
- Location: Flaunden, Hertfordshire
- Coordinates: 51°41′48.97″N 0°31′58.91″W
- Completed: c. 1700

Website
- The Green Dragon, Flaunden

The Green Dragon is a Grade II listed public house in Flaunden, Hertfordshire, England. The rear wing, a timber-framed structure, is the oldest part of the building and dates from the early 17th century.

== History ==
Formerly a residential house, what is now the Green Dragon was built in the early 17th Century, with the front range rebuilt in the early 19th Century and a side extension following in the 1980s. Much of the interior of the pub still contains the original timber frame, whilst the frontage is red brick, and the roof red tile. The tap room was built in 1838, whilst much of the rest of the pub has remained unchanged since the 19th century.

Among the Green Dragon's past clientele are two infamous figures, Nazi politician Joachim von Ribbentrop and Soviet spy Guy Burgess. Von Ribbentrop was a regular at the Green Dragon during the 1930s when he stayed at his weekend house in nearby Latimer during his time as the German Ambassador to the United Kingdom. Due to his involvement in the Nazi regime, von Ribbentrop would be sentenced to death as a result of the Nuremberg Trials. As a result of Hermann Göring committing suicide, von Ribbentrop became the first of those sentenced to be executed; he was hanged on 16 October 1946.

Burgess meanwhile often visited the Green Dragon when he stayed in Flaunden with his boyfriend, Peter Pollock, who lived in the Sharlowes farmhouse not far from the pub. Burgess would defect to the Soviet Union in May 1951, however, he is reported to have met with fellow Cambridge Five member Donald MacLean in the Tap Room of the Green Dragon the day prior to their defection.

The Green Dragon has been under the custodianship of one family for three generations, having been run by Bob and Ida Burgess since 1932, before being passed on to their daughter Barbara. During the late 1930s when Barbara was a child, she played in the garden with two young girls who were staying at Latimer House. Unbeknown to Barbara and her parents at the time, these two girls were the daughters of King George VI and would grow up to become Queen Elizabeth II and Princess Margaret.

== Present Day ==
The Green Dragon is listed on the Campaign for Real Ale's National Inventory of Historic Pub Interiors register, and is the only pub in Hertfordshire to be listed as having an "interior of national importance". This is due in large part to the snug being made up of two or more high backed settles, of which there are only a handful left in the country.

The pub prides itself on being a "focal point for traditional rural pursuits" and during the game season its "Tap Room" is visited by shooters following a day of sport.
