= 1991 King's Lynn and West Norfolk Borough Council election =

1991 English local election

1991 King's Lynn & West Norfolk Borough Council election
- 2 May 1991

All 60 seats to King's Lynn & West Norfolk Borough Council 31 seats needed for a majority
- Registered: 109,972
- Turnout: ~44.8%

	First party	Second party	Third party
Party	Conservative	Labour	Independent
Seats won	30	16	8
Seat change	▼16	▲5	▲7
Popular vote	22,045	22,616	9,821
Percentage	34.6%	35.5%	15.4%
Swing	▼17.5%	▲10.4%	▲13.5%
	Fourth party	Fifth party
Party	Liberal Democrats	Ind. Conservative
Seats won	5	1
Seat change	▲3	▲1
Popular vote	8,696	N/A (Note: The sole Independent Conservative candidate was elected unopposed.)
Percentage	13.7%	N/A
Swing	▼7.3%	N/A
- Winner of each seat at the 1991 King's Lynn & West Norfolk Borough Council election.
Council control before election
Conservative
Council control after election
No overall control

The 1991 King's Lynn & West Norfolk Borough Council election took place on 2 May 1991 to elect members of King's Lynn & West Norfolk Borough Council in England. This was on the same day as other local elections.

== Summary ==
=== Election result ===
1991 King's Lynn & West Norfolk Borough Council election
Party	Candidates	Seats	Gains	Losses	Net gain/loss	Seats %	Votes %	Votes	+/−
Conservative	44	30	3	18	▼15	50.0	33.5	20,674	–19.0
Labour	39	16	5	0	▲5	26.7	36.9	22,819	+12.7
Independent	13	8	8	2	▲6	13.3	13.0	8,040	+11.0
Liberal Democrats	21	5	5	3	▲3	8.3	15.8	9,756	–5.6
Ind. Conservative	1	1	1	0	▲1	1.7	N/A	N/A	N/A
Green	2	0	0	0	Steady	0.0	0.8	483	N/A

10 Conservatives, 1 Labour, 1 Liberal Democrat, and 1 Independent Conservative were elected unopposed.

== Ward results ==
Incumbent councillors standing for re-election are marked with an asterisk (*). Changes in seats do not take into account by-elections or defections.

=== Airfield ===
Airfield (2 seats)
Party	Candidate	Votes	%	±%
Conservative	J. Bagge*	721	59.0	
Conservative	J. Gooderson	678	55.4	
Labour	R. Everitt	418	34.2	
Green	M. Walker	272	22.2	
Turnout		~1,223	41.2	
Registered electors		2,968		
Conservative hold				
Conservative hold				

=== Burnham ===
Burnham
Party	Candidate	Votes	%	±%
Conservative	J. Thompson	Unopposed		
Registered electors		1,376		
Conservative hold				

=== Chase ===
Chase (2 seats)
Party	Candidate	Votes	%	±%
Labour	D. Berry	629	42.4	
Labour	L. Bunn	583	39.3	
Conservative	E. Nockolds*	562	37.9	
Conservative	B. Barton*	525	35.4	
Liberal Democrats	N. Brown	258	17.4	
Liberal Democrats	M. Standeven	200	13.5	
Turnout		~1,482	46.4	
Registered electors		3,193		
Labour gain from Conservative				
Labour gain from Conservative				

=== Clenchwarton ===
Clenchwarton
Party	Candidate	Votes	%	±%
Liberal Democrats	P. Brandon	483	50.6	
Conservative	C. Garrod	305	32.0	
Labour	P. Snape	166	17.4	
Majority		178	18.6	
Turnout		954	53.6	
Registered electors		1,779		
Liberal Democrats gain from Conservative		Swing		

=== Creake ===
Creake
Party	Candidate	Votes	%	±%
Conservative	M. Horsbrugh*	443	47.2	
Labour	D. Ford	319	34.0	
Liberal Democrats	L. Goros	177	18.8	
Majority		124	13.2	
Turnout		939	61.7	
Registered electors		1,528		
Conservative hold		Swing		

=== Denton ===
Denton (3 seats)
Party	Candidate	Votes	%	±%
Conservative	M. Storey*	Unopposed		
Liberal Democrats	D. Buckton	Unopposed		
Conservative	C. Sharpe*	Unopposed		
Registered electors		4,126		
Conservative hold				
Liberal Democrats gain from Conservative				
Conservative hold				

=== Denver ===
Denver
Party	Candidate	Votes	%	±%
Conservative	H. Blakey*	Unopposed		
Registered electors		1,146		
Conservative hold				

=== Dersingham ===
Dersingham (2 seats)
Party	Candidate	Votes	%	±%
Liberal Democrats	P. Burall	1,090	33.1	
Conservative	I. Stockwell*	970	29.4	
Conservative	R. Hipkin*	932	28.3	
Independent	D. Lendon	678	20.6	
Labour	P. Warner	558	16.9	
Turnout		~2,431	59.1	
Registered electors		4,111		
Liberal Democrats gain from Conservative				
Conservative hold				

=== Docking ===
Docking
Party	Candidate	Votes	%	±%
Labour	M. Howard*	471	59.8	
Conservative	T. Finbow	317	40.2	
Majority		154	19.6	
Turnout		788	54.3	
Registered electors		1,459		
Labour hold		Swing		

=== Downham Market ===
Downham Market (3 seats)
Party	Candidate	Votes	%	±%
Independent	T. Taylor	1,481	34.6	
Independent	L. Brown*	1,290	30.1	
Conservative	H. Rose*	1,259	29.4	
Conservative	R. Baker	1,074	25.1	
Labour	M. Stewart	783	18.3	
Labour	J. Toye	622	14.5	
Liberal Democrats	A. Kenedler	552	12.9	
Green	P. Arnold	211	4.9	
Turnout		~2,969	49.5	
Registered electors		5,998		
Independent gain from Conservative				
Independent gain from Conservative				
Conservative hold				

=== Emneth ===
Emneth
Party	Candidate	Votes	%	±%
Ind. Conservative	N. Tarrington*	Unopposed		
Registered electors		1,699		
Ind. Conservative gain from Independent				

=== Gayton ===
Gayton
Party	Candidate	Votes	%	±%
Conservative	I. Major*	520	63.4	
Liberal Democrats	P. Gray	300	36.6	
Majority		220	26.8	
Turnout		820	51.3	
Registered electors		1,600		
Conservative hold		Swing		

=== Gaywood Central ===
Gaywood Central (2 seats)
Party	Candidate	Votes	%	±%
Conservative	A. Haigh*	660	44.1	
Conservative	B. Barlow	590	39.5	
Liberal Democrats	J. Loveless*	558	37.3	
Labour	N. Ashley	524	35.0	
Labour	D. Collis	398	26.6	
Turnout		~1,495	46.5	
Registered electors		3,215		
Conservative gain from Liberal Democrats				
Conservative gain from Liberal Democrats				

=== Gaywood North ===
Gaywood North (3 seats)
Party	Candidate	Votes	%	±%
Independent	A. Daubney*	883	41.5	
Independent	M. Langwade	863	40.5	
Independent	T. Mickleburgh*	828	38.9	
Labour	P. Barlow	769	36.1	
Labour	W. Davison	680	31.9	
Labour	S. Walters	672	31.6	
Liberal Democrats	S. Davies	465	21.8	
Liberal Democrats	R. Bellamy	443	20.8	
Liberal Democrats	G. Fredericks	359	16.9	
Turnout		~2,129	41.5	
Registered electors		5,129		
Independent gain from Conservative				
Independent gain from Conservative				
Independent gain from Conservative				

=== Gaywood South ===
Gaywood South (3 seats)
Party	Candidate	Votes	%	±%
Labour	A. Burch*	1,168	66.3	
Labour	B. Burch*	1,151	65.4	
Labour	M. Wilkinson*	1,146	65.0	
Independent	P. Bacon	451	25.6	
Turnout		~1,762	33.9	
Registered electors		5,198		
Labour hold				
Labour hold				
Labour hold				

=== Grimston ===
Grimston
Party	Candidate	Votes	%	±%
Liberal Democrats	H. Fredericks	624	59.1	
Conservative	K. Roberts*	431	40.9	
Majority		193	18.2	
Turnout		1,055	49.2	
Registered electors		2,164		
Liberal Democrats gain from Conservative		Swing		

=== Heacham ===
Heacham (2 seats)
Party	Candidate	Votes	%	±%
Conservative	P. Hammond	924	45.3	
Labour	A. Evans	909	44.6	
Conservative	V. Stapley*	883	43.3	
Labour	M. Wilson	644	31.6	
Liberal Democrats	D. Standeven	298	14.6	
Turnout		~2,040	49.4	
Registered electors		4,130		
Conservative hold				
Labour gain from Conservative				

=== Hunstanton ===
Hunstanton (2 seats)
Party	Candidate	Votes	%	±%
Conservative	C. Matkin*	1,153	52.9	
Conservative	M. Wood*	1,091	50.0	
Labour	B. Devlin	828	38.0	
Labour	P. Ringwood	640	29.4	
Liberal Democrats	T. Hyde-Smith	216	9.9	
Liberal Democrats	J. Gough	203	9.3	
Turnout		~2,180	49.9	
Registered electors		4,369		
Conservative hold				
Conservative hold				

=== Lynn Central ===
Lynn Central (2 seats)
Party	Candidate	Votes	%	±%
Conservative	J. Cook*	530	57.9	
Conservative	J. Mickleburgh*	476	52.0	
Labour	J. Roper	472	51.5	
Labour	L. Wilkinson	428	46.7	
Turnout		~916	39.0	
Registered electors		2,349		
Conservative hold				
Conservative hold				

=== Lynn North ===
Lynn North (2 seats)
Party	Candidate	Votes	%	±%
Labour	F. Juniper*	782	76.6	
Labour	P. Bantoft	676	66.2	
Conservative	I. Lockhart	168	16.5	
Turnout		~1,021	33.8	
Registered electors		3,020		
Labour hold				
Labour hold				

=== Lynn South West ===
Lynn South West (2 seats)
Party	Candidate	Votes	%	±%
Labour	D. Benefer*	877	74.4	
Labour	P. Griggs*	803	68.1	
Conservative	C. Mahoney	277	23.5	
Turnout		~1,179	41.4	
Registered electors		2,847		
Labour hold				
Labour hold				

=== Mershe Lande ===
Mershe Lande
Party	Candidate	Votes	%	±%
Independent	H. Goose*	491	59.4	
Labour	J. Bantoft	336	40.6	
Majority		155	18.8	
Turnout		827	44.0	
Registered electors		1,887		
Independent gain from Conservative		Swing		

=== Middleton ===
Middleton
Party	Candidate	Votes	%	±%
Conservative	N. White	Unopposed		
Registered electors		1,702		
Conservative hold				

=== North Coast ===
North Coast
Party	Candidate	Votes	%	±%
Conservative	S. Oliver	587	60.1	
Independent	R. Gibbs*	389	39.9	
Majority		198	20.2	
Turnout		976	50.4	
Registered electors		1,964		
Conservative hold		Swing		

=== Priory ===
Priory
Party	Candidate	Votes	%	±%
Labour	G. Shelton	394	55.5	
Independent	M. Valentine	316	44.5	
Majority		78	11.0	
Turnout		710	57.7	
Registered electors		1,241		
Labour gain from Conservative		Swing		

=== Rudham ===
Rudham
Party	Candidate	Votes	%	±%
Labour	B. Seaman*	360	55.5	
Liberal Democrats	L. Parnell	173	26.7	
Conservative	A. Bews	116	17.9	
Majority		187	28.8	
Turnout		649	60.0	
Registered electors		1,081		
Labour hold		Swing		

=== Snettisham ===
Snettisham
Party	Candidate	Votes	%	±%
Independent	G. Pratt	469	50.6	
Labour	E. Howard	458	49.4	
Majority		11	1.2	
Turnout		927	47.0	
Registered electors		1,995		
Independent gain from Conservative		Swing		

=== Spellowfields ===
Spellowfields (2 seats)
Party	Candidate	Votes	%	±%
Liberal Democrats	M. Walker	606	50.0	
Conservative	J. Howling*	550	45.4	
Independent	L. Nunn	483	39.9	
Liberal Democrats	T. Brandon	412	34.0	
Turnout		~1,211	37.2	
Registered electors		3,255		
Liberal Democrats gain from Conservative				
Conservative hold				

=== St. Lawrence ===
St. Lawrence
Party	Candidate	Votes	%	±%
Conservative	W. Garner*	408	56.4	
Labour	D. Hall	315	43.6	
Majority		93	12.8	
Turnout		723	42.7	
Registered electors		1,697		
Conservative hold		Swing		

=== St. Margarets ===
St. Margarets
Party	Candidate	Votes	%	±%
Labour	P. Richards	417	50.7	
Conservative	J. Dutton	222	27.0	
Independent	M. Buckley*	184	22.4	
Majority		195	23.7	
Turnout		823	47.6	
Registered electors		1,735		
Labour gain from Conservative		Swing		

=== Ten Mile ===
Ten Mile
Party	Candidate	Votes	%	±%
Labour	J. Simper*	Unopposed		
Registered electors		1,826		
Labour hold				

=== The Walpoles ===
The Walpoles
Party	Candidate	Votes	%	±%
Conservative	E. Kemp*	Unopposed		
Registered electors		2,105		
Conservative hold				

=== The Woottons ===
The Woottons (2 seats)
Party	Candidate	Votes	%	±%
Conservative	L. Dutton*	1,322	54.5	
Conservative	R. Spencer*	1,253	51.7	
Liberal Democrats	A. Evans	663	27.3	
Liberal Democrats	A. Bolton	616	25.4	
Labour	S. Hayes	440	18.1	
Labour	A. Tebbutt	419	17.3	
Turnout		~2,471	51.6	
Registered electors		4,792		
Conservative hold				
Conservative hold				

=== Upwell, Outwell & Delph ===
Upwell, Outwell & Delph (2 seats)
Party	Candidate	Votes	%	±%
Conservative	J. Beckett*	882	43.0	
Independent	A. Feary	753	36.7	
Conservative	P. Walker	548	26.7	
Labour	R. Parnell	416	20.3	
Independent	J. Liddall	262	12.8	
Turnout		~1,669	38.6	
Registered electors		4,325		
Conservative hold				
Independent gain from Conservative				

=== Valley Hill ===
Valley Hill
Party	Candidate	Votes	%	±%
Labour	J. Tilbury*	664	66.5	
Conservative	D. Clark	335	33.5	
Majority		329	32.9	
Turnout		999	53.0	
Registered electors		1,890		
Labour hold		Swing		

=== Watlington ===
Watlington
Party	Candidate	Votes	%	±%
Conservative	N. Pond*	Unopposed		
Registered electors		1,979		
Conservative hold				

=== West Walton ===
West Walton
Party	Candidate	Votes	%	±%
Conservative	R. Groom	Unopposed		
Registered electors		1,220		
Conservative gain from Independent				

=== West Winch ===
West Winch
Party	Candidate	Votes	%	±%
Conservative	G. Daws*	Unopposed		
Registered electors		2,162		
Conservative hold				

=== Wiggenhall ===
Wiggenhall
Party	Candidate	Votes	%	±%
Conservative	Y. Turrell*	333	54.2	
Labour	S. Hall	281	45.8	
Majority		52	8.4	
Turnout		614	42.0	
Registered electors		1,465		
Conservative hold		Swing		

=== Wissey ===
Wissey
Party	Candidate	Votes	%	±%
Conservative	T. Manley	Unopposed		
Registered electors		1,875		
Conservative hold				
