= 1991 North Bedfordshire Borough Council election =

North Bedfordshire Borough Council election

The 1991 North Bedfordshire Borough Council election took place on 2 May 1991 to elect members of North Bedfordshire Borough Council in England. This was on the same day as other local elections.

Prior to the election, two councillors quit the Conservative group to sit as Independents.

== Summary ==
=== Election result ===
1991 North Bedfordshire Borough Council election
| Party | This election | | | Full council | | | This election | | |
| Party | Seats | Net | Seats % | Other | Total | Total % | Votes | Votes % | +/− |
|---|---|---|---|---|---|---|---|---|---|
| Conservative | 10 | ▼1 | 58.8 | 11 | 21 | 40.4 | 15,241 | 42.9 | +6.3 |
| Labour | 4 | ▲1 | 23.5 | 11 | 15 | 28.8 | 11,250 | 31.7 | –6.4 |
| Liberal Democrats | 3 | Steady | 17.6 | 10 | 13 | 25.0 | 9,046 | 25.5 | +1.5 |
| Independent | 0 | Steady | 0.0 | 3 | 3 | 5.8 | N/A | N/A | –0.2 |

== Ward results ==
=== Brickhill ===
Brickhill
| Party | Candidate | Votes | % | ±% |
|---|---|---|---|---|
| Liberal Democrats | R. Waterhouse | 1,606 | 49.8 | +11.8 |
| Conservative | J. Wilson | 1,383 | 42.9 | −7.9 |
| Labour | D. Tydings | 236 | 7.3 | –3.9 |
| Majority | | 223 | 6.9 | |
| Turnout | | 3,225 | 54.4 | |
| Registered electors | | 5,926 | | |
| Liberal Democrats gain from Conservative | | Swing | | |

=== Bromham ===
Bromham
| Party | Candidate | Votes | % | ±% |
|---|---|---|---|---|
| Conservative | P. Luddington | 1,398 | 75.3 | +5.2 |
| Liberal Democrats | D. Sawyer | 256 | 13.8 | −9.9 |
| Labour | T. Carroll | 202 | 10.9 | +4.6 |
| Majority | | 1,142 | 61.5 | |
| Turnout | | 1,856 | 48.6 | |
| Registered electors | | 3,821 | | |
| Conservative hold | | Swing | | |

=== Castle ===
Castle
| Party | Candidate | Votes | % | ±% |
|---|---|---|---|---|
| Conservative | M. Dewar* | 997 | 42.7 | −7.5 |
| Labour | R. Charles | 791 | 33.9 | –0.8 |
| Liberal Democrats | P. Chiswell | 546 | 23.4 | +8.2 |
| Majority | | 206 | 8.8 | |
| Turnout | | 2,334 | 53.1 | |
| Registered electors | | 4,394 | | |
| Conservative hold | | Swing | | |

=== Cauldwell ===
Cauldwell
| Party | Candidate | Votes | % | ±% |
|---|---|---|---|---|
| Labour | W. Astle* | 1,366 | 68.5 | +14.7 |
| Conservative | R. Pal | 331 | 16.6 | −17.6 |
| Liberal Democrats | A. Gerard | 296 | 14.9 | +4.4 |
| Majority | | 1,035 | 51.9 | |
| Turnout | | 1,993 | 36.2 | |
| Registered electors | | 5,505 | | |
| Labour hold | | Swing | | |

=== Clapham ===
Clapham
| Party | Candidate | Votes | % | ±% |
|---|---|---|---|---|
| Conservative | F. Sparrow* | 604 | 50.6 | +6.3 |
| Labour | L. Lumsden | 343 | 28.7 | +13.2 |
| Liberal Democrats | J. Crofts | 247 | 20.7 | –19.4 |
| Majority | | 261 | 21.9 | |
| Turnout | | 1,194 | 41.6 | |
| Registered electors | | 2,868 | | |
| Conservative hold | | Swing | | |

=== De Parys ===
De Parys
| Party | Candidate | Votes | % | ±% |
|---|---|---|---|---|
| Conservative | J. Barley* | 1,286 | 44.9 | −4.3 |
| Liberal Democrats | D. Smyly | 1,278 | 44.6 | +5.1 |
| Labour | K. Buckles | 300 | 10.5 | –0.8 |
| Majority | | 8 | 0.3 | |
| Turnout | | 2,864 | 51.5 | |
| Registered electors | | 5,566 | | |
| Conservative hold | | Swing | | |

=== Goldington ===
Goldington
| Party | Candidate | Votes | % | ±% |
|---|---|---|---|---|
| Liberal Democrats | A. Ruffin | 1,153 | 46.2 | +1.7 |
| Labour | R. Warner | 933 | 37.4 | +8.1 |
| Conservative | H. Bushell | 411 | 16.5 | –9.7 |
| Majority | | 220 | 8.8 | |
| Turnout | | 2,497 | 47.1 | |
| Registered electors | | 5,304 | | |
| Liberal Democrats hold | | Swing | | |

=== Great Barford ===
Great Barford
| Party | Candidate | Votes | % | ±% |
|---|---|---|---|---|
| Conservative | C. Ellis | 576 | 62.2 | –14.6 |
| Liberal Democrats | J. Dixon | 350 | 37.8 | +29.9 |
| Majority | | 226 | 24.4 | |
| Turnout | | 926 | 47.5 | |
| Registered electors | | 1,951 | | |
| Conservative hold | | Swing | | |

=== Harpur ===
Harpur
| Party | Candidate | Votes | % | ±% |
|---|---|---|---|---|
| Labour | J. Dove | 1,244 | 54.8 | +12.2 |
| Conservative | S. Halse | 815 | 35.9 | −13.6 |
| Liberal Democrats | C. Hall | 212 | 9.3 | +1.3 |
| Majority | | 429 | 18.9 | |
| Turnout | | 2,271 | 40.5 | |
| Registered electors | | 5,608 | | |
| Labour gain from Conservative | | Swing | | |

=== Kempston East ===
Kempston East
| Party | Candidate | Votes | % | ±% |
|---|---|---|---|---|
| Conservative | C. Attenborough* | 1,412 | 45.1 | −9.3 |
| Labour | S. Lehal | 1,409 | 45.0 | +11.6 |
| Liberal Democrats | C. Green | 313 | 10.0 | −2.2 |
| Majority | | 3 | 0.1 | |
| Turnout | | 3,134 | 43.8 | |
| Registered electors | | 7,163 | | |
| Conservative hold | | Swing | | |

=== Kempston Rural ===
Kempston Rural
| Party | Candidate | Votes | % | ±% |
|---|---|---|---|---|
| Conservative | M. Michaelmas | 677 | 65.4 | –6.2 |
| Liberal Democrats | P. Welsh | 358 | 34.6 | +19.8 |
| Majority | | 319 | 30.8 | |
| Turnout | | 1,035 | 50.1 | |
| Registered electors | | 2,067 | | |
| Conservative hold | | Swing | | |

=== Kempston West ===
Kempston West
| Party | Candidate | Votes | % | ±% |
|---|---|---|---|---|
| Conservative | E. Joy* | 1,199 | 47.9 | −7.8 |
| Labour | J. Tye | 1,072 | 42.8 | +9.8 |
| Liberal Democrats | V. Hawke | 234 | 9.3 | −2.0 |
| Majority | | 127 | 5.1 | |
| Turnout | | 2,505 | 40.6 | |
| Registered electors | | 6,173 | | |
| Conservative hold | | Swing | | |

=== Kingsbrook ===
Kingsbrook
| Party | Candidate | Votes | % | ±% |
|---|---|---|---|---|
| Labour | F. Garrick | 1,133 | 58.1 | +21.3 |
| Conservative | J. Mingay | 569 | 29.2 | +9.9 |
| Liberal Democrats | L. Ames | 249 | 12.8 | −31.1 |
| Majority | | 564 | 28.9 | |
| Turnout | | 1,951 | 36.9 | |
| Registered electors | | 5,294 | | |
| Labour gain from Liberal Democrats | | Swing | | |

=== Putnoe ===
Putnoe
| Party | Candidate | Votes | % | ±% |
|---|---|---|---|---|
| Liberal Democrats | I. Hedley | 1,265 | 47.1 | +6.8 |
| Conservative | J. Moore* | 1,246 | 46.4 | −5.5 |
| Labour | O. Wesley | 176 | 6.6 | –1.2 |
| Majority | | 19 | 0.7 | |
| Turnout | | 2,687 | 48.6 | |
| Registered electors | | 5,532 | | |
| Liberal Democrats gain from Conservative | | Swing | | |

=== Queens Park ===
Queens Park
| Party | Candidate | Votes | % | ±% |
|---|---|---|---|---|
| Labour | M. Khan | 1,264 | 54.9 | –8.3 |
| Conservative | R. Hughes | 711 | 30.9 | +4.7 |
| Liberal Democrats | J. Cunningham | 329 | 14.3 | +3.7 |
| Majority | | 553 | 24.0 | |
| Turnout | | 2,304 | 43.0 | |
| Registered electors | | 5,356 | | |
| Labour hold | | Swing | | |

=== Sharnbrook ===
Sharnbrook
| Party | Candidate | Votes | % | ±% |
|---|---|---|---|---|
| Conservative | R. Pearson* | 646 | 64.2 | –1.2 |
| Labour | J. Home | 206 | 20.5 | +10.6 |
| Liberal Democrats | K. Jones | 155 | 15.4 | –9.3 |
| Majority | | 440 | 43.7 | |
| Turnout | | 1,007 | 50.0 | |
| Registered electors | | 2,013 | | |
| Conservative hold | | Swing | | |

=== Wootton ===
Wootton
| Party | Candidate | Votes | % | ±% |
|---|---|---|---|---|
| Conservative | E. Finch | 980 | 55.9 | +10.6 |
| Labour | G. Ware | 575 | 32.8 | –8.5 |
| Liberal Democrats | J. Brockett | 199 | 11.3 | +3.3 |
| Majority | | 405 | 23.1 | |
| Turnout | | 1,754 | 48.3 | |
| Registered electors | | 3,629 | | |
| Conservative hold | | Swing | | |
