= 1991 Welwyn Hatfield District Council election =

Welwyn Hatfield District Council election

The 1991 Welwyn Hatfield District Council election took place on 2 May 1991 to elect members of Welwyn Hatfield District Council in England. This was on the same day as other local elections.

The council was elected on partial new ward boundaries, leading to some wards electing all of their councillors, while other wards only elected one councillor as normal. The total number of councillors increased by 4 from 43 to 47.

== Summary ==
=== Election result ===
1991 Welwyn Hatfield District Council election
Party	This election			Full council			This election		
Party	Seats	Net	Seats %	Other	Total	Total %	Votes	Votes %	+/−
Labour	11	▲2	40.7	15	26	55.3	21,993	39.2	–5.2
Conservative	16	▲2	59.3	5	21	44.7	26,762	47.7	+10.3
Liberal Democrats	0	Steady	0.0	0	0	0.0	6,604	11.8	–1.3
Green	0	Steady	0.0	0	0	0.0	455	0.8	–3.3
Independent Labour	0	Steady	0.0	0	0	0.0	280	0.5	N/A
