= 1991 Forest Heath District Council election =

Forest Heath District Council election

The 1991 Forest Heath District Council election took place on 2 May 1991 to elect members of Forest Heath District Council in England. This was on the same day as other local elections.

== Summary ==
1991 Forest Heath District Council election
Party	Seats	Gains	Losses	Net gain/loss	Seats %	Votes %	Votes	+/−
Conservative	12			▼2		33.7	6,653	-18.6
Independent	9			Steady		32.2	6,361	+9.4
Liberal Democrats	3			▲3		13.4	2,655	+11.8
Labour	1			▲1		20.7	4,097	-0.2
Independent Liberal	0			▼1	0.0	N/A	N/A	-2.3
Ind. Social Democrat	0			▼1	0.0	N/A	N/A	N/A
