= 1991 Worthing Borough Council election =

1991 English local election

- 2 May 1991

12 out of 36 seats to Worthing Borough Council 19 seats needed for a majority

	First party	Second party
Party	Conservative	Liberal Democrats
Last election	27 seats, 44.7%	9 seats, 34.1%
Seats won	7	5
Seats after	24	12
Seat change	▼3	▲3
Popular vote	15,203	13,580
Percentage	45.8%	40.9%
Swing	▲1.1%	▲6.8%
Council control before election
Conservative
Council control after election
Conservative

The 1991 Worthing Borough Council election took place on 2 May 1991 to elect members of Worthing Borough Council in West Sussex, England. This was on the same day as other local elections.

== Summary ==
=== Election result ===
1991 Worthing Borough Council election
Party	This election				Full council			This election		
Party	Candidates	Seats	Net	Seats %	Other	Total	Total %	Votes	Votes %	+/−
Conservative	{{{candidates}}}	7	▼3	58.3	17	24	66.7	15,203	45.8	+1.1
Liberal Democrats	{{{candidates}}}	5	▲3	41.7	7	12	33.3	13,580	40.9	+6.8
Labour	{{{candidates}}}	0	Steady	0.0	0	0	0.0	3,564	10.7	–5.2
Green	{{{candidates}}}	0	Steady	0.0	0	0	0.0	720	2.2	–1.2
Independent	{{{candidates}}}	0	Steady	0.0	0	0	0.0	156	0.5	N/A

== Ward results ==
=== Broadwater ===
Broadwater
Party	Candidate	Votes	%	±%
Liberal Democrats	A. Clare*	1,556	63.8	+1.0
Conservative	M. Wilson	663	27.2	+1.0
Labour	A. Mann	219	9.0	N/A
Majority		893	36.6	±0.0
Turnout		2,438	37.7	–3.4
Registered electors		6,468		
Liberal Democrats hold		Swing	0.0	

=== Castle ===
Castle
Party	Candidate	Votes	%	±%
Liberal Democrats	S. Pye	1,397	47.6	+5.4
Conservative	J. Orridge*	1,010	34.4	+2.7
Labour	K. Fisher	527	18.0	–8.1
Majority		387	13.2	+2.7
Turnout		2,934	47.5	–3.9
Registered electors		6,191		
Liberal Democrats gain from Conservative		Swing	▲1.4	

=== Central ===
Central
Party	Candidate	Votes	%	±%
Liberal Democrats	I. Stuart	1,332	57.7	+15.3
Conservative	R. Price*	801	34.7	+1.6
Labour	J. Del Rio Fernandez	176	7.6	–6.3
Majority		531	23.0	+13.7
Turnout		2,309	39.6	–1.5
Registered electors		5,838		
Liberal Democrats gain from Conservative		Swing	▲6.9	

=== Durrington ===
Durrington
Party	Candidate	Votes	%	±%
Conservative	J. Cotton*	1,422	43.9	+2.5
Liberal Democrats	R. Smytherman	1,227	37.9	+3.8
Labour	B. Perigoe	302	9.3	–6.1
Green	J. Hughes	289	8.9	–0.2
Majority		195	6.0	–0.7
Turnout		3,240	43.6	+0.2
Registered electors		7,431		
Conservative hold		Swing	▼0.4	

=== Gaisford ===
Gaisford
Party	Candidate	Votes	%	±%
Liberal Democrats	P. Bennett*	1,249	47.3	+3.5
Conservative	G. Thompson	1,054	40.0	+3.6
Labour	D. Henbrey	179	6.8	–5.0
Independent	P. Kennard	156	5.9	N/A
Majority		195	7.4	–0.1
Turnout		2,638	41.9	–2.8
Registered electors		6,304		
Liberal Democrats hold		Swing	▼0.1	

=== Goring ===
Goring
Party	Candidate	Votes	%	±%
Conservative	B. Lynn*	1,990	61.7	+1.2
Liberal Democrats	D. Whyberd	849	26.3	+13.1
Labour	O. Rand	196	6.1	–7.3
Green	D. Colkett	192	5.9	N/A
Majority		1,141	35.4	–11.7
Turnout		3,227	47.9	–1.3
Registered electors		6,759		
Conservative hold		Swing	▼6.0	

=== Heene ===
Heene
Party	Candidate	Votes	%	±%
Conservative	H. Piggott*	1,418	57.2	–2.8
Liberal Democrats	E. Lipscombe	819	33.1	+9.1
Labour	J. Hammond	241	9.7	–6.3
Majority		599	24.2	–11.9
Turnout		2,478	36.9	–3.6
Registered electors		6,728		
Conservative hold		Swing	▼6.0	

=== Marine ===
Marine
Party	Candidate	Votes	%	±%
Conservative	J. Carne	1,580	59.8	–3.1
Liberal Democrats	R. Selley	611	23.1	+2.8
Green	L. Colkett	239	9.0	N/A
Labour	D. Haworth	211	8.0	–8.7
Majority		969	36.7	–5.9
Turnout		2,641	42.4	–2.8
Registered electors		6,234		
Conservative hold		Swing	▼3.0	

=== Offington ===
Offington
Party	Candidate	Votes	%	±%
Conservative	C. Scott*	1,491	50.1	–2.0
Liberal Democrats	E. Mardell	1,357	45.6	+7.5
Labour	C. Tempest	126	4.2	–5.6
Majority		134	4.5	–9.5
Turnout		2,974	47.7	+1.5
Registered electors		6,251		
Conservative hold		Swing	▼4.8	

=== Salvington ===
Salvington
Party	Candidate	Votes	%	±%
Conservative	H. Braden*	1,676	58.8	+3.5
Liberal Democrats	V. McLuskie	917	32.2	+5.4
Labour	M. Dowson	258	9.0	–8.9
Majority		759	26.6	–1.9
Turnout		2,851	43.9	–1.8
Registered electors		6,507		
Conservative hold		Swing	▼1.0	

=== Selden ===
Selden
Party	Candidate	Votes	%	±%
Conservative	A. Craig	992	38.2	+0.1
Labour	J. Deen	910	35.1	+0.4
Liberal Democrats	M. Moore	692	26.7	+2.7
Majority		82	3.2	–0.2
Turnout		2,594	41.5	–0.9
Registered electors		6,245		
Conservative hold		Swing	▼0.2	

=== Tarring ===
Tarring
Party	Candidate	Votes	%	±%
Liberal Democrats	J. Lovell	1,574	54.3	+13.3
Conservative	E. Giddins	1,106	38.2	+2.2
Labour	C. Dove	219	7.6	–7.0
Majority		468	16.1	+11.1
Turnout		2,899	44.3	–1.1
Registered electors		6,553		
Liberal Democrats gain from Conservative		Swing	▲5.6	
