= 1991 Luton Borough Council election =

Luton Borough Council election

- 2 May 1991

All 48 seats to Luton Borough Council 25 seats needed for a majority

	First party	Second party	Third party
Party	Labour	Conservative	Liberal Democrats
Seats won	28	11	9
Seat change	▲15	▼21	▲6
Popular vote	66,028	54,983	31,016
Percentage	43.0%	35.8%	20.2%
Swing	▲10.6%	▼9.9%	▼1.1%
Control before election
Conservative
Control after election
Labour

The 1991 Luton Borough Council election took place on 2 May 1991 to elect members of Luton Borough Council in Bedfordshire, England. This was on the same day as other local elections.

== Summary ==
=== Election result ===
1991 Luton Borough Council election
Party	Candidates	Seats	Gains	Losses	Net gain/loss	Seats %	Votes %	Votes	+/−
Labour	48	28	15	0	▲15	58.3	43.0	66,028	+10.6
Conservative	48	11	0	21	▼21	22.9	35.8	54,983	–9.9
Liberal Democrats	48	9	6	0	▲6	18.8	20.2	31,016	–1.1
Green	3	0	0	0	Steady	0.0	0.5	782	N/A
Independent	2	0	0	0	Steady	0.0	0.5	741	+0.3

== Ward results ==
Incumbent councillors standing for re-election are marked with an asterisk (*). Changes in seats do not take into account by-elections or defections.

=== Biscot ===
Biscot (3 seats)
Party	Candidate	Votes	%	±%
Labour	R. Davis*	2,055	63.4	+16.8
Labour	M. Guha*	1,893	58.4	+14.7
Labour	D. Stewart*	1,787	55.2	+13.6
Conservative	M. Hussain	727	22.4	–18.5
Conservative	M. Khan	695	21.5	–15.3
Conservative	M. Riaz	686	21.2	—14.6
Liberal Democrats	J. Duffy	338	10.4	–2.0
Liberal Democrats	K. Duffy	321	9.9	–0.9
Liberal Democrats	P. Duffy	268	8.3	–2.4
Independent	S. Rizva	123	3.8	N/A
Turnout		~3,240	44.7	–2.0
Registered electors		7,248		
Labour hold				
Labour hold				
Labour hold				

=== Bramingham ===
Bramingham (3 seats)
Party	Candidate	Votes	%	±%
Conservative	P. Glenister*	1,745	49.9	–5.5
Conservative	R. Dean*	1,730	49.4	–3.9
Conservative	F. Lester*	1,634	46.7	–6.4
Labour	J. Jefferson	1,081	30.9	+8.0
Labour	K. McMulkin	978	27.9	+7.1
Labour	T. Khamis	917	26.2	+5.6
Liberal Democrats	J. Mead	464	13.3	–8.3
Liberal Democrats	D. Hinkley	460	13.1	–7.3
Liberal Democrats	H. Kirchmole	359	10.3	–7.0
Green	M. Stubbs	285	8.1	N/A
Turnout		~3,500	40.0	–7.5
Registered electors		8,751		
Conservative hold				
Conservative hold				
Conservative hold				

=== Challney ===
Challney (3 seats)
Party	Candidate	Votes	%	±%
Labour	L. Collier	1,488	42.2	+9.6
Conservative	B. Dodd*	1,443	41.0	–11.1
Labour	B. Devenish	1,419	40.3	+8.4
Conservative	M. McCarroll*	1,409	40.0	–10.6
Labour	M. Khan	1,266	35.9	+5.9
Conservative	R. Samuels*	1,247	35.4	–10.8
Liberal Democrats	J. Blindell	420	11.9	–3.3
Liberal Democrats	P. Cowell	395	11.2	–3.2
Liberal Democrats	L. Creamer	385	10.9	+0.3
Turnout		~3,522	45.5	±0.0
Registered electors		7,741		
Labour gain from Conservative				
Conservative hold				
Labour gain from Conservative				

=== Crawley ===
Crawley (3 seats)
Party	Candidate	Votes	%	±%
Liberal Democrats	D. Franks*	1,605	40.7	–0.3
Liberal Democrats	L. Patterson*	1,503	38.2	–0.6
Liberal Democrats	L. Felmingham	1,465	37.2	+0.2
Labour	J. Carroll	1,421	36.1	+11.5
Labour	A. Speakman	1,293	32.8	+8.7
Labour	Z. Moran	1,290	32.8	+9.4
Conservative	R. Robinson	893	22.7	–11.7
Conservative	E. Williamson	857	21.8	–12.0
Conservative	R. Guinnane	845	21.5	–7.4
Turnout		~3,939	51.0	+1.8
Registered electors		7,723		
Liberal Democrats hold				
Liberal Democrats hold				
Liberal Democrats hold				

=== Dallow ===
Dallow (3 seats)
Party	Candidate	Votes	%	±%
Labour	D. Taylor*	1,705	59.3	+8.4
Labour	M. Ashraf*	1,673	58.2	+10.2
Labour	H. Akhtar	1,644	57.2	+9.6
Conservative	R. Kitchiner	502	17.5	–17.4
Conservative	M. Parkar	471	16.4	–15.2
Conservative	R. Stangham	459	16.0	–15.5
Liberal Democrats	S. Dolling	272	9.5	–4.6
Liberal Democrats	P. Dolling	239	8.3	–4.8
Liberal Democrats	D. De-Groot	221	7.7	–5.2
Green	P. West	201	7.0	N/A
Turnout		~2,874	43.0	+4.0
Registered electors		6,683		
Labour hold				
Labour hold				
Labour hold				

=== Farley ===
Farley (3 seats)
Party	Candidate	Votes	%	±%
Labour	W. McKenzie*	1,957	66.3	+9.3
Labour	L. McCowan*	1,926	65.3	+9.9
Labour	T. Jenkins	1,893	64.1	+9.1
Conservative	D. Jepson	551	18.7	–10.0
Conservative	M. Whittaker	537	18.2	–9.5
Conservative	P. Wolsey*	492	16.7	–10.1
Liberal Democrats	D. Hooker	275	9.3	–5.0
Liberal Democrats	M. Robinson	261	8.8	–5.3
Liberal Democrats	S. Rutstein	237	8.0	–5.7
Turnout		~2,952	41.7	–0.3
Registered electors		7,078		
Labour hold				
Labour hold				
Labour hold				

=== High Town ===
High Town (3 seats)
Party	Candidate	Votes	%	±%
Labour	J. Fensome*	1,528	47.8	+9.9
Labour	H. Magill	1,433	44.8	+10.1
Labour	B. Gray	1,380	43.1	+10.6
Conservative	K. Drew	1,104	34.5	–4.5
Conservative	M. Lowery	1,029	32.2	–5.2
Conservative	A. Stewart	1,007	31.5	–5.4
Liberal Democrats	D. Chapman	460	14.4	–8.7
Liberal Democrats	J. Jones	358	11.2	–10.1
Liberal Democrats	M. Pringle	353	11.0	–8.0
Green	L. Bliss	296	9.3	N/A
Turnout		~3,199	47.2	+0.4
Registered electors		6,777		
Labour hold				
Labour gain from Conservative				
Labour gain from Conservative				

=== Icknield ===
Icknield (3 seats)
Party	Candidate	Votes	%	±%
Conservative	N. Dunington*	2,286	60.3	–9.3
Conservative	A. Flint*	2,151	56.8	–9.4
Conservative	D. Johnston*	2,136	56.4	–8.9
Labour	K. Hopkins	903	23.8	+8.2
Labour	J. Robson	857	22.6	+7.9
Labour	D. Tester	807	21.3	+7.0
Liberal Democrats	T. Keens	497	13.1	–1.7
Liberal Democrats	R. Knape	494	13.0	–0.1
Liberal Democrats	M. Howes	493	13.0	+0.3
Turnout		~3,790	44.9	–6.1
Registered electors		8,440		
Conservative hold				
Conservative hold				
Conservative hold				

=== Leagrave ===
Leagrave (3 seats)
Party	Candidate	Votes	%	±%
Labour	I. Jefferson	1,491	44.4	+9.8
Labour	L. Randall	1,471	43.8	+9.4
Conservative	M. Garrett*	1,459	43.4	–5.6
Labour	S. Roden	1,315	39.1	+9.4
Conservative	M. Punter*	1,201	35.7	–8.6
Conservative	P. Locke*	1,177	35.0	–7.7
Liberal Democrats	G. Malins	330	9.8	–6.6
Liberal Democrats	M. Maher	303	9.0	–7.4
Liberal Democrats	C. Mole	276	8.2	–7.8
Turnout		~3,360	43.9	+0.6
Registered electors		7,654		
Labour gain from Conservative				
Labour gain from Conservative				
Conservative hold				

=== Lewsey ===
Lewsey (3 seats)
Party	Candidate	Votes	%	±%
Labour	T. Shaw*	1,756	53.4	+17.9
Labour	H. Simmons	1,579	48.0	+12.8
Labour	A. Tester	1,558	47.4	+12.6
Conservative	D. Kennedy	973	29.6	–0.6
Conservative	G. Farrell	953	29.0	–1.1
Conservative	D. Wiles	843	25.6	–2.7
Liberal Democrats	L. McColm	381	11.6	–1.9
Liberal Democrats	I. McColm	380	11.6	–1.3
Liberal Democrats	C. Mead	344	10.5	–1.9
Turnout		~3,288	36.1	–6.9
Registered electors		9,108		
Labour hold				
Labour hold				
Labour hold				

=== Limbury ===
Limbury (3 seats)
Party	Candidate	Votes	%	±%
Conservative	C. Brown*	1,509	46.2	–0.7
Conservative	M. Burke	1,391	42.6	–4.1
Conservative	K. Scott*	1,350	41.3	–2.3
Labour	D. Kilby	1,336	40.9	+13.0
Labour	R. Furness	1,331	40.7	+13.7
Labour	S. Hinds	1,296	39.7	+17.5
Liberal Democrats	J. Varnals	319	9.8	–8.5
Liberal Democrats	M. Varnals	300	9.2	–7.6
Liberal Democrats	E. Young	286	8.8	–5.1
Turnout		~3,268	46.0	–3.9
Registered electors		7,104		
Conservative hold				
Conservative hold				
Conservative hold				

=== Putteridge ===
Putteridge (3 seats)
Party	Candidate	Votes	%	±%
Liberal Democrats	R. Davies	2,618	50.8	+13.2
Liberal Democrats	P. Chapman*	2,437	47.3	+13.6
Liberal Democrats	M. Lincoln	2,290	44.4	+11.8
Conservative	M. Harris*	1,783	34.6	–12.8
Conservative	I. Coppard*	1,730	33.6	–11.9
Conservative	J. Pemberton	1,698	32.9	–12.2
Labour	S. Gardner	779	15.1	+0.1
Labour	W. Pratt	735	14.3	–0.5
Labour	G. Russell	728	14.1	+0.6
Turnout		~5,156	50.2	–0.9
Registered electors		10,270		
Liberal Democrats gain from Conservative				
Liberal Democrats gain from Conservative				
Liberal Democrats gain from Conservative				

=== Saints ===
Saints (3 seats)
Party	Candidate	Votes	%	±%
Labour	A. Roden	1,691	45.6	+9.0
Labour	M. Aktar	1,685	45.4	+10.4
Labour	R. Sills*	1,670	45.0	+10.6
Conservative	G. Kerrigan	1,320	35.6	–11.4
Conservative	K. Foord*	1,259	33.9	–12.7
Conservative	J. White	1,196	32.2	–13.7
Liberal Democrats	D. Malins	381	10.3	–6.1
Liberal Democrats	M. Lincoln	378	10.2	–6.0
Liberal Democrats	B. Murray	376	10.1	–5.6
Turnout		~3,710	50.3	+1.8
Registered electors		7,375		
Labour gain from Conservative				
Labour gain from Conservative				
Labour gain from Conservative				

=== South ===
South (3 seats)
Party	Candidate	Votes	%	±%
Labour	M. Main	1,444	45.7	+15.1
Labour	P. Main	1,427	45.2	+16.2
Labour	M. Scheimann	1,389	44.0	+17.2
Conservative	A. Bush*	1,045	33.1	–12.1
Conservative	L. Benson*	1,040	32.9	–11.2
Conservative	G. Boote*	994	31.5	–11.9
Independent	T. Hayden	618	19.6	N/A
Liberal Democrats	D. Shaw	274	8.7	–15.6
Liberal Democrats	S. Stephens	272	8.6	–15.6
Liberal Democrats	R. Taffs	183	5.8	–18.3
Turnout		~3,157	41.9	+0.8
Registered electors		7,535		
Labour gain from Conservative				
Labour gain from Conservative				
Labour gain from Conservative				

=== Stopsley ===
Stopsley (3 seats)
Party	Candidate	Votes	%	±%
Liberal Democrats	J. Davies	2,111	56.3	+22.8
Liberal Democrats	M. Dolling	1,878	50.1	+20.1
Liberal Democrats	I. Griggs	1,738	46.3	+18.0
Conservative	G. Dillingham*	1,072	28.6	–16.4
Conservative	H. Kerns	853	22.7	–18.0
Conservative	C. Lloyd	832	22.2	–17.8
Labour	W. MacLaughlin	752	20.0	–1.5
Labour	D. McKenzie	751	20.0	–0.6
Labour	N. Rana	633	16.9	–3.2
Turnout		~3,751	52.6	–1.6
Registered electors		7,131		
Liberal Democrats gain from Conservative				
Liberal Democrats gain from Conservative				
Liberal Democrats gain from Conservative				

=== Sundon Park ===
Sundon Park (3 seats)
Party	Candidate	Votes	%	±%
Labour	S. Knight	1,560	53.5	+15.0
Labour	K. Gale	1,540	52.8	+15.4
Labour	R. Roberson	1,517	52.0	+15.1
Conservative	L. Mitchell	900	30.9	–11.2
Conservative	D. Owens	894	30.7	–11.4
Conservative	S. Darby	875	30.0	–9.3
Liberal Democrats	R. Watson	365	12.5	–6.9
Liberal Democrats	M. Williams	349	12.0	–3.0
Liberal Democrats	A. Wyatt	304	10.4	–3.8
Turnout		~2,915	39.6	–5.2
Registered electors		7,631		
Labour gain from Conservative				
Labour gain from Conservative				
Labour gain from Conservative				
