= 1991 Leicester City Council election =

1991 English local election

The 1991 Leicester City Council election took place on 2 May 1991 to elect members of Leicester City Council in England. This was on the same day as other local elections.

== Summary ==
1991 Leicester City Council election
Party	Seats	Gains	Losses	Net gain/loss	Seats %	Votes %	Votes	+/−
Labour	37			▲3	66.1	47.7	80,681	+5.0
Conservative	13			▼3	23.2	32.1	54,243	–6.1
Liberal Democrats	6			Steady	10.7	17.7	29,961	–1.0
Green	0			Steady	0.0	2.4	4,130	+2.1
BNP	0			Steady	0.0	<0.1	54	±0.0
