= 1991 Hertsmere Borough Council election =

Local election in England

- 2 May 1991

13 out of 39 seats to Hertsmere Borough Council 20 seats needed for a majority
- Registered: 41,828
- Turnout: 44.8% (▼4.3%)

	First party	Second party
Party	Conservative	Labour
Seats won	5	7
Seats after	22	12
Seat change	Steady	Steady
Popular vote	7,847	7,308
Percentage	41.9%	39.0%
Swing	▼5.0%	▲11.5%
	Third party	Fourth party
Party	Liberal Democrats	Independent
Seats won	1	0
Seats after	4	1
Seat change	Steady	Steady
Popular vote	2,679	904
Percentage	14.3%	4.8%
Swing	▼6.4%	▼0.1%
- Winner of each seat at the 1991 Hertsmere Borough Council election. Wards in white were not contested.
Control before election
Conservative
Control after election
Conservative

The 1991 Hertsmere Borough Council election took place on 2 May 1991 to elect members of Hertsmere Borough Council in Hertfordshire, England. This was on the same day as other local elections.

== Summary ==
=== Election result ===
1991 Hertsmere Borough Council election
Party	This election				Full council			This election		
Party	Candidates	Seats	Net	Seats %	Other	Total	Total %	Votes	Votes %	+/−
Conservative	{{{candidates}}}	5	Steady	38.5	17	22	56.4	7,847	41.9	–5.0
Labour	{{{candidates}}}	7	Steady	53.8	5	12	30.8	7,308	39.0	+11.5
Liberal Democrats	{{{candidates}}}	1	Steady	7.7	3	4	10.3	2,679	14.3	–6.4
Independent	{{{candidates}}}	0	Steady	0.0	1	1	2.6	904	4.8	–0.1

== Ward results ==
Incumbent councillors standing for re-election are marked with an asterisk (*). Changes in seats do not take into account by-elections or defections.

=== Aldenham East ===
Aldenham East
Party	Candidate	Votes	%	±%
Conservative	S. Nagler	1,188	73.5	+4.2
Liberal Democrats	J. Dennes	240	14.9	+0.8
Labour	C. Stanley	188	11.6	–5.0
Majority		948	58.6	+5.7
Turnout		1,616	48.3	–2.7
Registered electors		3,372		
Conservative hold		Swing	▲1.7	

=== Aldenham West ===
Aldenham West
Party	Candidate	Votes	%	±%
Conservative	G. Nunn*	898	62.4	+5.8
Labour	P. Stanley	542	37.6	+10.6
Majority		356	24.8	–4.8
Turnout		1,440	44.2	–0.9
Registered electors		3,354		
Conservative hold		Swing	▼2.4	

=== Brookmeadow ===
Brookmeadow
Party	Candidate	Votes	%	±%
Labour	D. Button*	840	76.1	–6.8
Conservative	H. Watson	264	23.9	+6.8
Majority		576	52.2	–13.6
Turnout		1,104	39.5	–9.4
Registered electors		2,839		
Labour hold		Swing	▼6.8	

=== Campions ===
Campions
Party	Candidate	Votes	%	±%
Labour	J. Nolan*	612	72.9	+10.0
Conservative	C. Watson	227	27.1	+7.9
Majority		385	45.8	+2.1
Turnout		839	41.4	–2.0
Registered electors		2,040		
Labour hold		Swing	▲1.1	

=== Cowley ===
Cowley
Party	Candidate	Votes	%	±%
Labour	L. Reefe	916	70.1	+8.1
Conservative	M. Mitchell	391	29.9	–1.8
Majority		525	40.2	+9.9
Turnout		1,307	32.0	+3.1
Registered electors		4,339		
Labour hold		Swing	▲5.0	

=== Elstree ===
Elstree
Party	Candidate	Votes	%	±%
Conservative	D. Steene	1,097	54.8	+8.7
Independent	T. Hughes	904	45.2	–8.7
Majority		193	9.6	N/A
Turnout		2,001	49.3	–0.7
Registered electors		4,065		
Conservative hold		Swing	▲8.7	

=== Hillside ===
Hillside
Party	Candidate	Votes	%	±%
Labour	J. Goldberg	858	64.8	+12.8
Conservative	H. Stevens	466	35.2	–5.5
Majority		392	29.6	+18.3
Turnout		1,324	43.8	+4.0
Registered electors		3,077		
Labour hold		Swing	▲9.2	

=== Kenilworth ===
Kenilworth
Party	Candidate	Votes	%	±%
Labour	F. Ward*	720	60.6	–15.6
Conservative	M. Sullivan	312	26.2	+2.4
Liberal Democrats	M. Barr	157	13.2	N/A
Majority		408	34.4	–19.0
Turnout		1,189	44.4	–3.7
Registered electors		2,721		
Labour hold		Swing	▼9.0	

=== Lyndhurst ===
Lyndhurst
Party	Candidate	Votes	%	±%
Labour	H. Caylor*	710	47.7	–4.8
Conservative	H. Cohen	602	40.4	+3.9
Liberal Democrats	C. Baynton	177	11.9	N/A
Majority		108	7.3	–8.7
Turnout		1,489	49.6	+14.3
Registered electors		3,058		
Labour hold		Swing	▼4.4	

=== Mill ===
Mill
Party	Candidate	Votes	%	±%
Liberal Democrats	M. Colne*	1,276	72.1	+8.7
Conservative	R. Pavitt	278	15.7	–4.9
Labour	T. Balmer	216	12.2	–3.8
Majority		998	56.4	+13.6
Turnout		1,770	53.2	–2.5
Registered electors		3,326		
Liberal Democrats hold		Swing	▲6.8	

=== Potters Bar East ===
Potters Bar East
Party	Candidate	Votes	%	±%
Conservative	R. Calcutt	1,102	46.1	+2.5
Labour	P. Caylor	935	39.1	–1.6
Liberal Democrats	M. Allan	353	14.8	–0.9
Majority		167	7.0	+4.1
Turnout		2,390	52.4	+1.6
Registered electors		4,578		
Conservative hold		Swing	▲2.1	

=== Potters Bar West ===
Potters Bar West
Party	Candidate	Votes	%	±%
Conservative	E. Muddle*	684	47.6	–11.9
Liberal Democrats	C. Dean	400	27.8	+9.9
Labour	B. Kerr	353	24.6	+2.1
Majority		284	19.8	–21.8
Turnout		1,437	41.4	+5.2
Registered electors		3,469		
Conservative hold		Swing	▼10.9	

=== Shenley ===
Shenley
Party	Candidate	Votes	%	±%
Labour	W. Hogan*	418	50.2	+7.8
Conservative	P. Banton	338	40.6	+9.2
Liberal Democrats	L. Cote	76	9.1	–17.1
Majority		80	9.6	–1.4
Turnout		832	52.3	–5.7
Registered electors		1,590		
Labour hold		Swing	▼0.7	
