= 1991 Wyre Borough Council election =

Election

- 2 May 1991

All 55 seats to Wyre Borough Council 28 seats needed for a majority

	First party	Second party	Third party
Party	Conservative	Labour	Liberal Democrats
Last election	43	8	4
Seats won	32	17	5
Seat change	▼12	▲9	▲1
Popular vote	42,103	32,743	6,586
	Fourth party
Party	Independent
Last election	0
Seats won	1
Seat change	▲1
Popular vote	566
Leader before election
Conservative
Leader after election
Conservative

The 1991 Wyre Borough Council election took place on 2 May 1991. This election was held on the same day as the 1991 United Kingdom local elections.

== Summary ==
The Conservatives retained control but with a significantly reduced majority as Labour made strong gains.

=== Election result ===
1991 Wyre Borough Council
Party	Candidates	Seats	Gains	Losses	Net gain/loss	Seats %	Votes %	Votes	+/−
Conservative	53	32	0	12	▼12			42,103	
Labour	46	17	9	0	▲9			32,743	
Liberal Democrats	11	5	1	0	▲1			6,586	
Residents	4	1	1	0	▲1				
Independent	1	1	1	0	▲1			566	

== Ward Results ==
=== Bailey ===
Bailey (3 seats)
Party	Candidate	Votes	%	±%
Labour	Vink A.*	1,019	64.5	
Labour	Aspden J. Ms.	945		
Labour	Alexander D.	933		
Conservative	Carroll F.	562	35.5	
Conservative	Hall W.	561		
Turnout		4,020	43.9	
Labour hold				
Labour hold				
Labour gain from Conservative				

=== Bourne ===
Bourne (3 seats)
Party	Candidate	Votes	%	±%
Conservative	Croft T.*	1,157	35.3	
Labour	Dawkins A.	1,015	31.0	
Labour	Jackson J. Ms.	979		
Conservative	Gray N.	936		
Conservative	McGrandle N. Ms.*	932		
Labour	Smith R.	838		
Residents	Sharp J.	678	20.7	
Liberal Democrats	McCarthy J.	427	13.0	
Turnout		5,962	48.9	
Conservative hold				
Labour gain from Conservative				
Labour gain from Conservative				

=== Breck ===
Breck (2 seats)
Party	Candidate	Votes	%	±%
Conservative	Roper G.*	858	58.6	
Conservative	Taylor H.*	857		
Labour	Myers H. Ms.	605	41.4	
Labour	Fail J.	597		
Turnout		2,917	55.5	
Conservative hold				
Conservative hold				

=== Brock ===
Brock (1 seat)
Party	Candidate	Votes	%	±%
Conservative	Fox A.*	400	61.9	
Liberal Democrats	Rogers P.	246	38.1	
Turnout		646	51.7	
Conservative hold				

=== Calder ===
Calder (1 seat)
Party	Candidate	Votes	%	±%
Conservative	Ibison T.*	326	46.0	
Liberal Democrats	Sloman E.	278	39.3	
Labour	Wattam C. Ms.	104	14.7	
Turnout		708	59.8	
Conservative hold				

=== Carleton ===
Carleton (2 seats)
Party	Candidate	Votes	%	±%
Conservative	Macgregor S.*	1,234	62.4	
Conservative	Ward J.*	1,141		
Labour	Smith P.	743	37.6	
Labour	Walker A.	724		
Turnout		3,842	53.1	
Conservative hold				
Conservative hold				

=== Catterall ===
Catterall (1 seat)
Party	Candidate	Votes	%	±%
Liberal Democrats	Sharples D.*	719	68.9	
Conservative	Wilson V. Ms.	325	31.1	
Turnout		1,044	65.7	
Liberal Democrats hold				

=== Cleveleys Park ===
Cleveleys Park (3 seats)
Party	Candidate	Votes	%	±%
Labour	Oxley D.	1,009	40.9	
Labour	Barker S.	960		
Conservative	Berry C.*	904	36.6	
Conservative	Bannister D.	903		
Labour	Traynor J.	898		
Conservative	Oldfield M. Ms.	825		
Residents	Cohen I. Ms.	554	22.5	
Turnout		6,053	56.6	
Labour gain from Conservative				
Labour gain from Conservative				
Conservative hold				

=== Duchy ===
Duchy (1 seat)
Party	Candidate	Votes	%	±%
Liberal Democrats	Simpson I.*	733	73.6	
Conservative	Smith P.	263	26.4	
Turnout		996	61.8	
Liberal Democrats hold				

=== Garstang ===
Garstang (2 seats)
Party	Candidate	Votes	%	±%
Liberal Democrats	Cornthwaite A.*	1,138	51.7	
Liberal Democrats	Sharrock R.*	1,134		
Conservative	Salisbury G.	888	40.3	
Labour	Freeland R.	177	8.0	
Labour	Jenkins C.	146		
Turnout		3,483	63.2	
Liberal Democrats hold				
Liberal Democrats hold				

=== Great Eccleston ===
Great Eccleston (1 seat)
Party	Candidate	Votes	%	±%
Conservative	Collins K.	Unopposed		
Turnout		0	0.0	
Conservative hold				

=== Hambleton ===
Hambleton (2 seats)
Party	Candidate	Votes	%	±%
Conservative	Williamson R.*	1,101	68.3	
Conservative	Pimbley T.*	995		
Labour	Mett H.	511	31.7	
Labour	Cameron R.	510		
Turnout		3,117	44.6	
Conservative hold				
Conservative hold				

=== Hardhorn ===
Hardhorn (2 seats)
Party	Candidate	Votes	%	±%
Conservative	Stebbing C.*	1,098	68.3	
Conservative	Bailey A.	1,080		
Labour	Moore M. Ms.	509	31.7	
Labour	Musson J. Ms.	436		
Turnout		3,123	61.2	
Conservative hold				
Conservative hold				

=== High Cross ===
High Cross (2 seats)
Party	Candidate	Votes	%	±%
Conservative	Catlow P. Ms.*	946	53.8	
Conservative	Richardson M.	895		
Labour	Robert A.	814	46.3	
Labour	Hogston S. Ms.	709		
Turnout		3,364	63.6	
Conservative hold				
Conservative hold				

=== Jubilee ===
Jubilee (2 seats)
Party	Candidate	Votes	%	±%
Residents	Roberts G.	915	46.8	
Conservative	Roberts N.	500	25.6	
Conservative	Kelsall R.	440		
Liberal Democrats	Gormally C.	271	13.9	
Labour	Leadbetter E.	270	13.8	
Labour	Rimmer E.	263		
Turnout		2,659	46.5	
Residents gain from Conservative				
Conservative hold				

=== Mount ===
Mount (2 seats)
Party	Candidate	Votes	%	±%
Labour	Fisher C.	844	74.5	
Labour	Anyon R.	838		
Conservative	Bryans C.	289	25.5	
Conservative	Whitewood C.	271		
Turnout		2,242	41.5	
Labour hold				
Labour hold				

=== Norcross ===
Norcross (2 seats)
Party	Candidate	Votes	%	±%
Conservative	Jolley L.*	695	40.1	
Conservative	Jordin L. Ms.*	688		
Liberal Democrats	Gleeson F. Ms.	588	33.9	
Liberal Democrats	Oldham V. Ms.	561		
Labour	Owen J.	452	26.1	
Turnout		2,984	51.9	
Conservative hold				
Conservative hold				

=== Park ===
Park (3 seats)
Party	Candidate	Votes	%	±%
Labour	Allen R.*	1,080	63.9	
Labour	Leadbetter S.*	988		
Labour	Horrocks G.*	943		
Conservative	Gotto D.	610	36.1	
Conservative	Cooke G.	564		
Conservative	Latus F.	551		
Turnout		4,736	46.5	
Labour hold				
Labour hold				
Labour hold				

=== Pharos ===
Pharos (2 seats)
Party	Candidate	Votes	%	±%
Labour	Fisher I.	649	42.0	
Independent	Barlow M. Ms.*	566	36.6	
Labour	Gerrard E. Ms.	510		
Conservative	Briggs R.*	332	21.5	
Conservative	Cartwright M. Ms.	297		
Turnout		2,354	46.7	
Labour hold				
Independent gain from Conservative				

=== Pilling ===
Pilling (1 seat)
Party	Candidate	Votes	%	±%
Conservative	Watson R.*	514	76.0	
Labour	Marland B.	162	24.0	
Turnout		676	40.2	
Conservative hold				

=== Preesall ===
Preesall (3 seats)
Party	Candidate	Votes	%	±%
Conservative	Mutch J. Ms.*	1,089	51.2	
Conservative	McCann I.	1,038		
Labour	Higginson K.	1,037	48.8	
Conservative	Raby P.*	982		
Labour	Oliver F.	905		
Labour	Woods S.	878		
Turnout		5,929	51.5	
Conservative hold				
Conservative hold				
Labour gain from Conservative				

=== Rossall ===
Rossall (3 seats)
Party	Candidate	Votes	%	±%
Conservative	King H.*	1,217	60.5	
Conservative	Smith E.*	1,154		
Conservative	Walker K. Ms.	1,111		
Labour	Riley V.	794	39.5	
Labour	Colby M. Ms.	777		
Labour	Smith J. Ms.	743		
Turnout		5,796	51.3	
Conservative hold				
Conservative hold				
Conservative hold				

=== Staina ===
Staina (3 seats)
Party	Candidate	Votes	%	±%
Conservative	Ashworth C.*	1,063	39.5	
Conservative	Simpson J.	983		
Conservative	Lawrenson R.	974		
Residents	Isherwood L.	968	35.9	
Labour	Condron J.	662	24.6	
Turnout		4,650	50.7	
Conservative hold				
Conservative hold				
Conservative hold				

=== Tithebarn ===
Tithebarn (2 seats)
Party	Candidate	Votes	%	±%
Conservative	Hawley P.*	923	55.6	
Conservative	Baker D.*	920		
Labour	Young C.	506	30.5	
Labour	Cooke R.	466		
Green	Thornton A. Ms.	230	13.9	
Turnout		3,045	52.7	
Conservative hold				
Conservative hold				

=== Victoria ===
Victoria (3 seats)
Party	Candidate	Votes	%	±%
Conservative	Preston S. Ms.*	1,000	59.0	
Conservative	Grime J.*	953		
Conservative	Travis B.	951		
Labour	Brind R.	696	41.0	
Turnout		3,600	45.8	
Conservative hold				
Conservative hold				
Conservative hold				

=== Warren ===
Warren (3 seats)
Party	Candidate	Votes	%	±%
Labour	Anderton M. Ms.	1,119	56.9	
Labour	Butler I.	1,080		
Labour	Irish G.	900		
Conservative	Andrews G.	849	43.1	
Conservative	Vincent A.*	781		
Conservative	Marr L.*	726		
Turnout		5,455	54.6	
Labour gain from Conservative				
Labour gain from Conservative				
Labour gain from Conservative				

=== Wyresdale ===
Wyresdale (1 seat)
Party	Candidate	Votes	%	±%
Liberal Democrats	Graddon J.	491	52.1	
Conservative	Hardman J.*	451	47.9	
Turnout		942	66.7	
Liberal Democrats gain from Conservative				
