= 1991 St Albans City and District Council election =

St Albans City and District Council election

The 1991 St Albans City and District Council election took place on 2 May 1991 to elect members of St Albans City and District Council in England. This was on the same day as other local elections.

== Election result ==
1991 St Albans City and District Council election
| Party | This election | | | Full council | | | This election | | |
| Party | Seats | Net | Seats % | Other | Total | Total % | Votes | Votes % | +/− |
|---|---|---|---|---|---|---|---|---|---|
| Conservative | 8 | ▼4 | 42.1 | 19 | 27 | 47.4 | 17,214 | 37.0 | +3.9 |
| Liberal Democrats | 8 | ▲3 | 42.1 | 12 | 20 | 35.1 | 16,990 | 36.5 | +6.7 |
| Labour | 3 | ▲1 | 15.8 | 6 | 9 | 15.8 | 9,885 | 21.2 | -5.4 |
| Independent | 0 | 0 | 0.0 | 1 | 1 | 1.8 | 450 | 1.0 | -1.7 |
| Green | 0 | 0 | 0.0 | 0 | 0 | 0.0 | 1,981 | 4.3 | -3.5 |

== Ward results ==
=== Ashley ===
Ashley
| Party | Candidate | Votes | % | ±% |
|---|---|---|---|---|
| Liberal Democrats | R. Guy* | 1,131 | 43.5 | +2.9 |
| Labour | P. Murphy | 739 | 28.4 | –4.7 |
| Conservative | J. Quin | 633 | 24.3 | +3.8 |
| Green | E. Benjamin | 99 | 3.8 | –2.1 |
| Majority | | 392 | 15.1 | +7.6 |
| Turnout | | 2,602 | 51.7 | –3.3 |
| Registered electors | | 5,060 | | |
| Liberal Democrats hold | | Swing | ▲3.8 | |

=== Batchwood ===
Batchwood
| Party | Candidate | Votes | % | ±% |
|---|---|---|---|---|
| Labour | K. White* | 1,112 | 47.0 | –7.5 |
| Conservative | J. Christie | 582 | 24.6 | +3.1 |
| Liberal Democrats | H. Smith | 537 | 22.7 | +8.3 |
| Green | S. Adamson | 135 | 5.7 | –3.9 |
| Majority | | 530 | 22.4 | –10.6 |
| Turnout | | 2,366 | 50.0 | –5.2 |
| Registered electors | | 4,744 | | |
| Labour hold | | Swing | ▼5.3 | |

=== Clarence ===
Clarence
| Party | Candidate | Votes | % | ±% |
|---|---|---|---|---|
| Liberal Democrats | J. Whale* | 1,234 | 52.0 | +0.6 |
| Conservative | T. Boyle | 648 | 27.3 | +4.0 |
| Labour | B. Dearman | 381 | 16.0 | –2.5 |
| Green | D. Burningham | 112 | 4.7 | –2.1 |
| Majority | | 586 | 24.7 | –3.4 |
| Turnout | | 2,375 | 55.8 | –5.6 |
| Registered electors | | 4,263 | | |
| Liberal Democrats hold | | Swing | ▼1.7 | |

=== Cunningham ===
Cunningham
| Party | Candidate | Votes | % | ±% |
|---|---|---|---|---|
| Liberal Democrats | R. Donald | 1,298 | 47.4 | –5.2 |
| Labour | C. Donovan | 688 | 25.1 | +7.2 |
| Conservative | M. Wragg | 679 | 24.8 | +2.1 |
| Green | E. Brown | 72 | 2.6 | –4.1 |
| Majority | | 610 | 22.3 | –5.8 |
| Turnout | | 2,737 | 55.0 | –6.4 |
| Registered electors | | 4,988 | | |
| Liberal Democrats hold | | Swing | ▼6.2 | |

=== Harpenden East ===
Harpenden East
| Party | Candidate | Votes | % | ±% |
|---|---|---|---|---|
| Liberal Democrats | C. Canfield | 1,238 | 43.6 | +4.1 |
| Conservative | M. Morrell* | 1,211 | 42.7 | +5.5 |
| Labour | D. Crew | 304 | 10.7 | –4.3 |
| Green | J. Bishop | 85 | 3.0 | –5.3 |
| Majority | | 27 | 1.0 | –1.3 |
| Turnout | | 2,838 | 57.0 | –4.0 |
| Registered electors | | 5,004 | | |
| Liberal Democrats gain from Conservative | | Swing | ▼0.7 | |

=== Harpenden North ===
Harpenden North
| Party | Candidate | Votes | % | ±% |
|---|---|---|---|---|
| Conservative | H. Haynes | 1,253 | 50.3 | +2.1 |
| Liberal Democrats | H. Adams | 817 | 32.8 | +10.1 |
| Labour | R. Botterill | 419 | 16.8 | –4.9 |
| Majority | | 436 | 17.5 | –8.0 |
| Turnout | | 2,489 | 43.1 | –5.9 |
| Registered electors | | 5,844 | | |
| Conservative hold | | Swing | ▼4.0 | |

No Green candidate as previous (7.3%).

=== Harpenden South ===
Harpenden South
| Party | Candidate | Votes | % | ±% |
|---|---|---|---|---|
| Conservative | C. Bailey* | 1,367 | 57.4 | +2.5 |
| Liberal Democrats | K. Sutton | 645 | 27.1 | +9.4 |
| Labour | H. Holmes | 300 | 12.6 | –4.5 |
| Green | A. Pearce | 68 | 2.9 | –7.4 |
| Majority | | 722 | 30.3 | –6.8 |
| Turnout | | 2,380 | 46.3 | –5.9 |
| Registered electors | | 5,174 | | |
| Conservative hold | | Swing | ▼3.5 | |

=== Harpenden West ===
Harpenden West
| Party | Candidate | Votes | % | ±% |
|---|---|---|---|---|
| Conservative | D. Coe* | 1,326 | 57.6 | +3.2 |
| Liberal Democrats | A. Steer | 676 | 29.4 | +9.5 |
| Labour | J. O'Brien | 200 | 8.7 | –5.8 |
| Green | B. Pope | 100 | 4.3 | –6.9 |
| Majority | | 650 | 28.2 | –6.3 |
| Turnout | | 2,302 | 46.7 | –5.6 |
| Registered electors | | 4,964 | | |
| Conservative hold | | Swing | ▼3.2 | |

=== London Colney ===
London Colney
| Party | Candidate | Votes | % | ±% |
|---|---|---|---|---|
| Labour | E. Gordon | 1,431 | 60.8 | –0.2 |
| Conservative | P. Grimes | 717 | 30.5 | +6.9 |
| Liberal Democrats | T. Lodhi | 129 | 5.5 | –3.8 |
| Green | B. Pope | 77 | 3.3 | –2.8 |
| Majority | | 714 | 30.3 | –7.1 |
| Turnout | | 2,354 | 43.2 | –4.2 |
| Registered electors | | 5,527 | | |
| Labour gain from Conservative | | Swing | ▼3.6 | |

=== Marshallwick North ===
Marshallwick North
| Party | Candidate | Votes | % | ±% |
|---|---|---|---|---|
| Liberal Democrats | P. Halpin | 1,354 | 53.5 | +9.3 |
| Conservative | P. Johnston | 880 | 34.8 | –0.7 |
| Labour | A. Rose | 228 | 9.0 | –5.6 |
| Green | R. Starkey | 69 | 2.7 | –3.0 |
| Majority | | 474 | 18.7 | +10.0 |
| Turnout | | 2,531 | 52.5 | –2.9 |
| Registered electors | | 4,850 | | |
| Liberal Democrats gain from Conservative | | Swing | ▲5.0 | |

=== Marshallwick South ===
Marshallwick South
| Party | Candidate | Votes | % | ±% |
|---|---|---|---|---|
| Liberal Democrats | P. Burton | 1,392 | 47.1 | +3.1 |
| Conservative | R. Scranage | 1,070 | 36.2 | +0.6 |
| Labour | D. Allan | 384 | 13.0 | –3.0 |
| Green | A. Tindale | 110 | 3.7 | –0.7 |
| Majority | | 322 | 10.9 | +2.4 |
| Turnout | | 2,956 | 57.7 | –4.4 |
| Registered electors | | 5,144 | | |
| Liberal Democrats gain from Conservative | | Swing | ▲1.3 | |

=== Park Street ===
Park Street
| Party | Candidate | Votes | % | ±% |
|---|---|---|---|---|
| Liberal Democrats | J. Finley | 932 | 52.5 | +18.5 |
| Conservative | D. Foheringham | 537 | 30.3 | –3.1 |
| Labour | L. Adams | 253 | 14.3 | –7.1 |
| Green | A. Harrison | 53 | 3.0 | –8.2 |
| Majority | | 395 | 22.3 | +21.7 |
| Turnout | | 1,775 | 41.2 | –9.1 |
| Registered electors | | 4,317 | | |
| Liberal Democrats hold | | Swing | ▲10.8 | |

=== Redbourn ===
Redbourn
| Party | Candidate | Votes | % | ±% |
|---|---|---|---|---|
| Conservative | B. Chapman* | 971 | 43.4 | –4.5 |
| Liberal Democrats | P. Schofield | 938 | 42.0 | N/A |
| Labour | P. Robinson | 221 | 9.9 | –19.2 |
| Green | D. Cockroft | 105 | 4.7 | –18.2 |
| Majority | | 33 | 1.5 | –17.3 |
| Turnout | | 2,235 | 50.8 | +0.5 |
| Registered electors | | 4,317 | | |
| Conservative hold | | Swing | N/A | |

=== Sopwell ===
Sopwell
| Party | Candidate | Votes | % | ±% |
|---|---|---|---|---|
| Labour | D. Batley | 1,419 | 60.5 | –4.7 |
| Conservative | G. Brown | 422 | 18.0 | +3.8 |
| Liberal Democrats | R. Biddle | 410 | 17.5 | +5.2 |
| Green | S. Allcock | 95 | 4.0 | –4.3 |
| Majority | | 997 | 42.5 | –8.4 |
| Turnout | | 2,346 | 46.4 | –7.8 |
| Registered electors | | 5,085 | | |
| Labour hold | | Swing | ▼4.3 | |

=== Sandridge ===
Sandridge
| Party | Candidate | Votes | % | ±% |
|---|---|---|---|---|
| Conservative | C. Whiteside* | 816 | 46.5 | –6.8 |
| Independent | B. Filmer | 450 | 25.7 | N/A |
| Liberal Democrats | M. Lawson | 275 | 15.7 | –16.0 |
| Labour | E. Adams | 173 | 9.9 | +4.1 |
| Green | F. Ellis | 39 | 2.2 | –0.8 |
| Majority | | 366 | 20.9 | –0.7 |
| Turnout | | 1,753 | 44.6 | –7.0 |
| Registered electors | | 3,928 | | |
| Conservative hold | | Swing | N/A | |

=== St. Peters ===
St. Peters
| Party | Candidate | Votes | % | ±% |
|---|---|---|---|---|
| Liberal Democrats | J. Gunner* | 1,161 | 48.6 | +5.2 |
| Labour | D. Paton | 645 | 27.0 | –4.9 |
| Conservative | R. Wakerly | 417 | 17.4 | +1.3 |
| Green | C. Simmons | 168 | 7.0 | –1.6 |
| Majority | | 516 | 21.6 | +10.1 |
| Turnout | | 2,391 | 49.0 | –5.9 |
| Registered electors | | 4,880 | | |
| Liberal Democrats hold | | Swing | ▲5.1 | |

=== St. Stephens ===
St. Stephens
| Party | Candidate | Votes | % | ±% |
|---|---|---|---|---|
| Conservative | A. Nowell* | 1,261 | 44.4 | +16.2 |
| Liberal Democrats | J. Eagling | 1,099 | 38.7 | +22.0 |
| Labour | N. Williamson | 393 | 13.8 | +1.4 |
| Green | H. Clemow | 90 | 3.2 | +0.2 |
| Majority | | 162 | 5.7 | N/A |
| Turnout | | 2,843 | 49.6 | –12.4 |
| Registered electors | | 5,740 | | |
| Conservative hold | | Swing | ▼2.9 | |

No Independent candidate as previous (39.7%).

=== Verulam ===
Verulam
| Party | Candidate | Votes | % | ±% |
|---|---|---|---|---|
| Conservative | J. Smith | 1,307 | 47.2 | +3.2 |
| Liberal Democrats | J. Cooper | 1,004 | 36.4 | +10.9 |
| Labour | K. Sutton | 321 | 11.6 | –7.9 |
| Green | W. Berrington | 124 | 4.5 | –6.4 |
| Majority | | 303 | 11.0 | –7.7 |
| Turnout | | 2,756 | 54.1 | –3.8 |
| Registered electors | | 5,104 | | |
| Conservative hold | | Swing | ▼3.9 | |

=== Wheathampstead ===
Wheathampstead
| Party | Candidate | Votes | % | ±% |
|---|---|---|---|---|
| Conservative | D. Hills* | 1,117 | 44.8 | +7.7 |
| Liberal Democrats | R. Adams | 720 | 28.9 | –18.5 |
| Green | P. King | 380 | 15.3 | +11.0 |
| Labour | C. Chadney | 274 | 11.0 | –0.3 |
| Majority | | 397 | 15.9 | N/A |
| Turnout | | 2,491 | 52.9 | –6.0 |
| Registered electors | | 4,774 | | |
| Conservative hold | | Swing | ▲13.1 | |
