= 1991 Watford Borough Council election =

Watford Borough Council election

The 1991 Watford Borough Council election took place in 1991 to elect members of Watford Borough Council in England. This was the same day as other local elections.

== Results summary ==
1991 Watford Borough Council election
Party	This election			Full council			This election		
Party	Seats	Net	Seats %	Other	Total	Total %	Votes	Votes %	+/−
Labour	8	Steady	61.5	14	22	61.1	10,696	40.6	-6.0
Conservative	3	Steady	23.1	8	11	30.6	9,250	35.1	+3.0
Liberal Democrats	2	Steady	15.4	1	3	8.3	6,190	23.5	+4.9
Green	0	Steady	0.0	0	0	0.0	183	0.7	-0.2
Independent	0	Steady	0.0	0	0	0.0	53	0.2	-0.2

== Ward results ==
=== Callowland ===
Callowland
Party	Candidate	Votes	%	±%
Labour	P. Cannings	838	58.5	
Conservative	N. Bentham	417	29.1	
Liberal Democrats	A. Wylie	177	12.4	
Majority			29.4	
Turnout			34.2	
Labour hold		Swing		

=== Central ===
Central
Party	Candidate	Votes	%	±%
Labour	V. Conlon	924	54.2	
Conservative	F. Silva	500	29.3	
Liberal Democrats	J. Beardsworth	228	13.4	
Independent	C. Edgerton	53	3.1	
Majority			24.9	
Turnout			35.4	
Labour hold		Swing		

=== Holywell ===
Holywell (2 seats due to by-election)
Party	Candidate	Votes	%
Labour	A. Head	899	55.6
Labour	S. Rosser	867	53.6
Conservative	J. Pepper	411	25.4
Conservative	A. Underwood	403	24.9
Liberal Democrats	J. Baddeley	236	14.6
Liberal Democrats	M. Baird	224	13.9
Turnout		1,617	38.1
Labour hold			
Labour hold			

=== Leggatts ===
Leggatts
Party	Candidate	Votes	%	±%
Labour	E. Muspratt	977	58.5	
Conservative	C. Strange	432	25.9	
Liberal Democrats	J. Waller	261	15.6	
Majority			32.6	
Turnout			39.5	
Labour hold		Swing		

=== Meriden ===
Meriden
Party	Candidate	Votes	%	±%
Labour	N. Tyrwhitt	1,253	54.4	
Conservative	M. Bell	709	30.8	
Liberal Democrats	D. Thornhill	343	14.9	
Majority			23.6	
Turnout			41.3	
Labour hold		Swing		

=== Nascot ===
Nascot
Party	Candidate	Votes	%	±%
Conservative	L. Brown	1,234	58.9	
Liberal Democrats	J. Lindsay	453	21.6	
Labour	D. Shaw	305	14.6	
Green	A. Cripps	102	4.9	
Majority			37.3	
Turnout			42.3	
Conservative hold		Swing		

=== Oxhey ===
Oxhey
Party	Candidate	Votes	%	±%
Liberal Democrats	I. Sharpe	1,230	47.5	
Conservative	K. Emmons	844	32.6	
Labour	M. Lawson	518	20.0	
Majority			14.9	
Turnout			53.6	
Liberal Democrats hold		Swing		

=== Park ===
Park
Party	Candidate	Votes	%	±%
Conservative	P. Kiely	1,306	62.3	
Liberal Democrats	P. Jenkins	483	23.0	
Labour	T. Meldrum	227	10.8	
Green	I. Tottman	81	3.9	
Majority			39.2	
Turnout			51.5	
Conservative hold		Swing		

=== Stanborough ===
Stanborough
Party	Candidate	Votes	%	±%
Liberal Democrats	A. Lee	1,317	50.2	
Conservative	K. Solomon	720	27.5	
Labour	J. Gail	584	22.3	
Majority			22.8	
Turnout			53.1	
Liberal Democrats hold		Swing		

=== Tudor ===
Tudor
Party	Candidate	Votes	%	±%
Conservative	M. Taylor	1,003	41.0	
Labour	J. Lowe	996	40.7	
Liberal Democrats	J. Richmond	446	18.2	
Majority			0.3	
Turnout			49.4	
Conservative hold		Swing		

=== Vicarage ===
Vicarage
Party	Candidate	Votes	%	±%
Labour	R. Marland	1,151	53.7	
Conservative	E. Uphill	640	29.9	
Liberal Democrats	R. Laslett	353	16.5	
Majority			23.8	
Turnout			38.3	
Labour hold		Swing		

=== Woodside ===
Woodside
Party	Candidate	Votes	%	±%
Labour	J. Horsefield	1,157	52.0	
Conservative	G. White	631	28.3	
Liberal Democrats	D. Scudder	439	19.7	
Majority			23.6	
Turnout			43.8	
Labour hold		Swing		
