= 1991 South Ribble Borough Council election =

1991 UK local government election

Elections to South Ribble Borough Council were held on 2 May 1991. The whole council was up for election and the Conservative Party retained control of the council.

Composition of the Borough Council after the 1991 election

== Election result ==
South Ribble local election result 1991
Party	Seats	Gains	Losses	Net gain/loss	Seats %	Votes %	Votes	+/−
Conservative	33			▼4	61.1	49.2	43,698	
Labour	15			▲4	27.8	37.8	33,553	
Liberal Democrats	6			Steady	11.1	12.3	10,889	
Independent	0			Steady	0.0	0.5	400	
Green	0			Steady	0.0	0.3	223	

== Ward results ==
All Saints
Party	Candidate	Votes	%	±%
Labour	B. Greenland	1,171	18.0	
Labour	B. Yates	1,110	17.1	
Conservative	M. Rhodes	1,091	16.8	
Conservative	D. Walmsley	1078	16.5	
Labour	G. Hull	1032	15.9	
Conservative	J. Williams	1021	15.7	

Bamber Bridge Central
Party	Candidate	Votes	%	±%
Conservative	F. Cooper	1,102	18.3	
Conservative	G. Woods	1,061	17.6	
Labour	G. Davies	1,038	17.2	
Conservative	T. Dixon	997	16.6	
Labour	M. Kelly	925	15.4	
Labour	M. Mayor	900	14.9	

Bamber Bridge South
Party	Candidate	Votes	%	±%
Labour	T. Hanson	1,036	19.5	
Labour	J. Owen	971	18.2	
Labour	L. Pullinger	926	17.4	
Conservative	E. Battersby	855	16.1	
Conservative	M. Rhodes	785	14.7	
Conservative	K. Cleminson	750	14.1	

Charnock
Party	Candidate	Votes	%	±%
Labour	D. Wooldridge	366	50.1	
Conservative	N. Morris	364	49.9	

Farington
Party	Candidate	Votes	%	±%
Conservative	E. Chadwick	1,225	18.1	
Conservative	G. Cross	1,225	18.1	
Conservative	G. Thorpe	1,204	17.8	
Labour	N. Berry	1204	16.6	
Labour	G. Baehren	1023	15.1	
Labour	T. Hardacre	966	14.3	

Howick
Party	Candidate	Votes	%	±%
Conservative	D. Stewart	876	40.9	
Conservative	H. Smith	863	40.3	
Labour	J. Dickinson	404	18.9	

Hutton & New Longton
Party	Candidate	Votes	%	±%
Conservative	D. Stewart	1,239	21.1	
Conservative	J. Hesketh	1,206	20.5	
Conservative	A. Underwood	1,137	19.3	
Liberal Democrats	B. Thackeray	572	9.7	
Labour	R. Parkinson	480	8.2	
Independent	P. Wearden	400	6.8	
Labour	M. Graham	329	5.6	
Labour	S. Farmer	296	5.0	
Green	S. Berry	223	3.8	

Kingsfold
Party	Candidate	Votes	%	±%
Conservative	B. Bannister	1,153	18.6	
Conservative	F. Almond	1,057	17.1	
Conservative	E. Carson	1,039	16.8	
Labour	R. Durham	987	15.9	
Labour	D. Bretherton	981	15.8	
Labour	W. Banks	973	15.7	

Leyland Central
Party	Candidate	Votes	%	±%
Liberal Democrats	K. Orrell	870	29.7	
Liberal Democrats	D. Foster	675	23.0	
Labour	G. Eckersley	516	17.6	
Labour	F. Heyowrth	456	15.5	
Conservative	S. Crowe	209	7.1	
Conservative	J. Otter	208	7.1	

Leyland St. Ambrose
Party	Candidate	Votes	%	±%
Liberal Democrats	N. Orrell	1,096	34.2	
Liberal Democrats	M. Kirkham	1,006	31.4	
Labour	B. Walmsley	440	13.7	
Labour	M. Derbyshire	404	12.6	
Conservative	B. Thompson	255	8.0	

Leyland St. Johns
Party	Candidate	Votes	%	±%
Labour	J. Hocking	1,381	31.1	
Labour	J. Ryan	1,142	25.7	
Labour	B. Wilson	1,097	24.7	
Liberal Democrats	R. Prescott	429	9.7	
Conservative	D. Baker	390	8.8	

Leyland St. Marys
Party	Candidate	Votes	%	±%
Conservative	J. Treacher	989	15.2	
Liberal Democrats	J. Knowles	984	15.1	
Liberal Democrats	A. Roscoe	919	14.1	
Liberal Democrats	J. Cairns	898	13.8	
Conservative	M. Lacey	827	12.7	
Conservative	J. Aspden	823	12.6	
Labour	J. Capstick	544	8.3	
Labour	A. Nicholson	544	8.2	

Little Hoole & Much Hoole
Party	Candidate	Votes	%	±%
Conservative	E. Webster	684	34.9	
Conservative	J. Knowles	575	29.4	
Liberal Democrats	T. Yates	369	18.8	
Labour	G. Davis	330	16.9	

Lonton Central & West
Party	Candidate	Votes	%	±%
Conservative	R. Colton	1,093	25.5	
Conservative	E. Nicholls	1,049	24.5	
Conservative	J. Breakell	1,033	24.1	
Labour	R. Wright	430	10.0	
Labour	T. Jackson	346	8.1	
Labour	K. Rowland	330	7.7	

Lostock Hall
Party	Candidate	Votes	%	±%
Conservative	J. Hughes	1,348	19.6	
Conservative	N. Crossley	1,332	19.4	
Conservative	K. Beattie	1,329	19.3	
Labour	K. Pownall	1045	15.2	
Labour	M. Salmon	923	13.4	
Labour	J. Stoker	900	13.1	

Manor
Party	Candidate	Votes	%	±%
Conservative	M. Askew	713	24.5	
Conservative	V. Baker	699	24.0	
Liberal Democrats	J. Holleran	526	18.1	
Liberal Democrats	M. Thomason	484	16.6	
Labour	S. Turner	265	9.1	
Labour	D. Womack	221	7.6	

Middleforth Green
Party	Candidate	Votes	%	±%
Conservative	J. Richardson	909	27.4	
Conservative	M. Elliott	797	24.0	
Labour	D. Pownall	633	19.1	
Labour	R. Derbyshire	562	16.9	
Liberal Democrats	S. Farron	229	7.0	
Liberal Democrats	M. Gardner	188	5.7	

Moss Side
Party	Candidate	Votes	%	±%
Labour	A. Brown	855	15.3	
Labour	D. Snape	778	13.9	
Labour	G. Lewis	766	13.7	
Conservative	G. Seddon	617	11.0	
Conservative	D. Woods	590	10.5	
Conservative	M. Harry	579	10.3	
Liberal Democrats	M. Simmonds	484	8.6	
Liberal Democrats	C. Stunell	469	8.4	
Liberal Democrats	K. Woods	460	8.2	

Priory
Party	Candidate	Votes	%	±%
Conservative	R. Haworth	898	41.6	
Conservative	A. Simmons	779	36.1	
Labour	K. Woods	480	22.3	

Samlesbury & Cuerdale
Party	Candidate	Votes	%	±%
Conservative	B. Loffler	337	66.2	
Labour	P. Clough	173	33.8	

Seven Stars
Party	Candidate	Votes	%	±%
Labour	J. Kelly	894	39.5	
Labour	A. Dawson	837	37.0	
Conservative	K. Tomlinson	291	12.9	
Liberal Democrats	S. Gardner	240	10.6	

Walton Le Dale
Party	Candidate	Votes	%	±%
Conservative	K. Palmer	1,024	21.1	
Conservative	J. Lawson	1,020	21.1	
Conservative	H. Clarkson	1,003	20.7	
Labour	S. Bennett	665	13.7	
Labour	B. Yates	581	12.0	
Labour	M. Cottam	549	11.3	
