= 1991 Broxbourne Borough Council election =

1991 UK local government election

The Broxbourne Council election, 1991 was held to elect council members of the Broxbourne Borough Council, the local government authority of the borough of Broxbourne, Hertfordshire, England.

== Composition of expiring seats before election ==
Ward	Party	Incumbent elected	Incumbent	Standing again?
Broxbourne	Conservative	1987	Joyce Ball	Yes
Bury Green	Conservative	1987	Michael Hanson	No
Cheshunt Central	Conservative	1987	Graham Brewster (Note: Graham Brewster stood in Goffs Oak Ward in 1991.)	Yes
Cheshunt North	Conservative	1987	Doris Moody	No
Flamstead End	Conservative	1987	James Swannell	Yes
Goffs Oak	Conservative	1987	Christina Rooke	No
Hoddesdon North	Conservative	1990	Richard Kemp	Yes
Hoddesdon Town	Conservative	1987	Moyra O'Neil	Yes
Rosedale	Conservative	1987	Paul Havis	Yes
Rye Park	Conservative	1987	Gerald Walker	No
Theobalds	Conservative	1987	Roy Chaplow	Yes
Waltham Cross North	Conservative	1989	Amanda Hayward	Yes
Waltham Cross South	Labour	1987	David Adams	No
Wormley & Turnford	Conservative	1987	Beryle Poole	Yes

== Election results ==
Broxbourne local election result 1991
Party	Seats	Gains	Losses	Net gain/loss	Seats %	Votes %	Votes	+/−
Conservative	14	1	1	0	87.50	53.53	14,163	
Labour	1	0	1	-1	6.25	28.17	7,454	
Liberal Democrats	1	1	0	+1	6.25	18.32	4,848	

== Results summary ==
An election was held in 14 wards on 2 May 1991.

16 council seats were contested (2 seats in Bury Green Ward & 2 seats in Cheshunt Central Ward)

The Liberal Democrats gained 1 seat from the Conservatives in Rosedale Ward.

The Conservative Party gained a seat from the Labour Party in Bury Green Ward

- Conservative 35 seats
- Labour 5 seats
- Liberal Democrats 2 Seats

== Ward results ==
Broxbourne Ward Result 2 May 1991
Party	Candidate	Votes	%	±%
Conservative	Joyce Ball	1,253	66.12	
Liberal Democrats	Anthony Fey	433	22.85	
Labour	Christopher Evans	209	11.03	
Majority		820		
Turnout		1,895	34.80	
Conservative hold		Swing		

Bury Green Ward Result 2 seats 2 May 1991
Party	Candidate	Votes	%	±%
Conservative	Arthur Dowsett	1,093	25.59	
Conservative	Geoffrey Morris	1,027	24.05	
Labour	Linda Dambrauskas	883	20.67	
Labour	Tony Dambrauskas	827	19.36	
Liberal Democrats	Jennifer Ahern	243	5.69	
Liberal Democrats	Alice Blanchard	198	4.64	
Turnout		4,271	40.70	
Conservative hold		Swing		
Conservative gain from Labour		Swing		

Cheshunt Central Ward Result 2 May 1991
Party	Candidate	Votes	%	±%
Conservative	Brian Creamer	824	30.67	
Conservative	Trevor Simpson	767	28.56	
Labour	Graham Knight	308	11.47	
Labour	Henry Lucas	288	10.72	
Liberal Democrats	Sheila Guy	254	9.46	
Liberal Democrats	Peter Huse	245	9.12	
Turnout		2,686	40.30	
Conservative hold		Swing		
Conservative hold		Swing		

Cheshunt North Ward Result 2 May 1991
Party	Candidate	Votes	%	±%
Conservative	Margaret Wipperman	1,026	56.37	
Labour	Gillian Harvey	508	27.91	
Liberal Democrats	Julian Gould	286	15.72	
Majority		518		
Turnout		1,820	34.00	
Conservative hold		Swing		

Flamstead End Ward Result 2 May 1991
Party	Candidate	Votes	%	±%
Conservative	James Swannell	1,008	58.37	
Labour	Derrick Shiers	445	25.77	
Liberal Democrats	Clive Chandler	274	15.86	
Majority		563		
Turnout		1,727	36.00	
Conservative hold		Swing		

Goffs Oak Ward Result 2 May 1991
Party	Candidate	Votes	%	±%
Conservative	Graham Brewster	898	70.32	
Liberal Democrats	Reginald Williams	241	18.87	
Labour	Stephen Ferns	138	10.81	
Majority		657		
Turnout		1,277	37.20	
Conservative hold		Swing		

Hoddesdon North Ward Result 2 May 1991
Party	Candidate	Votes	%	±%
Conservative	Richard Kemp	1,129	61.19	
Liberal Democrats	Patricia Waughrey	372	20.16	
Labour	Olive Foskett	344	18.65	
Majority		757		
Turnout		1,845	37.50	
Conservative hold		Swing		

Hoddesdon Town Ward Result 2 May 1991
Party	Candidate	Votes	%	±%
Conservative	Moyra O'Neill	1,007	50.07	
Liberal Democrats	Malcolm Aitken	658	32.72	
Labour	Brian Shepherd	346	17.21	
Majority		349		
Turnout		2,011	41.50	
Conservative hold		Swing		

Rosedale Ward Result 2 May 1991
Party	Candidate	Votes	%	±%
Liberal Democrats	Paul Seeby	461	41.61	
Conservative	Paul Havis	430	38.81	
Labour	Joan Saggs	217	19.58	
Majority		31		
Turnout		1,108	40.00	
Liberal Democrats gain from Conservative		Swing		

Rye Park Ward Result 2 May 1991
Party	Candidate	Votes	%	±%
Conservative	Evelyn White	833	43.75	
Labour	Thomas Dowd	726	38.13	
Liberal Democrats	Frank Bassill	345	18.12	
Majority		107		
Turnout		1,904	41.90	
Conservative hold		Swing		

Theobalds Ward Result 2 May 1991
Party	Candidate	Votes	%	±%
Conservative	Roy Chaplow	833	50.15	
Labour	Julia Theobald	569	34.26	
Liberal Democrats	Kathleen Jolly	259	15.59	
Majority		264		
Turnout		1,661	40.20	
Conservative hold		Swing		

Waltham Cross North Ward Result 2 May 1991
Party	Candidate	Votes	%	±%
Conservative	Amanda Hayward	709	52.56	
Labour	Malcolm Theobald	498	36.92	
Liberal Democrats	Anthony Stokes	142	10.52	
Majority		211		
Turnout		1,349	45.00	
Conservative hold		Swing		

Waltham Cross South Ward Result 2 May 1991
Party	Candidate	Votes	%	±%
Labour	Jeanne West	817	52.07	
Conservative	George Allen	577	36.78	
Liberal Democrats	Peter Kemp	175	11.15	
Majority		240		
Turnout		1,569	38.60	
Labour hold		Swing		

Wormley / Turnford Ward Result 2 May 1991
Party	Candidate	Votes	%	±%
Conservative	Beryl Poole	749	55.81	
Labour	Annette Marples	331	24.66	
Liberal Democrats	James Emslie	262	19.53	
Majority		418		
Turnout		1,342	29.20	
Conservative hold		Swing		
