= 1991 Gloucester City Council election =

UK local election

The 1991 Gloucester City Council election took place on 2 May 1991 to elect members of Gloucester City Council in England.

== Results ==
Gloucester City Council election, 1991
Party	Seats	Gains	Losses	Net gain/loss	Seats %	Votes %	Votes	+/−
Labour	17					48.6		
Conservative	10					28.6		
Liberal Democrats	7					20.0		
Other	1					2.9		

== Ward results ==
=== Barnwood ===
Barnwood 1991
Party	Candidate	Votes	%	±%
Conservative	N. Ravenhill	1,984	43.6	
Labour	S. McHale	1,956	43.0	
Liberal Democrats	W. Crowther	614	13.5	
Turnout		4,554	44.8	
Conservative gain from Labour		Swing		

=== Barton ===
Barton 1991
Party	Candidate	Votes	%	±%
Labour	*Ms. R. Workman	1,362	71.5	
Conservative	M. Greenhalgh	382	20.1	
Liberal Democrats	Ms. V. Ellis	160	8.4	
Turnout		1,904	36.2	
Labour hold		Swing		

=== Eastgate ===
Eastgate 1991
Party	Candidate	Votes	%	±%
Labour	B. O'Neil	1,477	61.6	
Conservative	L. Proctor	619	25.8	
Liberal Democrats	Ms. A. Gribble	301	12.6	
Turnout		2,397	41.5	
Labour hold		Swing		

=== Hucclecote ===
Hucclecote 1991
Party	Candidate	Votes	%	±%
Conservative	*T. Wathen	1,646	42.1	
Liberal Democrats	G.Phillips	1,432	36.6	
Labour	Ms. K. Mills	835	21.3	
Turnout		3,913	53.3	
Conservative hold		Swing		

=== Kingsholm ===
Kingsholm 1991
Party	Candidate	Votes	%	±%
Liberal Democrats	Mr. C. Twiggs	1,610	45.8	
Conservative	P. Awford	1,337	38.1	
Labour	D. Hitcings	566	16.1	
Turnout		3,513	51.7	
Liberal Democrats hold		Swing		

=== Linden ===
Linden 1991
Party	Candidate	Votes	%	±%
Labour	Ms. P. Judge	1,581	60.4	
Conservative	G. Parrott	762	29.1	
Liberal Democrats	Ms. B. Caldwell	276	10.5	
Turnout		2,619	48.0	
Labour gain from Res				

=== Longlevens ===
Longlvens 1991
Party	Candidate	Votes	%	±%
Conservative	N.* Partridge	1,686	46.1	
Labour	D. Pyle	1,434	39.2	
Liberal Democrats	J. Goodwin	541	14.8	
Turnout		3,661	54.2	
Conservative gain from Labour		Swing		

=== Matson ===
Matson 1991
Party	Candidate	Votes	%	±%
Labour	K.* Stephens	1,465	62.0	
Conservative	A. Palmer	568	24.0	
Liberal Democrats	M. Vaughan	331	14.0	
Turnout		2,364	39.6	
Labour hold		Swing		

=== Podsmead ===
Podsmead 1991
Party	Candidate	Votes	%	±%
Labour	D. Munro	1,110	39.4	
Liberal Democrats	Ms. A. Evans	891	31.6	
Conservative	P. Beardsley	819	29.0	
Turnout		2,820	49.0	
Labour hold		Swing		

=== Quedgeley ===
Quedgeley 1991
Party	Candidate	Votes	%	±%
Conservative	D. Hall	1,027	49.4	
Conservative	T.* Hogarth	1,010		
Labour	R.* Hudson	763	36.7	
Labour	W. Adie	636		
Liberal Democrats	Ms. V. Wilcox	290	13.9	
Liberal Democrats	A. Gribble	289		
Turnout			40.6	
Conservative win (new seat)				

=== Tuffley ===
Tuffley (2) 2002
Party	Candidate	Votes	%	±%
Labour	A. Cook	1,654	49.2	
Conservative	C. Hart	1,354	40.2	
Liberal Democrats	Ms. M. Morgan	356	10.6	
Turnout		3,356	54.3	
Labour hold		Swing		

=== Westgate ===
Westgate 1991
Party	Candidate	Votes	%	±%
Liberal Democrats	P.* Lush	1,045	46.5	
Liberal Democrats	J. Absalom	975		
Conservative	Ms. P. Tracey	734	32.7	
Conservative	W. Large	696		
Labour	Ms. G. Gillespie	468	20.8	
Labour	Ms. A. Wedley	403		
Turnout			42.6	
Liberal Democrats hold		Swing		
