= 1991 Guildford Borough Council election =

1991 UK local government election

The sixth full elections for Guildford Borough Council took place on 2 May 1991. The Conservatives lost control of Guildford Borough Council for the first time since the council was created in the early 1970s. Overall the election resulted in a hung council with 19 Conservative councillors, 19 Liberal Democrats, 6 Labour and 1 independent.

Relative to the 1987 elections the Conservatives lost 11 seats, the Liberal Democrats gained 10 and one gain was made by an independent.

The Liberal Democrats gained all six seats in the Ash and Tongham area from the Conservatives consisting of the following wards Ash, Ash Vale and Tongham.

Additionally the Liberal Democrats gained four seats in the town of Guildford from the Conservatives. These 4 gains were as follows - the remaining Conservative councillor for Onslow ward; both Conservative councillors for Holy Trinity and one of the two Conservatives councillors for Christchurch.

An independent captured a seat from the Conservatives in the rural Tillingbourne ward to the south west of the borough.

== Results by ward ==
Ash (top 3 candidates elected)
Party	Candidate	Votes	%	±%
Liberal Democrats	Mrs R Davies	1564		
Liberal Democrats	A Hillier	1563		
Liberal Democrats	Ms F White	1501		
Conservative	J Ades	1479		
Conservative	M Cole	1382		
Conservative	R Ratcliffe	1151		
Labour	M Gallagher	281		
Labour	Mrs N Gallagher	269		
Labour	K Jasinski	234		
Majority		22		
Liberal Democrats gain from Conservative		Swing		
Liberal Democrats gain from Conservative		Swing		
Liberal Democrats gain from Conservative		Swing		

Ash Vale (top 2 candidates elected)
Party	Candidate	Votes	%	±%
Liberal Democrats	D Evans	1216		
Liberal Democrats	Ms O Hooker	1208		
Conservative	Mrs M Lloyd-Jones	854		
Conservative	M Measures	794		
Labour	N David	152		
Labour	D Enright	146		
Majority		354		
Liberal Democrats gain from Conservative		Swing		
Liberal Democrats gain from Conservative		Swing		

Christchurch (top 2 candidates elected)
Party	Candidate	Votes	%	±%
Conservative	A Hodges	995		
Liberal Democrats	Mrs V Johnson	943		
Conservative	R Majoribanks	887		
Liberal Democrats	R Ashworth	879		
Labour	M Hill	102		
Labour	Ms A Pringle	89		
All Night	Ms D Hughes	20		
Majority		56		
Conservative hold		Swing		
Liberal Democrats gain from Conservative		Swing		

Clandon & Horsley (top 3 candidates elected)
Party	Candidate	Votes	%	±%
Conservative	Mrs J Powell	2031		
Conservative	D May	1988		
Conservative	Miss G Drakeford	1951		
Liberal Democrats	F Oxford	699		
Liberal Democrats	I Main	666		
Liberal Democrats	Mrs R Steele	660		
Labour	Ms M Beynon	283		
Labour	Ms R Cameron	221		
Labour	Ms T Haimes	219		
Majority		1252		
Conservative hold		Swing		
Conservative hold		Swing		
Conservative hold		Swing		

Effingham (only 1 candidate elected)
Party	Candidate	Votes	%	±%
Conservative	T Page	598		
Liberal Democrats	R Parker	199		
Labour	D Sims	71		
Majority		399		
Conservative hold		Swing		

Friary & St. Nicolas (top 3 candidates elected)
Party	Candidate	Votes	%	±%
Liberal Democrats	R Marks	1802		
Liberal Democrats	R Blundell	1765		
Liberal Democrats	T Sharp	1745		
Conservative	P Hooper	690		
Conservative	P Thomas	671		
Conservative	A Alisha	658		
Labour	R Body	339		
Labour	Dr A Gunning	335		
Labour	S Islam	260		
All Night	G Clutterbuck	65		
Majority		1055		
Liberal Democrats hold		Swing		
Liberal Democrats hold		Swing		
Liberal Democrats hold		Swing		

Holy Trinity (top 2 candidates elected)
Party	Candidate	Votes	%	±%
Liberal Democrats	G Bridger	1106		
Liberal Democrats	Mrs T Baker	1105		
Conservative	A Allenby	885		
Conservative	A Dewhurst	867		
Labour	Ms A Dale	134		
Labour	P Newmark	105		
All Night	T Fuller	28		
Majority		220		
Liberal Democrats gain from Conservative		Swing		
Liberal Democrats gain from Conservative		Swing		

Lovelace (only 1 candidate elected)
Party	Candidate	Votes	%	±%
Conservative	Mrs Greenleaf	487		
Liberal Democrats	J Hartley	475		
Majority		12		
Conservative hold		Swing		

Merrow & Burpham (top 3 candidates elected)
Party	Candidate	Votes	%	±%
Conservative	T Hargrave	2037		
Conservative	Mrs J Jordan	2012		
Conservative	P Johnson	1993		
Liberal Democrats	Miss S Jenkins	1364		
Liberal Democrats	Mrs J Thomas	1262		
Liberal Democrats	A Sutcliffe	1209		
Labour	E Allford	622		
Labour	J Carney	593		
Labour	Ms M Wu	539		
All Night	Ms D Gomez	96		
Majority		629		
Conservative hold		Swing		
Conservative hold		Swing		
Conservative hold		Swing		

Normandy (only 1 candidate elected)
Party	Candidate	Votes	%	±%
Liberal Democrats	G Taylor	682		
Conservative	Mrs J Drage	535		
Labour	N Cridland	61		
Majority		147		
Liberal Democrats hold		Swing		

Onslow (top 3 candidates elected)
Party	Candidate	Votes	%	±%
Liberal Democrats	Mrs L Strudwick	1361		
Liberal Democrats	T Phillips	1329		
Liberal Democrats	Mrs J Biggs	1095		
Conservative	B Parke	1055		
Conservative	Mrs P Parke	801		
Conservative	K Johns	773		
Labour	J Bullock	481		
Labour	Mrs F Flynn	365		
Labour	K Parfitt	347		
All Night	K Chanot	60		
Majority		40		
Liberal Democrats hold		Swing		
Liberal Democrats hold		Swing		
Liberal Democrats gain from Conservative		Swing		

Pilgrims (top 2 candidate elected)
Party	Candidate	Votes	%	±%
Conservative	M Williamson	859		
Conservative	R Rolfe	826		
Liberal Democrats	P Mellor	363		
Liberal Democrats	P Dyer	323		
Labour	F Gunning	150		
Majority		463		
Conservative hold		Swing		
Conservative hold		Swing		

Pirbright (only 1 candidate elected)
Party	Candidate	Votes	%	±%
Conservative	Mrs C Cobley	536		
Liberal Democrats	A Woodbine	244		
Majority		292		
Conservative hold		Swing		

Send (top 2 candidates elected)
Party	Candidate	Votes	%	±%
Conservative	K Taylor	767		
Conservative	D Wilde	631		
Liberal Democrats	Mrs A Lambe	399		
Independent	J Hill	206		
Labour	Mrs H Thompson	195		
Labour	N Cameron	156		
Majority		232		
Conservative hold		Swing		
Conservative hold		Swing		

Shalford (only 1 candidate elected)
Party	Candidate	Votes	%	±%
Conservative	Mrs S Stewart	682		
Liberal Democrats	L Grugeon	658		
Labour	C Barber	156		
All Night	S Webster	20		
Majority		24		
Conservative hold		Swing		

Stoke (top 3 candidates elected)
Party	Candidate	Votes	%	±%
Labour	GR Bellerby	2112		
Labour	Mrs S Thornberry	1699		
Labour	Mrs H Tipton	1592		
Conservative	R Gregory	413		
Conservative	H Warwick	367		
Conservative	D Quelch	350		
Liberal Democrats	Mrs V Biggs	269		
Liberal Democrats	Ms L Jacobs	252		
Liberal Democrats	W Plaskett	244		
All Night	Mrs H Goldsmoth	79		
Majority		1179		
Labour hold		Swing		
Labour hold		Swing		
Labour hold		Swing		

Stoughton (top 3 candidates elected)
Party	Candidate	Votes	%	±%
Liberal Democrats	C Fox	1859		
Liberal Democrats	Mrs S Fox	1788		
Liberal Democrats	Mrs J Marks	1618		
Conservative	Mrs S Knight	567		
Conservative	M Crosson	559		
Conservative	N Daniels	530		
Labour	J Barbour	376		
Labour	B Hall	371		
Labour	R Medlow	342		
All Night	K Hills	48		
Majority		1051		
Liberal Democrats hold		Swing		
Liberal Democrats hold		Swing		
Liberal Democrats hold		Swing		

Tillingbourne (top 2 candidates elected)
Party	Candidate	Votes	%	±%
Conservative	Mrs A List	1091		
Independent	K Childs	1049		
Conservative	N Brougham	1023		
Liberal Democrats	J Wild	389		
Labour	P Dowden	363		
Majority		26		
Conservative hold		Swing		
Independent gain from Conservative		Swing		

Tongham (only 1 candidate elected)
Party	Candidate	Votes	%	±%
Liberal Democrats	M Pooley	574		
Conservative	M Naylor	339		
Labour	Ms K Parfitt	40		
Majority		175		
Liberal Democrats gain from Conservative		Swing		

Westborough (top 3 candidates elected)
Party	Candidate	Votes	%	±%
Labour	Mrs D Bellerby	1551		
Labour	J Patrick	1318		
Labour	J Woodhatch	1284		
Liberal Democrats	K Briggs	545		
Liberal Democrats	P Anderson	497		
Liberal Democrats	W Morris	443		
Conservative	Mrs M Johns	371		
Conservative	D Knight	354		
All Night	K Goldsmith	77		
Majority		739		
Labour hold		Swing		
Labour hold		Swing		
Labour hold		Swing		

Worplesdon (top 3 candidates elected)
Party	Candidate	Votes	%	±%
Conservative	Mrs S Lloyd	1390		
Conservative	Mrs C Griffin	1389		
Conservative	R Price	1369		
Liberal Democrats	M Johnson	1183		
Liberal Democrats	J Heath	1173		
Liberal Democrats	W Palmer	1116		
Labour	K Horne	364		
Labour	W Lock	164		
All Night	A Webster	88		
Majority		186		
Conservative hold		Swing		
Conservative hold		Swing		
Conservative hold		Swing		
