= 1991 Wolverhampton Metropolitan Borough Council election =

1991 UK local government election

The 1991 Council elections held in Wolverhampton on Thursday 2 May 1991 were one third, and 20 of the 60 seats were up for election.

During the 1991 election the Merry Hill ward had two seats contested due to a vacancy arising.

Prior to the election the constitution of the Council was:

- Labour 31
- Conservative 23
- Liberal Democrats 4
- Liberal 1
- Vacancy 1

Following the election the constitution of the Council was:

- Labour 35
- Conservative 22
- Liberal Democrats 3

== Ward results ==
Bilston East
Party	Candidate	Votes	%	±%
Labour	T H Turner	1738		
Liberal Democrats	Mrs A Ramsbottom	616		
Conservative	R Green	413		
Ind. Conservative	J Davies	260		
Majority		1122		

Bilston North
Party	Candidate	Votes	%	±%
Labour	Miss M Benton	2257		
Conservative	S Mills	1599		
Liberal Democrats	Mrs L Gwinnett	432		
Majority		658		

Blakenhall
Party	Candidate	Votes	%	±%
Labour	R Reynolds	2477		
Conservative	Mrs J Shore	1221		
Liberal Democrats	Mrs M O'Brien	415		
Majority		1256		

Bushbury
Party	Candidate	Votes	%	±%
Conservative	P J Turley	2571		
Labour	P Hamid	1357		
Liberal Democrats	A Whitehouse	456		
Majority		1214		

East Park
Party	Candidate	Votes	%	±%
Labour	F Docherty	2049		
Conservative	M Bailey	863		
Liberal Democrats	J R Steatham	749		
Majority		1186		

Ettingshall
Party	Candidate	Votes	%	±%
Labour	Mrs J Jones	2162		
Conservative	Miss A J Green	717		
Liberal Democrats	I Kerr	241		
Majority		1445		

Fallings Park
Party	Candidate	Votes	%	±%
Conservative	B Findlay	2032		
Labour	I Grainger	1983		
Liberal	A Bourke	296		
Liberal Democrats	S Birch	240		
Majority		49		

Graiseley
Party	Candidate	Votes	%	±%
Conservative	J P Mellor	2501		
Labour	Mrs J Rowley	2353		
Liberal Democrats	W Beard	354		
Majority		148		

Heath Town
Party	Candidate	Votes	%	±%
Labour	M Jaspal	1469		
Liberal	C Hallmark	1160		
Conservative	Mrs T Brindley	833		
Majority		309		

Low Hill
Party	Candidate	Votes	%	±%
Labour	P O'Neill	2342		
Conservative	A Lort	862		
Liberal Democrats	D Isles	330		
Majority		1480		

Merry Hill
Party	Candidate	Votes	%	±%
Conservative	R Hart	2612		
Conservative	Mrs C V Mills	2186		
Labour	C F Matthews	1327		
Labour	S Smith	1273		
Liberal Democrats	J White	576		
Liberal Democrats	S Jones-Williams	546		

Oxley
Party	Candidate	Votes	%	±%
Conservative	N Patten	2074		
Labour	L Turner	1837		
Liberal Democrats	I Jenkins	536		
Majority		237		

Park
Party	Candidate	Votes	%	±%
Conservative	Mrs M W Hodson	2662		
Labour	K Vernon	1843		
Liberal Democrats	B H Lewis	659		
Majority		819		

Penn
Party	Candidate	Votes	%	±%
Conservative	Paddy Bradley	2966		
Labour	P Bhutta	942		
Liberal Democrats	Mrs C Jones-Williams	771		
Majority		2024		

St Peter's
Party	Candidate	Votes	%	±%
Labour	R Lawrence	2902		
Conservative	M Norton	728		
Liberal Democrats	R Gray	400		
Majority		2172		

Spring Vale
Party	Candidate	Votes	%	±%
Liberal Democrats	Mrs K M Morgan	2402		
Labour	Mrs B Johnson	1889		
Conservative	A Round	689		
Ind. Conservative	E Shaw	104		
Majority		513		

Tettenhall Regis
Party	Candidate	Votes	%	±%
Conservative	J Davis	2425		
Liberal Democrats	L McLean	1572		
Labour	Mrs P Wesley	829		
Majority		853		

Tettenhall Wightwick
Party	Candidate	Votes	%	±%
Conservative	J Inglis	3114		
Labour	Mrs C M Siarkiewicz	979		
Liberal Democrats	Mrs T O'Brien	496		
Majority		2135		

Wednesfield North
Party	Candidate	Votes	%	±%
Labour	Mrs G Stafford-Good	1998		
Conservative	A Dawson	1690		
Liberal	M Pearson	892		
Majority		308		

Wednesfield South
Party	Candidate	Votes	%	±%
Conservative	T Brindley	1843		
Labour	R Garner	1832		
Liberal Democrats	P Richards	432		
Majority		11		
