= 1991 South Kesteven District Council election =

1991 UK local government election

The 1991 South Kesteven District Council election for the South Kesteven District Council was held in South Kesteven in 1991.

== Results by ward ==
=== Deeping St James Ward ===
Deeping St James Election May 1991 - Three seats
| Party | Candidate | Votes | % | ±% |
|---|---|---|---|---|
| Liberal Democrats | Peter Hilton | 940 | | |
| Liberal Democrats | Kenneth Joynson | 861 | | |
| Conservative | Victor Bulmer-Jones | 817 | | |
| Conservative | Wendy Stenton | 798 | | |
| Conservative | Charles Aveling | 722 | | |
| Liberal Democrats | John Goodyear | 766 | | |
| Independent | Horace Thompson | 341 | | |

=== Market and West Deeping Ward ===
Market and West Deeping May 1991 - Three seats
| Party | Candidate | Votes | % | ±% |
|---|---|---|---|---|
| Liberal Democrats | Reg Ducker | 816 | | |
| Liberal Democrats | Hazel Perry | 861 | | |
| Independent | Reg Howard | 683 | | |
| Conservative | Peter Shattock | 595 | | |
| Conservative | Peter Hibbins | 558 | | |
| Labour | Colin Boon | 276 | | |
