= History of the East Riding of Yorkshire =

History of a local government district

The East Riding of Yorkshire is a local government district with unitary authority status, and is a ceremonial county of England. It is named after the historic East Riding of Yorkshire which was one of three ridings alongside the North Riding and West Riding, which were constituent parts of Yorkshire ceremonial and administrative county until 1974. From 1974 to 1996 the area of the modern East Riding of Yorkshire constituted the northern part of Humberside.

== Location ==
As a ceremonial county, the East Riding of Yorkshire borders North Yorkshire, South Yorkshire and Lincolnshire, and includes the city of Kingston upon Hull, which is a separate unitary authority. As a district it borders North East Lincolnshire (over the Humber estuary), North Lincolnshire (over the Humber and on land), Hull, Doncaster, Selby, York, Ryedale and Scarborough.

== Administrative history ==
The East Riding originated in antiquity. Unlike most counties in Great Britain, which were divided anciently into hundreds, Yorkshire was divided first into three ridings and then into numerous wapentakes within each riding. The ancient wapentake system is not used in the modern day, though it is an important part of Yorkshire's cultural heritage. Within the East Riding of Yorkshire there were seven wapentakes (including Hull), two of these were further sub-divided into divisions, thus;

1. Ouse and Derwent
2. Buckrose
3. Harthill – Wilton Beacon Division
4. Harthill – Holme Beacon Division
5. Howdenshire
6. Harthill – Hunsley Beacon Division

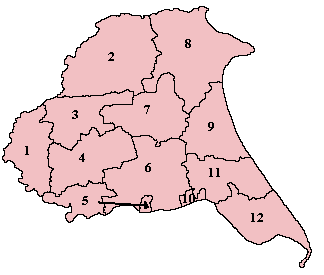
Wapentakes

7. Harthill – Bainton Beacon Division
8. Dickering
9. Holderness – North Division
10. Kingston upon Hull (county corporate)
11. Holderness – Middle Division
12. Holderness – South Division

The separate Lieutenancy for the riding was established after the Restoration, and the ridings each had separate Quarter Sessions.

For statistical purposes in the 19th century an East Riding of Yorkshire registration county was designated, consisting of the entirety of the poor law unions of Beverley, Bridlington, Driffield, Howden, Hull, Patrington, Pocklington, Sculcoates, Skirlaugh and York, thus excluding parts of the historic riding around Norton and Sherburn (which are also excluded from the modern district), but also including the city of York and environs (more usually associated with the West Riding). These poor law unions formed the basis of rural sanitary districts in 1875.

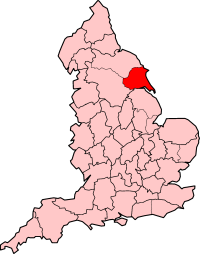
The administrative county, shown with borders from 1965 to 1974 (Hull not indicated).

A county council for the East Riding of Yorkshire was set up in 1889, covering an administrative county which did not cover the county borough of Hull, but otherwise had the same boundaries as the historic riding. Apart from Hull the East Riding contained two municipal boroughs, Beverley and Hedon.

Under the Local Government Act 1894 the rest of the administrative county was divided into rural districts and urban districts. The rural districts were based on the rural sanitary districts, with Beverley Rural District, Bridlington Rural District, Driffield Rural District, Howden Rural District, Patrington Rural District, Pocklington Rural District, Riccal Rural District, Sculcoates Rural District and Skirlaugh Rural District being formed as-is.

Several other rural districts were formed by divisions of rural sanitary districts to conform to the administrative county borders : Sherburn Rural District and Norton Rural District came from Scarborough and Malton RSDs respectively (otherwise in North Riding); Riccal Rural District from Selby RSD (otherwise in the West Riding); and Escrick Rural District which was previously part of York RSD (which covered all three ridings). Urban districts were Cottingham, Great Driffield, Filey, Hessle (from 1899), Hornsea, Norton, Pocklington and Withernsea (from 1898).

The East Riding's only large town is Hull, a major port. Hull's population of which rose rapidly in the late 19th century : quadrupling from about 60,000 in 1851 to 240,000 in 1901. Other towns in the riding did not have similar growth and remain small: Bridlington's permanent population remained largely static in the same period, increasing from 6,000 to around 7,000. By 1971 the riding had a population of slightly over 500,000. In comparison, the West Riding (including county boroughs) saw extensive urbanisation and the formation of several conurbations, and had a population of nearly 4,000,000 in 1971, and the North Riding a population of about 700,000. Beverley was once a town of some importance, with St. John's College and Beverley Minster. The college was suppressed along with the monastery in the 16th century (see Dissolution of the Monasteries) and the town entered a decline in relative importance, although gaining a charter of incorporation in 1573, having previously been under the Archbishop of York. Beverley benefited somewhat from the proximity of Hull during the Industrial Revolution, and became the county town for the East Riding administrative county in 1892.

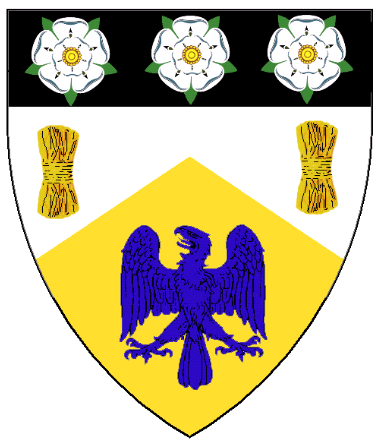
The coat of arms of the East Riding County Council, granted in 1945 and used until 1974.

Bridlington obtained municipal borough status in 1899, having become a resort town (as had Hornsea and Withernsea), although not matching the population growth of Scarborough further up the coast in the North Riding.

The county districts underwent a major reorganisation in 1935 :

- Derwent Rural District formed from most of Escrick RD, Riccal RD and part of Howden RD (which continued in existence)
- Holderness Rural District formed from Patrington RD and Skirlaugh RD
- Sherburn RD abolished, split between Bridlington RD, Norton RD and part to Filey UD
- Sculcoates RD abolished, mostly to Beverley RD
- Great Driffield urban district made smaller and renamed Driffield, the rural part going to Nafferton parish in Driffield Rural District
- an urban district of Haltemprice formed to cover the urbanised area west of Hull, from Cottingham and Hessle urban districts, and parts of Sculcoates Rural District (including Haltemprice, West Ella and parts of other parishes)
- Pocklington urban district abolished and added to Pocklington RD

Both the administrative county and the historic Lieutenancy were abolished under the Local Government Act 1972, on 1 April 1974, with most of the riding going to form the northern part of Humberside. Some parts became part of North Yorkshire, with the borough of Scarborough taking in Filey UD and part of the Bridlington Rural District, the district of Ryedale taking in Norton and the former Norton Rural District, and the district of Selby taking in the former Derwent Rural District. Humberside also included northern Lincolnshire, and Goole and the former Goole Rural District, which are in the historic West Riding.

The creation of a cross-Humber authority was unpopular, despite the promise of the Humber Bridge (which ultimately opened in 1981), and identification with Yorkshire and the East Riding remained strong (for example, North Wolds District Council change its name to East Yorkshire Borough Council in the early 1980s, with Beverley also taking the name 'East Yorkshire Borough of Beverley'). This culminated with the local government review in the 1990s, which saw Humberside abolished and the northern part form two unitary authorities.

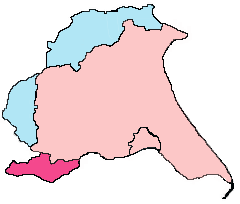
East Riding of Yorkshire boundaries – historic riding (pink and blue), modern county (pink & red)

The East Riding district was formed on 1 April 1996 from the former districts of East Yorkshire, Beverley and Holderness, along with the northern part of the Boothferry district, including the Goole area which forms part of the historic West Riding (attaching it to the districts of Selby or Doncaster were proposed but rejected). The ceremonial county, the area in which the Lord Lieutenant of the East Riding of Yorkshire represents the Crown, was re-established the same day, covering Hull as well as the district.

== Archaeology ==
The East Riding has two quite distinctive and contrasting archaeological areas, the Yorkshire Wolds and the Humber Wetlands. The Yorkshire Wolds form an upland arc of chalk hills stretching from Flamborough head on the coast to the Humber Estuary at its southern end. The Humber Wetlands consist of all the land in the Humber basin that lies below 10 metres above sea level which encompasses a large part of Holderness and the valleys of the Rivers Hull and Derwent and the lower part of the River Ouse valley.

The Arctic conditions associated with the last ice age started to improve and the climate gradually became warmer about 10,000 BC. This warming-up process suffered several temporary setbacks as short, cool spells occurred which disrupted the overall momentum. By about 9,000 BC the vegetation had changed from tundra to a closed woodland, of pine and birch.

Evidence from Gransmoor, to the east of Driffield, in Holderness indicates that Late Palaeolithic people were present in East Yorkshire during the climatic transition. In 1992, a small barbed antler harpoon point was found lodged in a preserved log, thought to be either birch or rowan. This find has been dated to around 9,500 BC.

Between 8,300 and 4,000 BC, Mesolithic communities occupied the area. In the GreatWold Valley, at Willow Garth, to the west of Boynton, pollen samples of Mesolithic date, indicate that the forest cover in this area was being altered by man, and that open grasslands were being made to create grazing areas to which animals would be attracted thus making hunting easier.

In the Yorkshire Wolds there are thousands of Iron Age square barrows and hundreds of farmsteads and settlements, droveways, tracks and field systems. There is a profusion of Neolithic, Bronze Age, Iron Age and Romano-British sites extending across the entire Wolds area. Some Mesolithic sites are known on the chalklands of the Yorkshire Wolds, at Craike Hill (Eastburn Warren), Garton Slack, Huggate Dykes, Huggate Wold, and Octon Wold. The Yorkshire Wolds has a wide range of favourable natural resources and so became a major focus for human settlement during the Neolithic period. Two of the most recently excavated earthen long barrows in the region are to be found at Fordon, on Willerby Wold, and at Kilham, both of which have provided radiocarbon dates of around 3,700 BC. An extensive Neolithic ritual complex, the principal elements of which are four large cursus monuments and a henge, is situated near the eastern end of the Great Wold Valley. More than 1,400 Bronze Age round barrows, are known to exist on the Yorkshire Wolds, occurring either in isolation or, more usually, grouped together to form cemeteries. In the Iron Age the distinctive local tradition known as the Arras Culture emerged and was named after the type-site, found near Market Weighton, and excavated in 1815–17. Romano British villa sites are known on the Wolds at Rudston, Harpham, Brantingham, Welton, and Wharram-le-Street. Anglo-Saxon cemeteries are known from East Yorkshire.

The Humber Wetlands Project which took place between 1992 and 2001 identified numerous prehistoric wetland sites in Holderness, the Hull Valley, the Humberhead Levels and the Vale of York. A boat found at North Ferriby, near Kingston upon Hull, has been dated as 2030 BC, which makes it the oldest of its kind in western Europe. New scientific research carried out on the remains shows it is at least 4,000 years old. The boat was one of three discovered by amateur archaeologist Ted Wright on the banks of the Humber. Historians knew that the boats were old, but only now do they know how old. New scientific techniques suggest the boat Mr Wright found in 1963 is 500 years older than everyone thought. That means it date backs more than 4,000 years to the early Bronze Age. The Ferriby site was an ideal point of departure for east/west travel along the Humber or as a crossing-point to the south bank. The Ferriby Boats were a means by which ideas, such as the decorative design of pottery, and goods such as Baltic amber and metals could arrive on the Humber shore. It has also been suggested that it may have been used to carry stones to Stonehenge.

== Norman period ==
The Battle of Stamford Bridge took place at the village of Stamford Bridge, East Riding of Yorkshire on 25 September 1066. In the battle the majority of the invading Norwegian forces were killed by the forces of King Harold Godwinson of England. It was the final fall of the Vikings in England. A fortnight after the battle, on 14 October 1066, after having marched his forces to the south coast of England, Harold was defeated and killed by Norman forces under William the Conqueror at the Battle of Hastings. This began the Norman Conquest of England.

In Holderness the extensive Lordship was granted by King William I of England to Drogo de la Beuvirere, a Flemish follower. Drogo built a castle at Skipsea before 1087 but he was disgraced and his estates were confiscated by the king. The area was then given to Odo, Count of Champagne, but was taken from him when he rebelled against King William II of England in 1095. It was returned to Odo's son Stephen of Aumale in 1102. Large estates in Holderness were held by the Bishop of Durham and the Archbishop of York. Other large landowners in the area included the abbeys of Meaux and Thornton and the priories of Swine, Nunkeeling and Bridlington. These ecclesiastical estates were confiscated and became crown property when King Henry VIII of England dissolved the monasteries in the 16th century. The Yorkshire Wolds is rich in medieval sites, and is particularly well known for its deserted villages, like those at Wharram Percy and Cottam. Settlement on the Wolds during the medieval period was concentrated on the most suitable agricultural soils. The two major settlement zones are, the Great Wold Valley villages, such as Helperthorpe, Weaverthorpe, Butterwick, Foxholes, Burton Flemming and Rudston, and the east-facing slope of the Wolds including villages such as Carnaby, Haisthorpe, Thornholme, Burton Agnes, and Nafferton, all of which are sited so as to take advantage of a ration of both heavier and lighter agricultural soils.
