= List of civil parishes in the East Riding of Yorkshire =

Civil parishes with town status in the East Riding of Yorkshire.

This is a list of civil parishes in the ceremonial county of the East Riding of Yorkshire, England. There are 172 civil parishes.

== East Riding of Yorkshire ==
The former Bull Fort civil parish is the only unparished land in the East Riding of Yorkshire outside of Hull.

Name	Status	Former local authority	Map	Refs
Airmyn	Civil parish	Goole Rural District		
Aldbrough	Civil parish	Holderness Rural District		
Allerthorpe	Civil parish	Pocklington Rural District		
Anlaby with Anlaby Common	Civil parish	Haltemprice Urban District		
Asselby	Civil parish	Howden Rural District		
Atwick	Civil parish	Holderness Rural District		
Bainton	Civil parish	Driffield Rural District		
Barmby Moor	Civil parish	Pocklington Rural District		
Barmby on the Marsh	Civil parish	Howden Rural District		
Barmston	Civil parish	Bridlington Rural District		
Beeford	Civil parish	Driffield Rural District		
Bempton	Civil parish	Bridlington Rural District		
Beswick	Civil parish	Beverley Rural District		
Beverley	Town	Beverley Municipal Borough		
Bewholme	Civil parish	Holderness Rural District		
Bielby	Civil parish	Pocklington Rural District		
Bilton	Civil parish	Holderness Rural District		
Bishop Burton	Civil parish	Beverley Rural District		
Bishop Wilton	Civil parish	Pocklington Rural District		
Blacktoft	Civil parish	Howden Rural District		
Boynton	Civil parish	Bridlington Rural District		
Brandesburton	Civil parish	Holderness Rural District		
Brantingham	Civil parish	Beverley Rural District		
Bridlington	Town	Bridlington Municipal Borough		
Broomfleet	Civil parish	Howden Rural District		
Bubwith	Civil parish	Howden Rural District		
Bugthorpe	Civil parish	Pocklington Rural District		
Burstwick	Civil parish	Holderness Rural District		
Burton Agnes	Civil parish	Bridlington Rural District		
Burton Constable	Civil parish	Holderness Rural District		
Burton Fleming	Civil parish	Bridlington Rural District		
Burton Pidsea	Civil parish	Holderness Rural District		
Carnaby	Civil parish	Bridlington Rural District		
Catton	Civil parish	Pocklington Rural District		
Catwick	Civil parish	Holderness Rural District		
Cherry Burton	Civil parish	Beverley Rural District		
Coniston	Civil parish	Holderness Rural District		
Cottam	Civil parish	Driffield Rural District		
Cottingham	Civil parish	Haltemprice Urban District		
Cottingwith	Civil parish	Pocklington Rural District		
Dalton Holme	Civil parish	Beverley Rural District		
Driffield	Town	Driffield Urban District		
Easington	Civil parish	Holderness Rural District		
East Garton	Civil parish	Holderness Rural District		
Eastrington	Civil parish	Howden Rural District		
Ellerby	Civil parish	Holderness Rural District		
Ellerker	Civil parish	Beverley Rural District		
Ellerton	Civil parish	Howden Rural District		
Elloughton cum Brough	Civil parish	Beverley Rural District		
Elstronwick	Civil parish	Holderness Rural District		
Etton	Civil parish	Beverley Rural District		
Everingham	Civil parish	Pocklington Rural District		
Fangfoss	Civil parish	Pocklington Rural District		
Fimber	Civil parish	Driffield Rural District		
Flamborough	Civil parish	Bridlington Rural District		
Foggathorpe	Civil parish	Howden Rural District		
Foston	Civil parish	Driffield Rural District		
Fridaythorpe	Civil parish	Driffield Rural District		
Full Sutton	Civil parish	Pocklington Rural District		
Garton	Civil parish	Driffield Rural District		
Gilberdyke	Civil parish	Howden Rural District		
Goodmanham	Civil parish	Pocklington Rural District		
Goole	Town	Goole Municipal Borough		
Goole Fields	Civil parish	Goole Rural District		
Gowdall	Civil parish	Goole Rural District		
Grindale	Civil parish	Bridlington Rural District		
Halsham	Civil parish	Holderness Rural District		
Harpham	Civil parish	Driffield Rural District		
Hatfield	Civil parish	Holderness Rural District		
Hayton	Civil parish	Pocklington Rural District		
Hedon	Town	Hedon Municipal Borough		
Hessle	Town	Haltemprice Urban District		
Hollym	Civil parish	Holderness Rural District		
Holme upon Spalding Moor	Civil parish	Howden Rural District		
Holmpton	Civil parish	Holderness Rural District		
Hook	Civil parish	Goole Rural District		
Hornsea	Town	Hornsea Urban District		
Hotham	Civil parish	Howden Rural District		
Howden	Town	Howden Rural District		
Huggate	Civil parish	Pocklington Rural District		
Humbleton	Civil parish	Holderness Rural District		
Hutton Cranswick	Civil parish	Driffield Rural District		
Kelk	Civil parish	Driffield Rural District		
Keyingham	Civil parish	Holderness Rural District		
Kilham	Civil parish	Driffield Rural District		
Kilpin	Civil parish	Howden Rural District		
Kirby Underdale	Civil parish	Pocklington Rural District		
Kirk Ella	Civil parish	Haltemprice Urban District		
Kirkburn	Civil parish	Driffield Rural District		
Langtoft	Civil parish	Driffield Rural District		
Laxton	Civil parish	Howden Rural District		
Leconfield	Civil parish	Beverley Rural District		
Leven	Civil parish	Beverley Rural District		
Lockington	Civil parish	Beverley Rural District		
Londesborough	Civil parish	Pocklington Rural District		
Lund	Civil parish	Beverley Rural District		
Mappleton	Civil parish	Holderness Rural District		
Market Weighton	Town	Pocklington Rural District		
Melbourne	Civil parish	Pocklington Rural District		
Middleton	Civil parish	Driffield Rural District		
Millington	Civil parish	Pocklington Rural District		
Molescroft	Civil parish	Beverley Rural District		
Nafferton	Civil parish	Driffield Rural District		
Newbald	Civil parish	Beverley Rural District		
Newport	Civil parish	Howden Rural District		
Newton on Derwent	Civil parish	Pocklington Rural District		
North Cave	Civil parish	Howden Rural District		
North Dalton	Civil parish	Driffield Rural District		
North Ferriby	Civil parish	Beverley Rural District		
North Frodingham	Civil parish	Driffield Rural District		
Nunburnholme	Civil parish	Pocklington Rural District		
Ottringham	Civil parish	Holderness Rural District		
Patrington	Civil parish	Holderness Rural District		
Paull	Civil parish	Holderness Rural District		
Pocklington	Town	Pocklington Rural District		
Pollington	Civil parish	Goole Rural District		
Preston	Civil parish	Holderness Rural District		
Rawcliffe	Civil parish	Goole Rural District		
Reedness	Civil parish	Goole Rural District		
Rimswell	Civil parish	Holderness Rural District		
Rise	Civil parish	Holderness Rural District		
Riston	Civil parish	Holderness Rural District		
Roos	Civil parish	Holderness Rural District		
Routh	Civil parish	Beverley Rural District		
Rowley	Civil parish	Beverley Rural District		
Rudston	Civil parish	Bridlington Rural District		
Sancton	Civil parish	Pocklington Rural District		
Seaton	Civil parish	Holderness Rural District		
Seaton Ross	Civil parish	Pocklington Rural District		
Shipton Thorpe	Civil parish	Pocklington Rural District		
Sigglesthorne	Civil parish	Holderness Rural District		
Skeffling	Civil parish	Holderness Rural District		
Skerne and Wansford	Civil parish	Driffield Rural District		
Skidby	Civil parish	Beverley Rural District		
Skipsea	Civil parish	Bridlington Rural District		
Skirlaugh	Civil parish	Holderness Rural District		
Skirpenbeck	Civil parish	Pocklington Rural District		
Sledmere	Civil parish	Driffield Rural District		
Snaith and Cowick	Town	Goole Rural District		
South Cave	Civil parish	Beverley Rural District		
South Cliffe	Civil parish	Pocklington Rural District		
Spaldington	Civil parish	Howden Rural District		
Sproatley	Civil parish	Holderness Rural District		
Stamford Bridge	Civil parish	Pocklington Rural District		
Sunk Island	Civil parish	Holderness Rural District		
Sutton upon Derwent	Civil parish	Pocklington Rural District		
Swanland	Civil parish	Beverley Rural District		
Swine	Civil parish	Holderness Rural District		
Swinefleet	Civil parish	Goole Rural District		
Thorngumbald	Civil parish	Holderness Rural District		
Thornton	Civil parish	Pocklington Rural District		
Thwing	Civil parish	Bridlington Rural District		
Tibthorpe	Civil parish	Driffield Rural District		
Tickton	Civil parish	Beverley Rural District		
Twin Rivers	Civil parish	Goole Rural District		
Ulrome	Civil parish	Bridlington Rural District		
Walkington	Civil parish	Beverley Rural District		
Warter	Civil parish	Pocklington Rural District		
Watton	Civil parish	Driffield Rural District		
Wawne	Civil parish	Beverley Rural District		
Welton	Civil parish	Beverley Rural District		
Welwick	Civil parish	Holderness Rural District		
Wetwang	Civil parish	Driffield Rural District		
Wilberfoss	Civil parish	Pocklington Rural District		
Willerby	Civil parish	Haltemprice Urban District		
Withernsea	Town	Withernsea Urban District		
Withernwick	Civil parish	Holderness Rural District		
Wold Newton	Civil parish	Bridlington Rural District		
Woodmansey	Civil parish	Beverley Rural District; Haltemprice Urban District		
Wressle	Civil parish	Howden Rural District		
Yapham	Civil parish	Pocklington Rural District		

== Kingston upon Hull ==
Unparished area of Kingston upon Hull shown in the East Riding of Yorkshire

The former Kingston upon Hull County Borough is unparished.

== See also ==
- List of civil parishes in England
