= History of local government in Yorkshire =

The history of local government in Yorkshire is unique and complex. Yorkshire is the largest historic English county and consists of a diverse mix of urban and rural development with a heritage in agriculture, manufacturing, and mining. After a long period with little change, it has been subject to a number of reforms of local government structures in modern times, some of which were controversial. The most significant of these were the Local Government Act 1972, the 1990s UK local government reform, and the Localism Act 2011. The historic area currently corresponds to several counties and districts and is mostly contained within the Yorkshire and the Humber region.

== Ancient divisions ==
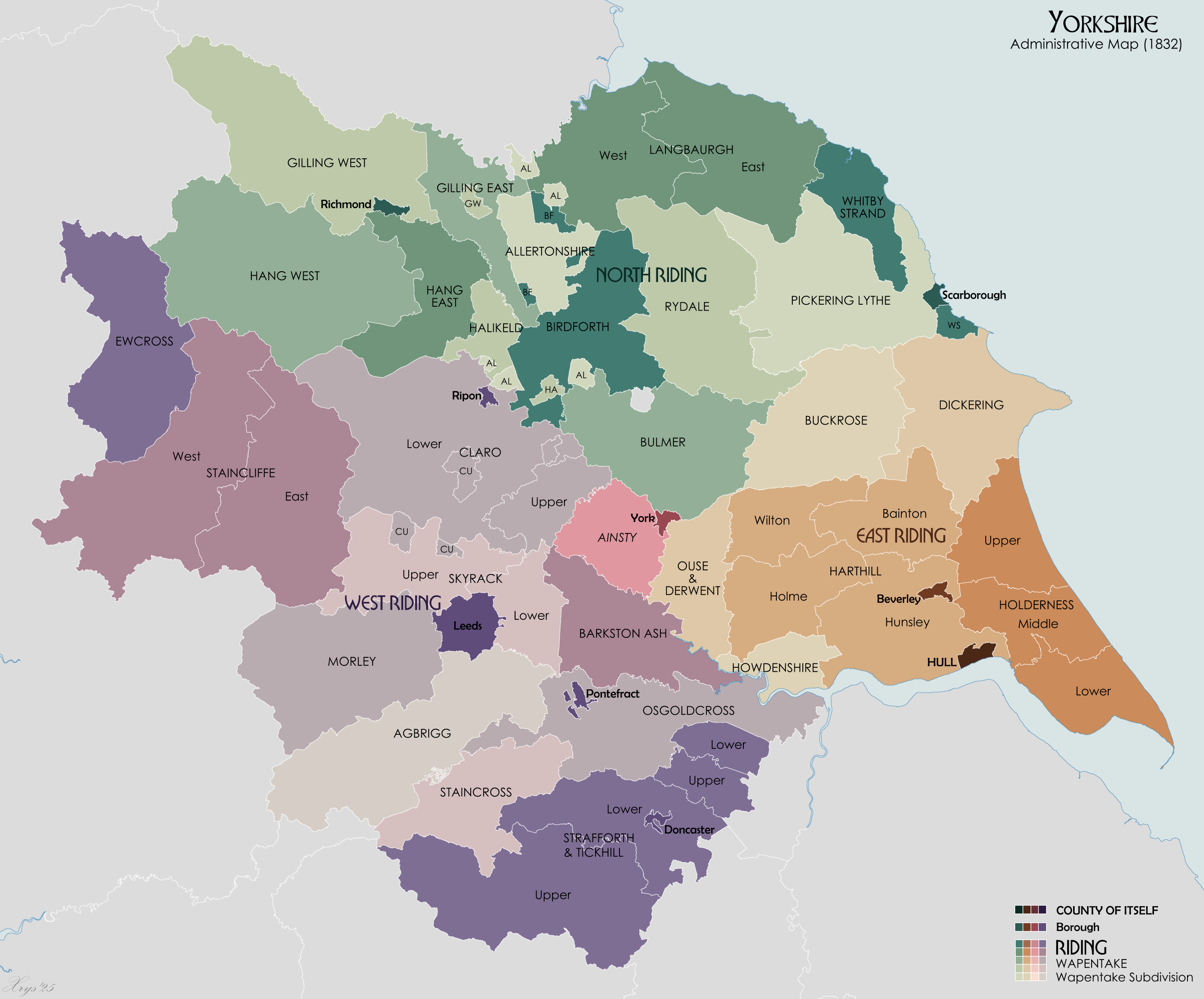
Yorkshire in 1832

Yorkshire originated in antiquity as the Kingdom of Jórvík. It was traditionally divided into West, North and East ridings. The term originates from Old Norse þriðing, "third part", a legacy of the area's 9th century Scandinavian settlers. Each of the ridings was then further subdivided into smaller units called wapentakes, which were administered by an early form of democratic representation termed a "Thing". Later the wapentakes were used as the basis for administration. In about 1823 the wapentakes were:

| Riding | Wapentakes |
|---|---|
| East | Buckrose, Dickering, Harthill – (Bainton beacon, Holme beacon, Hunsley beacon and Wilton beacon), Holderness – (North, Middle and South), Howdenshire, Hullshire, Ouse and Derwent |
| North | Allertonshire, Birdforth, Bulmer, Gilling East and West, Halikeld, Hang East and West, Langbaurgh East and Langbaurgh West, Pickering Lythe, Ryedale, Whitby Strand, City Of York |
| West | Agbrigg and Morley (Agbrigg and Morley divisions), Barkston Ash, Ewcross, Claro Lower and Upper, Morley, Osgoldcross, Skyrack Lower and Upper, Staincliffe East and West, Staincross, Strafforth and Tickhill Lower and Upper |

Apart from these was the Ainsty wapentake to the west of the City of York.

== Modern local government ==
1904 map of Yorkshire

The borough corporations of Beverley, Doncaster, Kingston upon Hull, Leeds, Pontefract, Richmond, Ripon, Scarborough and York were reformed by the Municipal Corporations Act 1835. In 1889, as part of the Local Government Act 1888, Yorkshire was divided into three administrative counties (each with a county council) and county boroughs. The administrative counties closely followed the three ancient ridings, with the exclusion of the large towns of Bradford, Halifax, Huddersfield, Kingston upon Hull, Leeds, Middlesbrough, Sheffield and York. Yorkshire continued to be classed as a single county under the act, although each of the ridings retained their own lieutenancies and shrievalties. York became associated with the West Riding for this purpose. Yorkshire was of unwieldy size to have a single county council, lieutenancy and shrievalty for the whole of it. In 1894 the remainder of the county, that was not a county borough or municipal ('non-county') borough, was divided into urban and rural districts by the Local Government Act 1894 (56 & 57 Vict. c. 73). Several new county boroughs were created from 1889 to 1974:

| Riding | Headquarters | County boroughs in 1889 | New county boroughs |
|---|---|---|---|
| East | Beverley | Kingston upon Hull | none |
| North | Northallerton | Middlesbrough (abolished 1968) | Teesside (1968) |
| West | Wakefield | Bradford, Halifax, Huddersfield, Leeds, Sheffield, York | Barnsley (1913), Dewsbury (1913), Doncaster (1927), Rotherham (1902), Wakefield (1915) |

The North Riding gained 6,252 acres (25.30 km^{2}) from County Durham when the Teesside county borough was created in 1968.

=== Distribution of population in 1971 ===
With the creation and growth of county boroughs, and a movement of people from the country to the towns and cities, the population in the county boroughs began to outnumber those in the administrative counties. By 1971, 53% of the population of Yorkshire were living in the county boroughs. The division of population in 1971 was as follows:

| Riding | Administrative county | County boroughs | Total |
|---|---|---|---|
| East | 257,340 | 285,969 | 543,309 |
| North | 329,423 | 396,233 | 725,656 |
| West | 1,793,473 | 1,991,540 | 3,785,013 |
| Total | 2,380,236 | 2,673,742 | 5,053,978 |

== Changes in 1974 ==
Local government in England was reformed in 1974 by the Local Government Act 1972. Under the act, the ridings lost their lieutenancies and shrievalties and the administrative counties, county boroughs and their councils were abolished. The area of Yorkshire was divided between a number of metropolitan and non-metropolitan counties:

| County after 1974 | Existing area |
|---|---|
| Cleveland (south Tees) | Parts of the North Riding including the County Borough of Teesside |
| Cumbria (part only) | Sedbergh Rural District from the West Riding |
| Durham (part only) | Startforth Rural District from the North Riding |
| Greater Manchester (part only) | Saddleworth Urban District from the West Riding |
| Humberside (northern part) | Kingston upon Hull and most of the East Riding plus Goole from the West Riding |
| Lancashire (part only) | Bowland Rural District, Barnoldswick, Earby, and part of Skipton Rural District from the West Riding |
| North Yorkshire | York; most of the North Riding; Harrogate, Knaresborough and Selby from the West Riding; and part of the East Riding around Filey |
| South Yorkshire | Barnsley, Doncaster, Sheffield and Rotherham from the West Riding |
| West Yorkshire | Bradford, Dewsbury, Halifax, Huddersfield, Leeds and Wakefield from the West Riding |

The reform sought to amalgamate the urbanised parts of the West Riding in the South and West Yorkshire metropolitan counties. The other counties, known as non-metropolitan or shire counties, recognised the urbanised areas that had developed around the River Tees and the Humber, leaving North Yorkshire as a predominantly rural county. The metropolitan and non-metropolitan counties also became counties for purposes such as lieutenancy.

=== Royal Mail reaction ===
The Royal Mail adopted South, North and West Yorkshire as postal counties in 1974. It also recognised the transfers from Yorkshire to Cumbria, Durham and Lancashire and the creation of Cleveland. In Humberside, the part from Yorkshire became the North Humberside postal county. Greater Manchester could not be adopted as a postal county, so Saddleworth (which was part of the Oldham post town) was included in the Lancashire postal county. Postal counties are no longer in official use.

=== District name changes ===
Some changes were unpopular, and a provision of the 1972 act allowed district councils to change the names of their districts. Within Humberside, the Borough of Beverley was changed to East Yorkshire Borough of Beverley and North Wolds district was changed to East Yorkshire in 1981, reflecting their historic association with Yorkshire.

=== Abolition of county councils ===
In 1986 the county councils of South Yorkshire and West Yorkshire were abolished and their functions transferred to district councils.

== 1990s UK local government reform ==
A review of local government took place during the 1990s which made a number of changes to the counties created in 1974. As part of the review, Cleveland and Humberside were abolished in 1996 and their districts were reconstituted as unitary authorities. In addition to becoming a unitary authority, the East Riding of Yorkshire was reintroduced as a county for the purposes of lieutenancy and shrievalty (also including Hull) and North Yorkshire gained territory for this purpose; the changes to the ceremonial counties were reconfirmed by the Lieutenancies Act 1997. The unitary districts created are as follows:

| Unitary authority | County from 1974 to 1996 | Ceremonial county from 1996 |
|---|---|---|
| East Riding of Yorkshire | Humberside: Beverley, Boothferry (part), East Yorkshire, Holderness | East Riding of Yorkshire |
| Hull | Humberside: Hull | East Riding of Yorkshire |
| Middlesbrough | Cleveland: Middlesbrough | North Yorkshire |
| Redcar and Cleveland | Cleveland: Langbaurgh | North Yorkshire |
| Stockton-on-Tees | Cleveland: Stockton-on-Tees | North Yorkshire and County Durham |
| York | North Yorkshire: York and parts of Selby, Harrogate and Ryedale | North Yorkshire |

== 2000s possible North Yorkshire reorganisation ==
In 2003 the government put forward further proposals to restructure local government in North Yorkshire as part of proposals for regional assemblies. This was to replace the two-tier North Yorkshire council structure with a single tier of unitary authorities within a directly elected regional assembly, and would also address the drastic loss of population of Ryedale council where 50% of its population had been absorbed into an enlarged York.

=== Proposed options ===
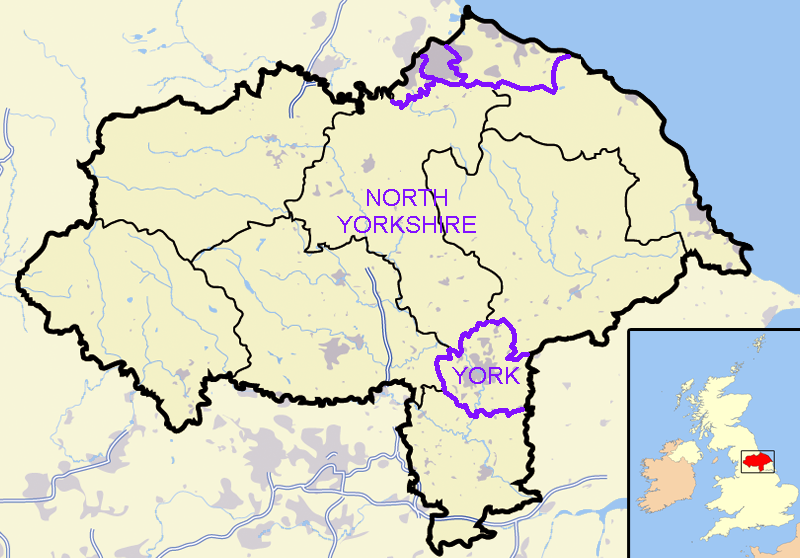
Single unitary county council

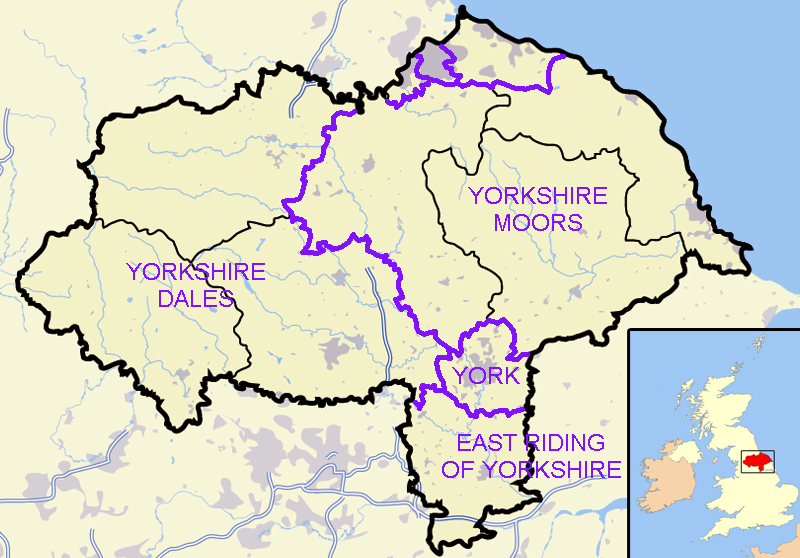
Two unitary authorities

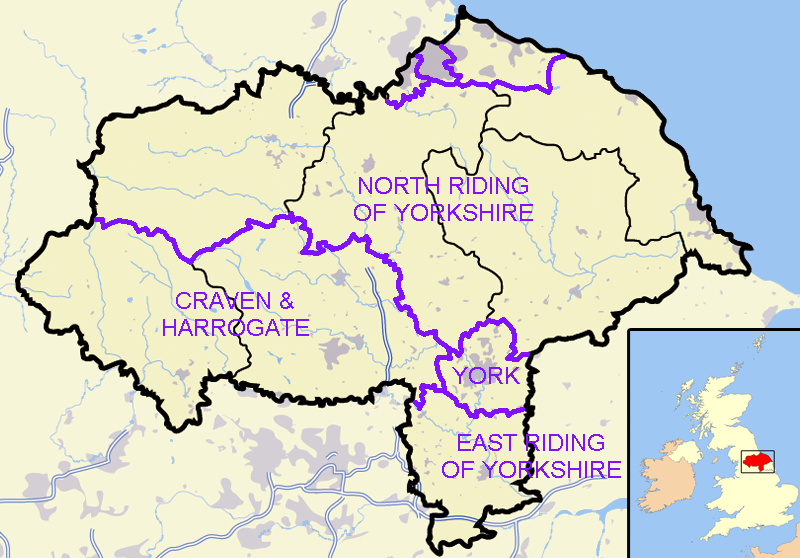
Two unitary authorities

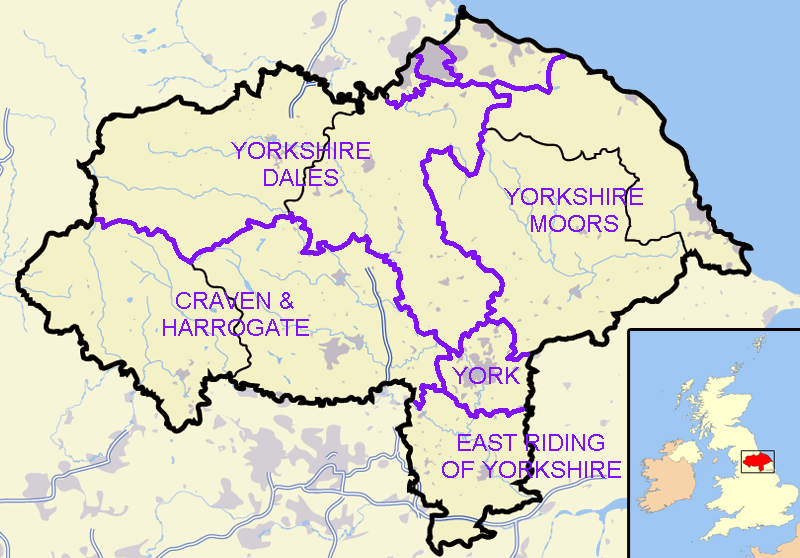
Three unitary authorities

With the proposals for larger unitary district councils Selby council would have been merged with the unitary East Riding of Yorkshire council. The City of York council had become an expanded unitary council in 1996.

In the first stage of consultations, North Yorkshire County Council supported the unitary county option, with the districts all arguing for the status quo, though with Scarborough acknowledging strengths of merging with Ryedale.

After initial consultation, the government adopted the single unitary county council option for second stage consultation. In part due to the unpopularity of the regional assembly that would also go with any reorganisation, the proposals were dropped. The proposals were revived in 2007, but after consultation were again dropped.

== 2020s North Yorkshire reorganisation ==
In 2020 the government instructed the councils in North Yorkshire to put forward options for reorganisation into unitary areas.

=== Proposed options ===
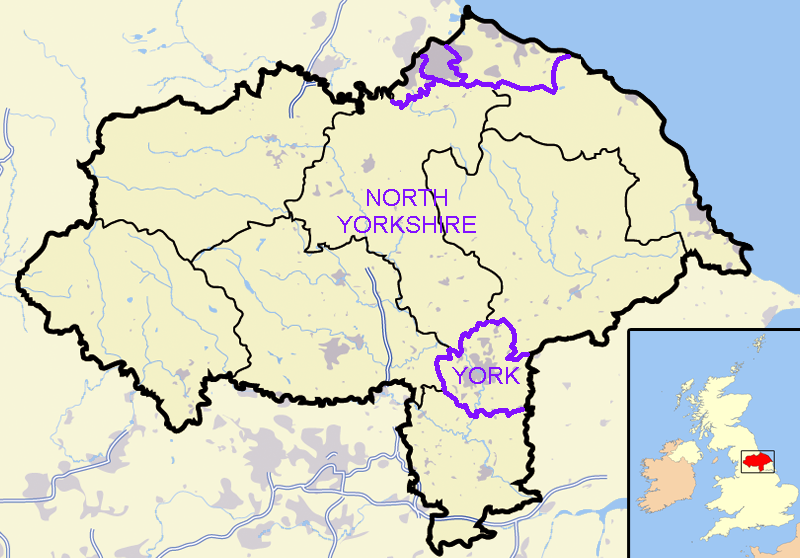
Single unitary county council

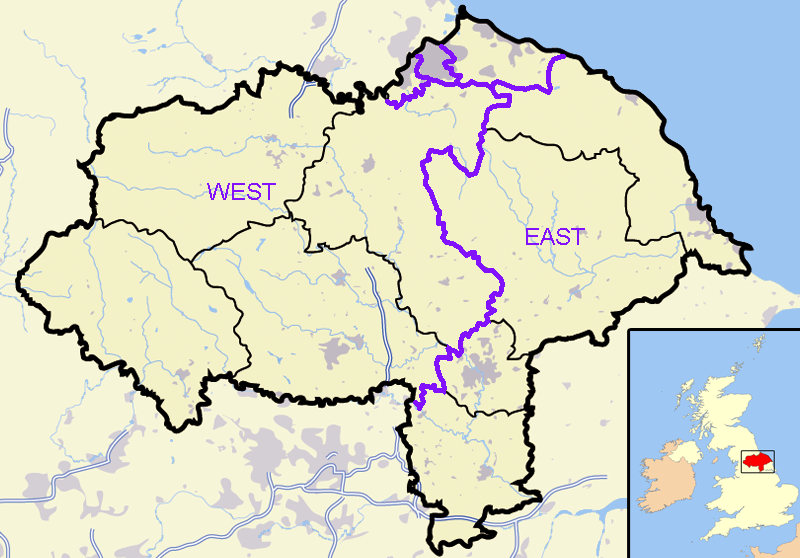
Two unitary authorities

North Yorkshire County Council put forward essentially the same option that they had proposed in 2007 and 2003, a unitary North Yorkshire and the existing unitary City of York. This option was supported by the City of York. Six of the seven districts (all but Hambleton) jointly put forward a proposal to split the county east/west and merge York into the eastern council. Consultation on the two options started on 22 March 2021 with the normal May 2021 county council elections (and district council elections in Craven) abolished.

=== Government decision ===
On 21 July 2021, the Ministry of Housing, Communities and Local Government announced that in April 2023, the non-metropolitan county would be reorganised into a unitary authority. The county council and the seven district councils were to be abolished and their functions transferred to a single authority. The existing unitary authority for the City of York was not being altered.

== Combined authorities ==
To recreate strategic authorities lost when metropolitan county councils were abolished in 1986, combined authorities have been created since 2014. The combined authority for South Yorkshire, formed in 2014, was initially known as Sheffield City Region Combined Authority and was renamed South Yorkshire Mayoral Combined Authority in 2021. West Yorkshire Combined Authority was formed in 2014. Tees Valley Combined Authority was established in 2016. In 2022 the government proposed that a combined authority should be established for York and North Yorkshire, covering all the area of North Yorkshire outside the area of Tees Valley Combined Authority.

== Demography ==
The total area and population of Yorkshire from 1831 to 1991 is as follows. The area corresponds to the three ridings until 1971 and to West, North and South Yorkshire from 1981.

| Year | 1831 | 1841 | 1851 | 1861 | 1871 | 1881 | 1891 | 1901 |
| Area (acres) | 3,669,510 | 3,619,790 | 3,826,566 | 3,830,567 | 3,882,851 | 3,880,872 | 3,809,540 | 3,883,979 |
| Population | 1,371,359 | 1,582,001 | 1,761,692 | 2,033,610 | 2,436,355 | 2,837,034 | 3,218,882 | 3,512,838 |

| Year | 1911 | 1921 | 1931 | 1951 | 1961 | 1971 | 1981 | 1991 |
| Area (acres) | 3,886,028 | 3,885,702 | 3,891,967 | 3,897,909 | 3,897,939 | 3,918,656 | 2,942,530 | 2,941,247 |
| Population | 3,897,682 | 4,098,490 | 4,389,679 | 4,622,659 | 4,725,976 | 5,053,989 | 3,967,192 | 3,978,484 |

From 1831 to 1991 there was a rise in population density from 0.4 to 1.4 people per acre.

== See also ==
- History of local government in the United Kingdom
