= Local Government Boundary Commission (1945–1949) =

The Local Government Boundary Commission was established in 1945 to review the boundaries of local authority areas in England and Wales outside the counties of London and Middlesex. The commission produced its report in 1948 which proposed large changes to county-level areas of local government and changes in the structure and division of powers between tiers of administration. The commission's proposals were not acted on, and it was disbanded in 1949.

== Background ==
Alterations to local government boundaries had been suspended with the outbreak of the Second World War in 1939. Previously they had been carried out by a number of processes: county boroughs could be constituted or extended by a local act of Parliament, while county councils were to carry out reviews of county districts (non-county boroughs, urban and rural districts) on a ten yearly cycle. There was no general procedure for adjusting boundaries between administrative counties, or for amalgamating them. The different procedures were not coordinated.

The wartime coalition government published a white paper in January 1945, entitled Local government in England and Wales during the period of reconstruction. The document proposed the establishment of a Local Government Boundary Commission with executive powers to alter council areas, taking over the powers of the county councils and Minister of Health to change areas. In future all proposed changes by local authorities were to be submitted to the commission. The commission was to consider administration in each geographical county (the administrative county plus associated county boroughs) and see if there was a prima facie case for a review. If it felt a review was warranted the commission was to notify the Minister and the relevant county council, who could then require the holding of an inquiry into local government in the county.

The problem of local government in the counties of London and Middlesex were deemed to be a special case, with the extension of the County of London, the probable disappearance of Middlesex and annexing of parts of the surrounding counties envisaged. The commission was not to be allowed to consider these issues, which were to be considered by an "authoritative body" at a later stage. It was recognised that Middlesex contained a number of towns "large enough on any standard for county borough status" but the commissioners were not given the power to "entertain applications for county borough status in the county".

The commission was to have the power to:

- Extend or create county boroughs
- Reduce the status of county boroughs to non-county boroughs
- Merge contiguous county boroughs
- Merge small administrative counties

Local Government (Boundary Commission) Act 1945 (Note: Section 8(1).)
- Act of Parliament
- Parliament of the United Kingdom
- Long title: An Act to provide for the establishment of a Local Government Boundary Commission; to make further provision for the alteration of local government areas in England and Wales exclusive of London; and for purposes connected with the matters aforesaid.
- Citation: 8 & 9 Geo. 6. c. 38
- Territorial extent: United Kingdom

Dates
- Royal assent: 15 June 1945
- Commencement: 15 June 1945 (Note: The Acts of Parliament (Commencement) Act 1793.)
- Repealed: 16 December 1949

Other legislation
- Amends: Local Government Act 1933
- Amended by: Justices of the Peace Act 1949
- Repealed by: Local Government Boundary Commission (Dissolution) Act 1949

Status: Repealed

Text of statute as originally enacted

The decisions of the commission were to be subject to parliamentary review. The proposals in the white paper were enacted as the Local Government (Boundary Commission) Act 1945 (8 & 9 Geo. 6. c. 38). It received the royal assent on the last day in office of the caretaker government that had taken over from the coalition in May. Outside observers considered that the establishment of the commission meant that the government did not intend to make any changes in the basic structure of local government, and noted that the commission lacked the power to recommend radical changes such as the establishment of regional councils.

== Appointment of commissioners ==
Following the 1945 general election, Aneurin Bevan was appointed the Secretary of State for Health in the new Labour government, and took over responsibility for the appointment of the Commission. The five commissioners were appointed by Royal Warrant on 25 October 1945. The chairman was Sir Malcolm Trustram Eve and the deputy chairman Sir John Evelyn Maude. The three other members were Sir George Hammond Etherton, Sir Frederick Rees and Bill Holmes.

The Minister of Health made regulations governing the work of the commission. Any alterations in the status or boundaries of local government areas were to create "individually and collectively effective and convenient units of local government administration." The commission was given nine main factors which were to govern their decisions:

- Community of interest
- Development, or anticipated development
- Economic and industrial characteristics
- Financial resources
- Physical features, including, but not exclusively, suitable boundaries, means of communication, and accessibility of administrative centres and centres of business and social life
- Population size, distribution and characteristics
- Record of administration by local authorities concerned
- Size and shape of the area
- Wishes of the inhabitants

== Work of the commission ==
In April 1946 the commission wrote to county and county borough councils, asking for information on any boundary proposals they were considering. By August they had received replies from 80 of 83 county boroughs and 42 of 61 county councils, stating they were seeking boundary reviews.

Acting on the information they had received, the commission prioritised the review of areas into two categories, "A" and "B". Reviews of areas in category A were to proceed as soon as possible, while the review of category B areas would be held back until July, 1947 (except where they would affect the boundaries of areas in category A).

The first reviews concerned the claims of Dagenham, Ilford, Leyton, Luton, Rochester-Chatham-Gillingham, and Walthamstow for county borough status. Among the category A reviews were the boundaries of Bedfordshire, the areas of Surrey within the Greater London area, and a request by the municipal boroughs of Beckenham and Bromley to form a joint county borough.

=== First report ===
On 22 April 1947, the commission presented its first report to Parliament, covering its work in 1946. The following investigations had been begun:

- Plymouth
- Bootle and Liverpool
- Luton
- Eleven Welsh counties (excluding Glamorgan)
- South-west Essex (East Ham, West Ham, Barking, Chingford, Dagenham, Ilford, Leyton, Romford, Walthamstow, Wanstead and Woodford, Chigwell and Hornchurch)
- Southampton
- Grimsby
- Twelve county boroughs in south and east Lancashire (Blackburn, Bolton, Burnley, Bury, Manchester, Oldham, Rochdale, St Helens, Salford, Warrington and Wigan)
- Part of East Anglia (Cambridgeshire, Huntingdonshire, Isle of Ely, Lincolnshire (Holland, Kesteven and Lindsey), Soke of Peterborough, Rutland, Norfolk and the county boroughs of Great Yarmouth, Lincoln and Norwich)
- Chatham, Gillingham and Rochester
- Dudley, Smethwick, Walsall, West Bromwich and Wolverhampton
- Bath and Bristol
- Cheltenham and Gloucester
- Portsmouth
- Sunderland

In addition, the report recommended the ending of the distinction between (non-county) boroughs, rural districts, and urban districts, with all to become known as "county districts". The privileges granted to boroughs under municipal charters were to be preserved, however.

The commission also sought an amendment of its powers, to extend its power to divide districts to municipal boroughs as well.

It was announced that decisions in the "urgent" category A areas would be given the following month.

=== First recommendations ===
Decisions on the category A areas were announced 1 May 1947:

- Liverpool: The county borough council had sought to annex the county borough of Bootle and the borough of Crosby, the urban districts of Huyton-with-Roby and Litherland and much of West Lancashire and Whiston rural districts. The commission proposed a much smaller extension to include parts of the two rural districts.
- Bootle: The county borough was to be enlarged by gaining the borough of Crosby, the urban districts of Litherland and parts of West Lancashire rural district. The commission felt that without the extensions Bootle would no longer be a viable local government unit.
- Plymouth: the county borough had sought to annex a large area from the two adjoining counties. From Cornwall would have come the borough of Saltash, Torpoint urban district and part of St Germans rural district, and from Devon the entire Plympton St Mary rural district and the southern part of Tavistock rural district. The commission limited its proposed extension to two parishes from the Plympton rural district.
- Hull: The county borough was to be enlarged by the absorption of Haltemprice urban district and parts of Beverley and Holderness rural districts.
- Southampton: Interim recommendations were made to allow the county borough to acquire territory in order to provide housing following wartime damage. The corporation had sought to gain part of the borough of Eastleigh, but the extension was limited to small parts of the rural districts of Romsey and Stockbridge and Winchester.
- Grimsby: The commission deferred a decision on the county borough's boundary. Grimsby corporation sought to annex the adjacent borough of Cleethorpes and much of Grimsby rural district, which would probably have ceased to exist as a result.
- Luton: The borough had sought county borough status and an extension of its boundaries. The commission deferred a decision on the status of the borough, and proposed a small enlargement of its area. Suggestions that the borough should merge with that of Dunstable were rejected.
- Lancashire and North Cheshire: No final decision on the future of fourteen county boroughs in the area were made. If all the requests for extensions had been granted, much of south Lancashire would have been made up entirely of county boroughs, and the commission sought to review the areas around Manchester and Salford before making proposals for the fourteen boroughs.
- Eastern Counties: The commission considered that six administrative counties (Huntingdonshire, Isle of Ely, Holland, Kesteven, Rutland, and Soke of Peterborough) were too small to be effective units, and amalgamations would be necessary.

Two weeks later the commission issued a statement on further proposed changes:

- St Helens: The county borough had asked for an extension to absorb two neighbouring urban districts and six parishes. The commission issued an interim decision, restricting the proposed extension to most of the parish of Windle in the Whiston rural district, as the borough needed land for housing purposes. Further extensions were deferred until the consideration of the wider area.
- Oldham: The commission proposed extending Oldham county borough to absorb Lees urban district and part of Limehurst rural district, the rest of which was to be split between the borough of Ashton-under-Lyne and Failsworth urban district. As in St Helens, this was an interim decision to allow the borough's housing programme to progress.
- South-west Essex: The commission had not made a final decision on the area, but hoped to make a decision on "broad principles" within a year.
- Staffordshire: The commission also hoped to make a decision on seven county boroughs within a year, noting that the Ministry of Town and Country Planning was to carry out a comprehensive planning survey of the geographical county, which might effect local government reforms.

=== Second report ===
The commission's second report was issued in April 1948. It contained a notably strong section outlining the deficiencies with the existing system of local government, and therefore the report made comprehensive proposals for local government areas throughout England, and suggestions for Wales. It was later to be argued that in producing this report, the commission had significantly exceeded its brief.

The commission recommended the creation of:

- 20 one-tier counties (with a target population 200,000 to 1 million)
- 47 two-tier counties (target population 200,000 to 500,000)
- 63 "most-purpose" new county boroughs, which were to be part of the two-tier counties for certain purposes (target population less than 200,000)

==== One-tier counties ====
The proposed one-tier counties were based on twenty large county boroughs, which were to continue to manage all local government services in the area. Two of these counties were to be formed from the amalgamation of a number of existing councils.

1. Birmingham
2. Bradford
3. Bristol
4. Central Sussex (Brighton county borough, Hove municipal borough, and Portslade, Shoreham and Southwick urban districts)
5. Coventry
6. Croydon
7. Derby
8. East Ham
9. Kingston-upon-Hull
10. Leeds
11. Leicester
12. Newcastle upon Tyne
13. North Staffordshire (Stoke-on-Trent county borough, Newcastle-under-Lyme municipal borough, and Kidsgrove urban district)
14. Nottingham
15. Plymouth
16. Portsmouth
17. Sheffield
18. Southampton
19. Sunderland
20. West Ham

==== Two-tier counties ====
The two-tier counties were based on the existing administrative counties. The commission felt that in order to provide effective local government a county must have a population of more than 200,000 and less than a million. From this it followed that a number of small counties would need to be merged, and large ones divided.

The small counties requiring union were: Cambridgeshire, Herefordshire, Huntingdonshire, Isle of Ely, Lincolnshire (Parts of Holland), Lincolnshire (Parts of Kesteven), Rutland, East Suffolk, West Suffolk, Soke of Peterborough, Westmorland and Worcestershire. Although the Isle of Wight was below the population limit it was to be preserved because it was an island and cannot conveniently be united with the mainland."

The large counties needing division were Cheshire, Lancashire, Staffordshire and the West Riding of Yorkshire.

The proposed two-tier counties were as follows:

1. Bedfordshire (unchanged)
2. Berkshire (unchanged)
3. Buckinghamshire (unchanged)
4. Cambridgeshire from the merger of Cambridgeshire, Isle of Ely, Huntingdonshire, Soke of Peterborough and the Newmarket Urban District from West Suffolk
5. Cheshire (reduced in size due to losses of territory to (a) Lancaster South East and Cheshire North East and (b) Lancaster South West and Cheshire North West)
6. Cornwall (unchanged)
7. Cumberland (with Carlisle county borough)
8. Derbyshire
9. Devon (with Exeter county borough)
10. Dorset (with Bournemouth county borough)
11. Durham (with Darlington, Gateshead, South Shields, West Hartlepool county boroughs, but losing territory to North Yorkshire)
12. East Sussex (with Eastbourne and Hastings county boroughs, but losing territory to Central Sussex)
13. Essex (with Southend county borough)
14. Gloucestershire (with Gloucester county borough)
15. Hampshire (renaming of county of Southampton)
16. Hereford and Worcester from the merger of Herefordshire, Worcestershire (less Oldbury to Stafford South), Worcester county borough plus Amblecote Urban District, Staffordshire.
17. Hertfordshire (unchanged)
18. Isle of Wight (unchanged)
19. Kent (with Canterbury county borough)
20. Lancaster Central (including Blackpool, Blackburn, Burnley, Preston and Southport)
21. Lancaster North and Westmorland from Westmorland and north Lancashire (the Furness area)
22. Lancaster South (including St Helens, Wigan, Warrington, Bolton, Bury and Rochdale)
23. Lancaster South East and Cheshire North East (including Manchester, Salford, Stretford, Oldham and Stockport)
24. Lancaster South West and Cheshire North West (Including Liverpool, Bootle, Wallasey and Birkenhead)
25. Leicester from the merger of Leicestershire and Rutland
26. Lincoln South from the merger of Lincolnshire (Parts of Holland) and Lincolnshire (Parts of Kesteven)
27. Lincoln North from the merger of Lincolnshire (Parts of Lindsey) and Grimsby county borough
28. Middlesex (unchanged)
29. Monmouthshire (with Newport county borough)
30. Norfolk (with Great Yarmouth, Norwich county boroughs)
31. Northamptonshire (with Northampton county borough)
32. Northumberland (with Tynemouth county borough)
33. Nottinghamshire (unchanged)
34. Oxfordshire (with Oxford county borough)
35. Salop (unchanged)
36. Somerset (with Bath county borough)
37. Stafford Central
38. Stafford South (including Dudley, Oldbury, Smethwick, Walsall, West Bromwich and Wolverhampton)
39. Suffolk from the merger of East Suffolk and West Suffolk less Newmarket, and Ipswich county borough
40. Surrey (unchanged)
41. Warwickshire (unchanged)
42. West Sussex (less areas lost to Central Sussex)
43. Wiltshire (unchanged)
44. York East (Yorkshire East Riding and York county borough)
45. York North from Yorkshire North Riding, Middlesbrough county borough, and Stockton-on-Tees and Billingham from County Durham
46. York South from part of West Riding of Yorkshire (including Barnsley, Doncaster and Rotherham)
47. York West from most of West Riding of Yorkshire (including Dewsbury, Halifax, Huddersfield and Wakefield)

==== Most-purpose county boroughs ====
The county boroughs proposed by the commission were to be responsible for most local government in their area, only looking to the county councils for large area services. They were a mixture of existing county boroughs and larger non-county boroughs.

1. Barnsley
2. Barrow-in-Furness
3. Bath
4. Birkenhead
5. Blackburn
6. Blackpool
7. Bolton
8. Bootle
9. Bournemouth
10. Burnley
11. Cambridge
12. Carlisle
13. Chatham-Gillingham-Rochester
14. Cheltenham
15. Chesterfield
16. Darlington
17. Doncaster
18. Dudley
19. Exeter
20. Gateshead
21. Gloucester
22. Grimsby
23. Halifax
24. Hastings
25. Huddersfield
26. Ipswich
27. Lincoln
28. Liverpool (Note: Large enough to be a one-tier county, but to be centre of gravity for new county of South West Lancashire and North West Cheshire.)
29. Luton
30. Manchester (Note: Large enough to be a one-tier county, but to be centre of gravity for new county of South East Lancashire and North East Cheshire.)
31. Middlesbrough
32. Newport
33. Northampton
34. Norwich
35. Oldham
36. Oxford
37. Poole
38. Preston
39. Reading
40. Rochdale
41. Rotherham
42. St Helens
43. Salford
44. Smethwick
45. Slough
46. Southend
47. Southport
48. South Shields
49. Stockport
50. Stockton-on-Tees (in North Yorkshire)
51. Stretford
52. Swindon
53. Tynemouth
54. Wallasey
55. Walsall
56. Warrington
57. West Bromwich
58. West Hartlepool
59. Wigan
60. Wolverhampton
61. Worcester
62. Worthing
63. York

==== Wales ====
The commission did not have detailed proposals for Wales. Glamorgan was to remain two-tier, with Merthyr Tydfil as a county borough within it, while Cardiff was to be a one-tier county. No decision had been made on Swansea. The remaining eleven administrative counties were to be grouped as either two, three, four, or five new counties.

=== Third report and abolition ===
On 25 March 1949, the Minister of Health Aneurin Bevan replied to a written question in the House of Commons stating that "it will not be practicable to introduce comprehensive legislation on local government reconstruction in the near future". This meant that the proposals in their previous report would not be carried out, and the commission's annual report for 1948 which followed in April 1949 was therefore reduced to recommending orders under existing legislation. The report also noted that the four proposals for combinations of Welsh counties had been unanimously rejected by the county councils.

On 27 June 1949 a decision to abolish the commission was announced in Parliament. The minister praised the work done by the commission, but noted that it did not have the power under the 1945 act to alter the structure or vary the functions of local government. The government recognised that it was difficult for the commission to continue with its work without considering these factors. It was therefore repealing the act creating the body, restoring the situation for local boundary reviews to that pertaining in 1945. The government was to carry out a review of the structures and functions of local administration, including London, although the Minister was unable to give a date for its commencement. Local government academic Bruce Wood, reviewing the history of the commission nearly 30 years later, remarked that its refusal to be constrained in its 1947 report meant the commission had "committed suicide".

Local Government Boundary Commission (Dissolution) Act 1949 (Note: Section 2.)
- Act of Parliament
- Parliament of the United Kingdom
- Long title: An Act to dissolve the Local Government Boundary Commission and repeal the Local Government (Boundary Commission) Act, 1945; and to make consequential provision as respects certain enactments of the Local Government Act, 1933, which were amended or repealed by the said Act of 1945.
- Citation: 12, 13 & 14 Geo. 6. c. 83
- Territorial extent: United Kingdom

Dates
- Royal assent: 16 December 1949
- Commencement: 16 December 1949 (Note: Section 1(3).)
- Repealed: 23 July 1958

Other legislation
- Amends: Local Government Act 1933; Local Government (Alteration of Areas) (Notices) Regulations 1934
- Repeals/revokes: Local Government (Boundary Commission) Act 1945
- Repealed by: Local Government Act 1958

Status: Repealed

Text of statute as originally enacted

The winding-up of the commission was enacted by the Local Government Boundary Commission (Dissolution) Act 1949 (12, 13 & 14 Geo. 6. c. 83). The planned review never took place. Following the 1950 general election, the Labour government was returned with a small majority. In a debate on local government in the Commons on 17 July 1951, George Lindgren, Parliamentary Secretary for Local Government and Planning stated that the government was waiting for the results of negotiations between the local authority associations. In the absence of such agreement, no legislation could be introduced due to the state of the parties in the House. The Minister of Local Government and Planning Hugh Dalton, added that "the reform of local government was the type of question regarding which, in a parliament like the present, with the Government having a narrow majority, comprehensive legislation was not realistic".

The statement effectively delayed reform until the next parliament, a fact not lost on the commission's former chairman who wrote to The Times bemoaning the fact that "the Government's review of local government structure, which was stated in 1949 to be already in being, appears to have led nowhere. This lack of decision is bad enough for local government, but surely the reconstitution of district authorities, without previous consideration of any of the functions or boundaries of the existing counties and county boroughs, or even any power to consider them simultaneously, would be a farce."

The Labour Party lost power to the Conservatives in the general election of 25 October 1951, and no further review of local government was put forward until the publication of the white papers leading to the Local Government Act 1958 (6 & 7 Eliz. 2. c. 55).
