= Grindale =

Village and civil parish in the East Riding of Yorkshire, England

Coordinates: 54.125100°N 0.269099°W

- Location within the East Riding of Yorkshire
- Population: 98 (2001 census)
- OS grid reference: TA132713
  - London: 180 mi (290 km) S
- Civil parish: Grindale
- Unitary authority: East Riding of Yorkshire
- Ceremonial county: East Riding of Yorkshire
- Region: Yorkshire and the Humber
- Country: England
- Sovereign state: United Kingdom
- Post town: BRIDLINGTON
- Postcode district: YO16
- Dialling code: 01262
- Police: Humberside
- Fire: Humberside
- Ambulance: Yorkshire
- UK Parliament: Bridlington and The Wolds

Grindale is a village and civil parish in the East Riding of Yorkshire, England. It is situated approximately 4 miles (6 km) north-west of Bridlington town centre.

The name Grindale derives from the Old English grēnedæl meaning 'the green dale'.

The village has an airstrip, which is used predominantly for skydiving. It is currently operated by Skydive GB Parachute Club, an approved dropzone of the British Parachute Association.

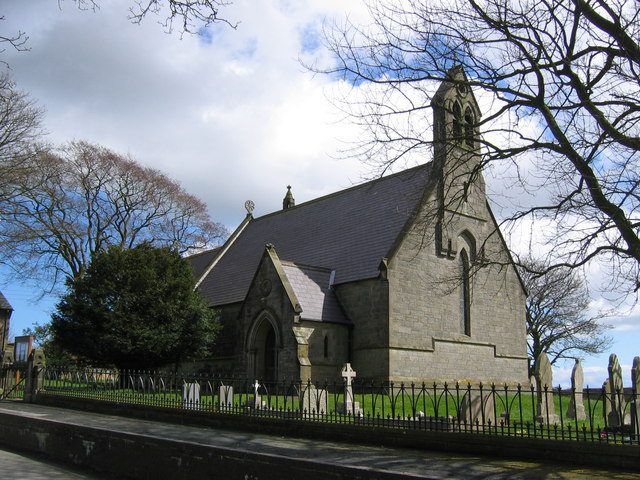
St Nicholas' Church, Grindale

According to the 2001 UK Census, Grindale parish had a population of 98, however the 2011 census grouped the parish with Boynton (2001 pop. 161), giving a total of 229.

In 1823 Grindale (then Grindall), was in the civil parish of Bridlington, the Wapentake of Dickering, and the Liberty of St Peter's. Population at the time was 107, which included six farmers and the parish curate.

Between 1894 and 1974 Grindale was a part of the Bridlington Rural District, in the East Riding of Yorkshire. Between 1974 and 1996 it was part of the Borough of North Wolds (later Borough of East Yorkshire), in the county of Humberside.
