= Glanford =

Former local government district in England

Coordinates: 53.6°N 0.5°W

- Glanford shown within Humberside
- Area
  - 1974: 143,914 acres (582.40 km^{2})
- Population
  - 1973: 59,940
  - 1992: 72,600
- History
  - Created: 1 April 1974
  - Abolished: 1 April 1996
  - Succeeded by: North Lincolnshire
- Status: Non-metropolitan district, borough
- Government
  - HQ: Brigg
  - Motto: Always Ready

Glanford was, from 1974 to 1996, a local government district with borough status in the non-metropolitan county of Humberside, England.

== Creation ==
The district was created on 1 April 1974 as part of a general reform of local government in England and Wales under the Local Government Act 1972. Among the innovations of the 1974 reorganisation was the creation of a new county of Humberside uniting areas of Yorkshire and Lincolnshire previously divided by the Humber estuary. Glanford was one of nine districts into which Humberside was divided.

Glanford was formed by merging three districts, previously part of the administrative county of Lincolnshire - Parts of Lindsey: Barton upon Humber Urban District, Brigg Urban District and Glanford Brigg Rural District. The borough was bounded by Cleethorpes to the east, Lincolnshire to the south, Boothferry to the west, and had a shore on the Humber estuary to the north. It entirely surrounded the Borough of Scunthorpe.

== Abolition ==
Following a review by the Local Government Commission for England, both the County of Humberside and Borough of Glanford were abolished on 1 April 1996. Four unitary authorities replaced both the county council and nine district councils, and Glanford was merged with the Borough of Scunthorpe and part of the Borough of Boothferry to form the unitary authority of North Lincolnshire.

== See also ==
- Glanford Borough Council elections
