= Harry Blanshard Wood =

English recipient of the Victoria Cross

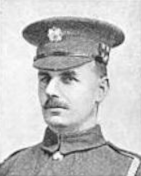
- Born: 21 June 1882; Newton on Derwent, Yorkshire
- Died: 15 August 1924 (aged 42); Bristol
- Burial place: Arnos Vale Cemetery, Bristol
- Military career
- Allegiance: United Kingdom
- Branch: British Army
- Service years: 1903–1918
- Rank: Lance-Sergeant
- Units: Scots Guards
- Conflicts: World War I
- Awards: Victoria Cross; Military Medal

Harry Blanshard Wood, VC, MM (21 June 1882 – 15 August 1924) was an English recipient of the Victoria Cross, the highest and most prestigious award for gallantry in the face of the enemy that can be awarded to British and Commonwealth forces.

== Biography ==
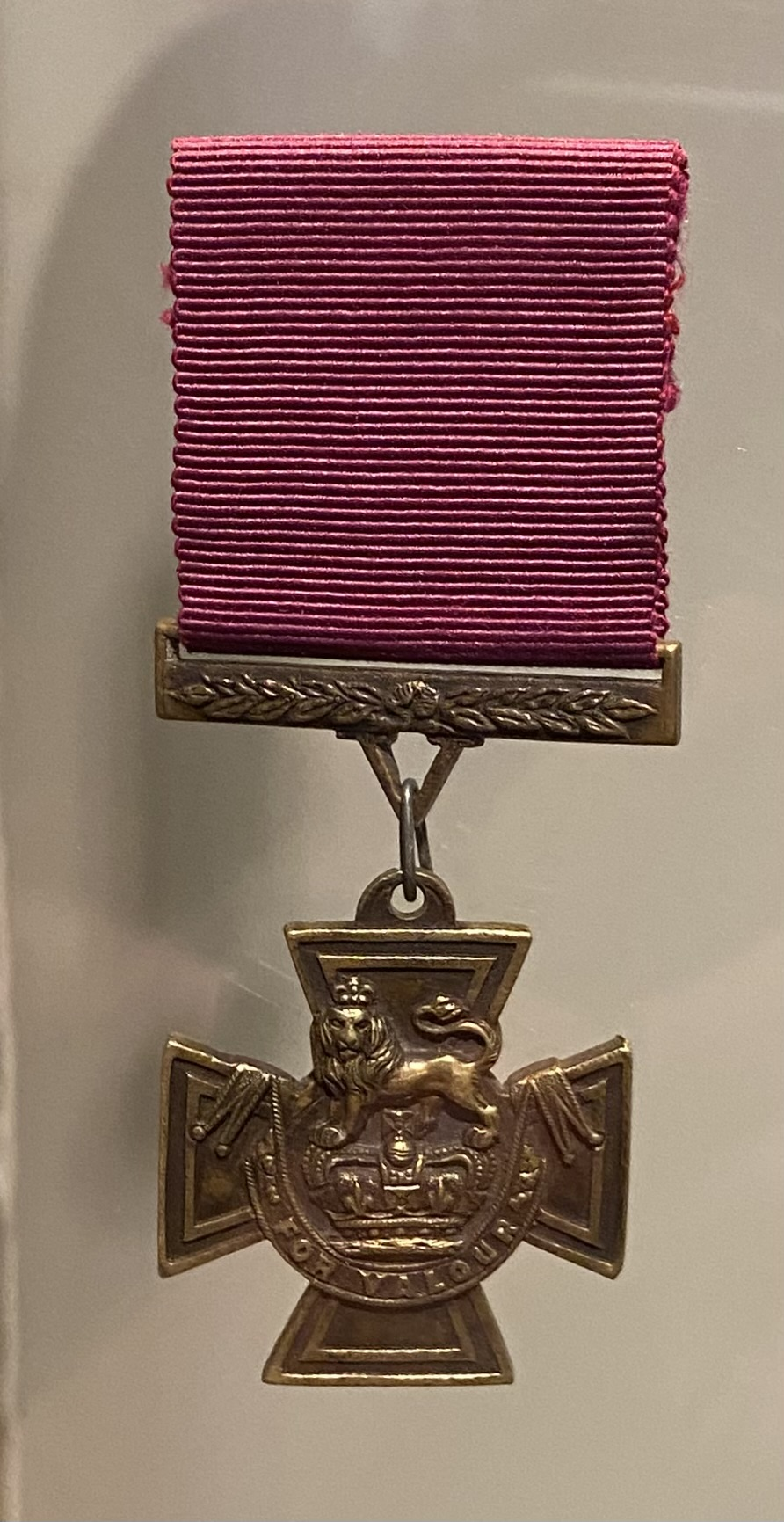
Wood's VC on display at York Castle Museum

Harry Wood was born 21 June 1882 in Newton on Derwent, Yorkshire, the son of John Wood, an agricultural labourer, and Maria Nichol Dey.

At 37 years old, Harry was a corporal in the 2nd Battalion, Scots Guards, British Army during the First World War when the deed for which he was awarded the VC took place. On 13 October 1918 at Saint-Python, France, when the advance was desperately opposed and the streets of the village were raked by fire, Corporal Wood's platoon sergeant was killed and he took command of the leading platoon. The River Selle had to be crossed and the ruined bridge gained, although the space in front of it was full of snipers, so the corporal carried a very large brick into the open space, lay down behind it and, firing continuously on the snipers, covered his men while they worked their way across. Later in the day he repeatedly drove off enemy counter-attacks.

He later achieved the rank of lance-sergeant.

His nerves were badly affected by his wartime experiences. He died 15 August 1924 whilst on holiday; he was walking with his wife when a car mounted the pavement and headed towards them. His wife pushed him out of the way but she was pinned against the wall. She suffered minor injuries but her husband was so shocked that he collapsed and fell into a coma from which he died several days later. He was buried at Arnos Vale Cemetery, Bristol, England, at Soldiers' Corner, grave number 1738.

His Victoria Cross is on display at York Castle Museum.

== Bibliography ==
- Gliddon, Gerald (2014) [2000]. The Final Days 1918. VCs of the First World War. The History Press. ISBN 978-0-7509-5368-9.
- Symbol of Courage - A Complete History of the Victoria Cross (Max Arthur, 2004)
- Whitworth, Alan (2012). Yorkshire VCs. Barnsley: Pen & Sword. ISBN 978-1-84884-778-1.
