= East Yorkshire District Council elections =

Local government elections in Humberside, England

East Yorkshire was a non-metropolitan district in Humberside, England. It was abolished on 1 April 1996 and replaced by East Riding of Yorkshire.

== Political control ==
The first election to the council was held in 1973, initially operating as a shadow authority before coming into its powers on 1 April 1974. Political control of the council from 1974 until its abolition in 1996 was as follows:

Party in control	Years
Independent	1974–1979
Conservative	1979–1991
No overall control	1991–1996

== Council elections ==
- 1973 North Wolds District Council election
- 1976 North Wolds District Council election (New ward boundaries)
- 1979 North Wolds District Council election
- 1983 East Yorkshire District Council election
- 1987 East Yorkshire District Council election
- 1991 East Yorkshire District Council election
