= Holderness Borough Council elections =

Local government elections in Humberside, England

Holderness was a non-metropolitan district in Humberside, England. It was abolished on 1 April 1996 and replaced by East Riding of Yorkshire.

== Political control ==
The first election to the council was held in 1973, initially operating as a shadow authority before coming into its powers on 1 April 1974. Throughout the council's existence, a majority of the seats were held by independent councillors.

Party in control	Years
Independent	1974–1996

== Council elections ==
- 1973 Holderness District Council election
- 1976 Holderness District Council election (New ward boundaries)
- 1979 Holderness Borough Council election
- 1983 Holderness Borough Council election
- 1987 Holderness Borough Council election
- 1991 Holderness Borough Council election
