= Patrington Rural District =

Former local government area in the UK

Coordinates: 53.696°N 0.010°W

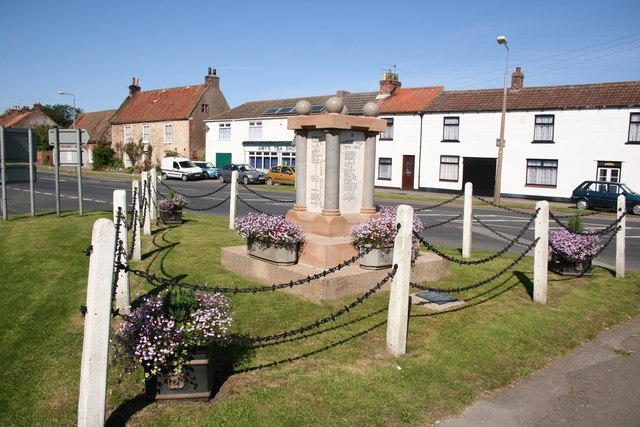
War memorial at Patrington village

Patrington was a rural district in the East Riding of Yorkshire, England, from 1894 to 1935.

The district formed the south-eastern part of the county, stretching from Hedon to Spurn.

The district was created by the Local Government Act 1894.

In 1935 the district was abolished by a County Review Order made under the Local Government Act 1929, and the area then formed part of the newly created Holderness Rural District.

Under the Local Government Act 1972 the area became part of the larger Holderness borough in Humberside. Since 1996 it has formed part of a unitary East Riding of Yorkshire.
