= Arnold, East Riding of Yorkshire =

Hamlet in the East Riding of Yorkshire, England

Coordinates: 53.858337°N 0.289860°W

Arnold
- Location within the East Riding of Yorkshire
- OS grid reference: TA125415
  - London: 160 mi (260 km) S
- Civil parish: Riston
- Unitary authority: East Riding of Yorkshire
- Ceremonial county: East Riding of Yorkshire
- Region: Yorkshire and the Humber
- Country: England
- Sovereign state: United Kingdom
- Post town: HULL
- Postcode district: HU11
- Dialling code: 01964
- Police: Humberside
- Fire: Humberside
- Ambulance: Yorkshire
- UK Parliament: Beverley and Holderness

Arnold is a hamlet in the East Riding of Yorkshire, England in an area known as Holderness. It is situated approximately 9 miles (14 km) north of Hull city centre and 6 miles (10 km) east of Beverley town centre. It lies to the west of the A165 road which by-passes it.

It has one public house, the Bay Horse.

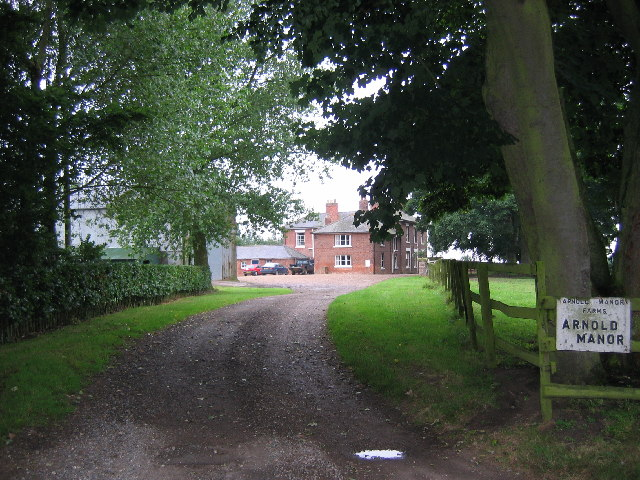
Arnold Manor

Together with the village of Long Riston it forms the civil parish of Riston.

The name "Arnold" derives from the Old English earn and halh, and meant "eagles' nook of land".

== See also ==
- Listed buildings in Riston
