= Scunthorpe Borough Council elections =

Local government elections in Humberside, England

Scunthorpe was a non-metropolitan district in Humberside, England. It was abolished on 1 April 1996 and replaced by North Lincolnshire.

== Political control ==
Prior to 1974, Scunthorpe was a municipal borough within the administrative county of Lindsey. Under the Local Government Act 1972 it became a non-metropolitan district with borough status and was transferred to Humberside, with Humberside County Council providing county-level services. The first election to the reconstituted borough council was held in 1973, initially operating as a shadow authority before coming into its revised powers on 1 April 1974. From 1974 until the council's abolition in 1996, Labour always held a majority of the seats on the council.

| Party in control | Years |
|---|---|
| Labour | 1974–1996 |

== Council elections ==
- 1973 Scunthorpe Borough Council election
- 1976 Scunthorpe Borough Council election (Borough boundary changes took place but the number of seats remained the same)
- 1979 Scunthorpe Borough Council election (New ward boundaries)
- 1980 Scunthorpe Borough Council election
- 1982 Scunthorpe Borough Council election
- 1983 Scunthorpe Borough Council election
- 1984 Scunthorpe Borough Council election
- 1986 Scunthorpe Borough Council election
- 1987 Scunthorpe Borough Council election
- 1988 Scunthorpe Borough Council election
- 1990 Scunthorpe Borough Council election
- 1991 Scunthorpe Borough Council election
- 1992 Scunthorpe Borough Council election
