= Newton upon Derwent =

Village and civil parish in the East Riding of Yorkshire, England

Coordinates: 53.934551°N 0.904508°W

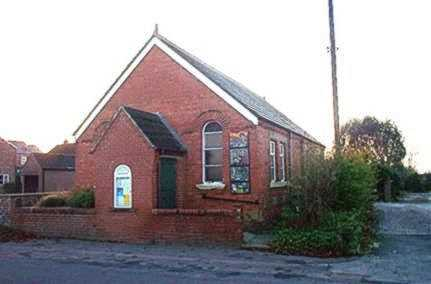
- Newton upon Derwent Community Centre and Methodist Chapel, 2002

- Location within the East Riding of Yorkshire
- Population: 315 (2011 census)
- OS grid reference: SE720492
  - London: 170 mi (270 km) S
- Civil parish: Newton on Derwent
- Unitary authority: East Riding of Yorkshire
- Ceremonial county: East Riding of Yorkshire
- Region: Yorkshire and the Humber
- Country: England
- Sovereign state: United Kingdom
- Post town: YORK
- Postcode district: YO41
- Dialling code: 01904
- Police: Humberside
- Fire: Humberside
- Ambulance: Yorkshire
- UK Parliament: Goole and Pocklington

Newton upon Derwent or Newton on Derwent is a village and civil parish in the East Riding of Yorkshire, England. It is situated approximately 5 miles (8 km) west of Pocklington and 1 mile (1.6 km) south of the A1079 at Wilberfoss. It lies 1 mile east of the River Derwent after which the village takes its name. According to the 2011 UK census, Newton on Derwent parish had a population of 315, an increase on the 2001 UK census figure of 282.

== Governance ==
Newton upon Derwent was historically a township in the ancient parish of Wilberfoss, in 1866, the legal definition of 'parish' was changed to be the areas used for administering the poor laws, and so Newton upon Derwent became a civil parish. In 1894 Newton upon Derwent became part of the Pocklington Rural District, on 1 April 1935 the parish was abolished and merged with Wilberfoss. In 1974 Newton upon Derwent became part of the East Yorkshire non-metropolitan district in the non-metropolitan county of Humberside. On 1 April 1981 it became a separate civil parish under the name "Newton on Derwent". In 1996 it became part of the East Riding of Yorkshire unitary authority area and the ceremonial county of the East Riding of Yorkshire.
