= Brigg Urban District =

Former local government area in the UK

Brigg
- Brigg Urban District shown within Parts of Lindsey in 1970
- Area
  - 1911: 462 acres (1.87 km^{2})
  - 1961: 988 acres (4.00 km^{2})
- Population
  - 1911: 3,343
  - 1961: 4,912
- History
  - Created: 1894
  - Abolished: 1974
  - Succeeded by: Glanford
- Status: Urban District
- Government: Brigg Urban District Council
  - HQ: Brigg

Brigg was an urban district in Parts of Lindsey, Lincolnshire, England, from 1894 to 1974. It was created under the Local Government Act 1894.

It was enlarged in 1936 when parts of the civil parishes of Bigby and Wrawby were transferred to the district.

The district was abolished in 1974 under the Local Government Act 1972 and combined with the Barton upon Humber Urban District and Glanford Brigg Rural District to form the new Glanford district in Humberside. Glanford was subsequently abolished in 1996 and replaced with the North Lincolnshire unitary authority.
