= Bishopthorpe Rural District =

Former local government area in the UK

Coordinates: 53.871°N 1.140°W

Bishopthorpe was a rural district in the West Riding of Yorkshire from 1894 to 1937.

It was formed under the Local Government Act 1894 from that part of the York Rural Sanitary District which was in the West Riding. It included the parishes of Acaster Malbis, Askham Richard, Bishopthorpe, Copmanthorpe, Dringhouses Without and Middlethorpe Without.

It was abolished in 1937 by a County Review Order. Part joined the county borough of York, with the rest becoming part of the Tadcaster Rural District in the West Riding.
