= Long Riston =

Village in the East Riding of Yorkshire, England

Coordinates: 53.867020°N 0.290495°W

- Village
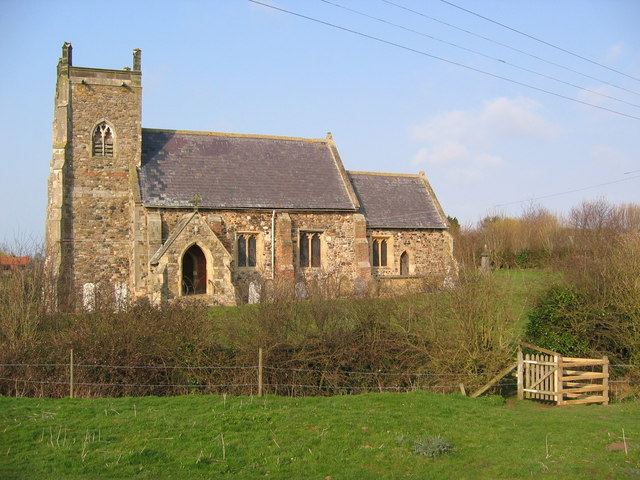
- St Margaret's Church at Long Riston

- Location within the East Riding of Yorkshire
- OS grid reference: TA125425
  - London: 160 mi (260 km) S
- Civil parish: Riston
- Unitary authority: East Riding of Yorkshire
- Ceremonial county: East Riding of Yorkshire
- Region: Yorkshire and the Humber
- Country: England
- Sovereign state: United Kingdom
- Post town: HULL
- Postcode district: HU11
- Dialling code: 01964
- Police: Humberside
- Fire: Humberside
- Ambulance: Yorkshire
- UK Parliament: Beverley and Holderness

Long Riston is a village in the civil parish of Riston, in the East Riding of Yorkshire, England, in an area known as Holderness. It is situated approximately 9 miles (14 km) north of Kingston upon Hull city centre and 6 miles (10 km) east of Beverley town centre. It lies to the east of the A165 road which by-passes the village. In 1931 the parish had a population of 266. On 1 April 1935 the parish was abolished to form Riston.

The name Riston derives from the Old English hrīstūn meaning 'settlement growing with shrubs'.

The church dedicated to St Margaret was designated a Grade II* listed building in 1966 and is now recorded in the National Heritage List for England, maintained by Historic England.

The village is a commuter settlement for those working in Hull and Beverley. The village has two public houses, The Travellers Rest and The Micro Pig.

In 1823 Long Riston was a civil parish in the Wapentake and Liberty of Holderness. Population at the time was 361. Occupations included eight farmers, two blacksmiths, three grocers, two shoemakers, two tailors, two wheelwrights, a butcher, a bricklayer, a hawker, and the landlord of The Traveller public house. Two carriers operated between the village and Hull, and Beverley, twice weekly.

In 1872 land adjacent to Main Street was given for the establishment of a school. The school was completed in March 1873. Until the late 1950s it was known as Long Riston School and served both Long Riston and the hamlet of Arnold. Subsequently, it became known as Riston C E Primary School. The school is a voluntary controlled church school in the diocese of York.

The church stands back from the road in fields at the north end of the village that show signs of medieval ridge and furrow farming and next to an area called Butt Hills where there is evidence of archery butts. Long Riston Archery Festival has been held yearly since 2013 in the Medieval archery butts next to St Margaret's church, Long Riston.

== See also ==
- Listed buildings in Riston
