= Glanford Brigg Rural District =

Former local government area in the UK

Coordinates: 53.6°N 0.5°W

Glanford Brigg
- Glanford Brigg Rural District shown within Parts of Lindsey in 1970.
- History
  - Created: 1894
  - Abolished: 1974
  - Succeeded by: Glanford
- Status: Rural district

Glanford Brigg was a rural district in Lincolnshire, Parts of Lindsey from 1894 to 1974.

It was formed under the Local Government Act 1894 from the Glanford Brigg rural sanitary district. It entirely surrounded the borough of Scunthorpe.

It was enlarged slightly as several urban districts were abolished and incorporated into it. It absorbed Broughton in 1923 and then Roxby cum Risby and Winterton in 1936 (under a County Review Order.)

In 1974 the district was abolished, being combined with Brigg Urban District and Barton upon Humber Urban District to form a new Glanford district.
