= Barton upon Humber Urban District =

Former administrative division of Lincolnshire, England

Barton upon Humber
- Barton upon Humber shown within Parts of Lindsey in 1970
- Area
  - 1911: 6,343 acres (25.67 km^{2})
  - 1961: 6,343 acres (25.67 km^{2})
- Population
  - 1911: 6,673
  - 1961: 6,582
- History
  - Created: 1894
  - Abolished: 1974
  - Succeeded by: Glanford
- Status: Urban District
- Government: Barton upon Humber Urban District Council
  - HQ: Barton-upon-Humber

Barton upon Humber was an Urban District in Parts of Lindsey, Lincolnshire, England, from 1894 to 1974. It was created under the Local Government Act 1894.

The district was abolished in 1974 under the Local Government Act 1972 and combined with the Brigg Urban District and Glanford Brigg Rural District to form the new Glanford district in Humberside. Glanford was subsequently abolished in 1996 and replaced with the North Lincolnshire unitary authority.
