= Listed buildings in Riston =

Riston is a civil parish in the county of the East Riding of Yorkshire, England. It contains five listed buildings that are recorded in the National Heritage List for England. Of these, one is listed at Grade II*, the middle of the three grades, and the others are at Grade II, the lowest grade. The parish contains the village of Long Riston, the hamlet of Arnold and the surrounding countryside. All the listed buildings are in Long Riston, and consist of a church and houses.

== Key ==
| Grade | Criteria |
|---|---|
| II* | Particularly important buildings of more than special interest |
| II | Buildings of national importance and special interest |

== Buildings ==
| Name and location | Photograph | Date | Notes | Grade |
|---|---|---|---|---|
| St Margaret's Church; 53.86861°N 0.29325°W | | 13th century | The church has been altered and extended through the centuries, including work by G. T. Andrews in 1853–55. It is built in cobble, with red brick infill, stone dressings and a Welsh slate roof. The church consists of a nave, a south porch, a chancel with a north vestry, and a west tower. The tower has two stages, diagonal buttresses, a pointed two-light west window, two-light bell openings, an eaves string course with gargoyles, and a low parapet with corner pinnacles. | II* |
| Manor House; 53.86855°N 0.29097°W | — | Early 18th century | The farmhouse, which was later extended, is in pinkish-brown brick on the ground floor and pinkish-yellow brick on the upper floor, with red brick dressings, a modillion eaves cornice, and a pantile roof with brick coping and tumbled-in brick to the gable ends. There are two storeys, four bays and a rear range. The doorway has a fanlight, the windows are sashes, and the ground floor openings are under flat gauged brick arches. | II |
| Cooper Farm; 53.86557°N 0.28950°W | — | Early 19th century | The house is in pinkish-yellow brick, with a modillion eaves band, and a pantile roof with brick coping and kneelers, and tumbled-in brick on the gable ends. There are two storeys, three bays and a rear range. In the centre is a doorway with pilasters, a fanlight, a cornice and a hood. Above the doorway is a blind opening, and the windows are sashes, those on the ground floor with cambered heads. | II |
| Burton Cottage; 53.86247°N 0.28740°W | — | Early to mid-19th century | A farmhouse, later a private house, in whitewashed pinkish-brown brick, with a modillion eaves cornice and hipped pantile roofs. There are two storeys, a main range of three bays, flanking single-story single-bay wings, and a rear range. On the front of the main range are sash windows, those on the ground floor with cambered heads, and on the wings are blind openings with cambered heads. The entrance is at the rear. | II |
| Ivy House; 53.86248°N 0.28708°W | — | Early to mid-19th century | A farmhouse, later a private house, in pinkish-brown brick, with a modillion eaves cornice and hipped pantile roofs. There are two storeys, a main range of three bays, flanking single-story single-bay wings, and a rear range. On the front of the main range are sash windows, those on the ground floor with cambered heads, and on the wings are blind openings with cambered heads. The entrance is at the rear. | II |
