= Willerby =

Willerby may refer to several places:

- Willerby, East Riding of Yorkshire, a village and civil parish located on the western outskirts of the city of Kingston upon Hull in the East Riding of Yorkshire
- Willerby, North Yorkshire, a small village and civil parish in the Ryedale district of North Yorkshire

It may also refer to:

- Willerby, one of two merchant vessels
