= Skirlaugh Rural District =

Former local government area in the UK

Coordinates: 53.852°N 0.213°W

Skirlaugh was a rural district in the East Riding of Yorkshire, England from 1894 to 1935.

The district formed an area around the Hornsea urban district.

The district was created by the Local Government Act 1894.

In 1935 the district was abolished by a County Review Order made under the Local Government Act 1929. and the area then formed part of the newly created Holderness Rural District. At the same time a small part was transferred to the municipal borough of Kingston upon Hull.
