= Sherburn Rural District =

Former local government area in the UK

Coordinates: 54.197°N 0.426°W

Sherburn was a rural district in the East Riding of Yorkshire from 1894 to 1935. It was formed under the Local Government Act 1894 from that part of the Scarborough rural sanitary district which was in the East Riding (the rest forming Scarborough Rural District in the North Riding).

It was abolished in 1935 by a County Review Order made under the Local Government Act 1929 and transferred to Norton Rural District, Bridlington Rural District and a small part to Filey Urban District.
