= York Rural Sanitary District =

Former local government area in the UK

Coordinates: 53.958°N 1.082°W

York was a rural sanitary district in Yorkshire, England, until 1894. It was based on the York poor law union (minus the City of York itself, which was an urban sanitary district), and included parishes in the West Riding, the North Riding and the East Riding, forming a ring around the city.

It was abolished in 1894 under the Local Government Act 1894, and split to form rural districts. It was succeeded by the Bishopthorpe Rural District (West Riding), the Flaxton Rural District (North Riding) and the Escrick Rural District (East Riding).
