= Derwent Rural District =

Rural district in the East Riding of Yorkshire from 1935 to 1974

Coordinates: 53.849°N 0.988°W

Derwent was a rural district in the East Riding of Yorkshire from 1935 to 1974.

It was created under a County Review Order in 1935, from most of the Escrick Rural District and the Riccal Rural District, and part of the Howden Rural District.

It was abolished in 1974 under the Local Government Act 1972, going on to form part of the district of Selby of North Yorkshire. Several parishes in the area were transferred from Selby to the City of York in 1996.
