= Riccal Rural District =

Former local government area in the UK

Coordinates: 53.837°N 1.051°W

Riccal was a rural district in the East Riding of Yorkshire, England from 1894 to 1935.

It was formed in 1894 from that part of the Selby rural sanitary district which was in the East Riding (the rest in the West Riding, going on to form Selby Rural District).

The rural district contained eight civil parishes:

- Barlby
- Cliffe cum Lund
- Kelfield
- North Duffield
- Osgodby
- Riccall
- South Duffield
- Skipwith

In 1935, under a County Review Order made under the Local Government Act 1929, it was abolished, and mostly became part of a new Derwent Rural District, with a small part going to Howden Rural District.
