= Riston =

Civil parish in the East Riding of Yorkshire, England

Coordinates: 53°52′N 0°17′W

- Civil parish
- Population: 979 (2011 census)
- OS grid reference: TA128425
- Civil parish: Riston
- Unitary authority: East Riding of Yorkshire
- Ceremonial county: East Riding of Yorkshire
- Region: Yorkshire and the Humber
- Country: England
- Sovereign state: United Kingdom
- Post town: HULL
- Postcode district: HU11
- Police: Humberside
- Fire: Humberside
- Ambulance: Yorkshire
- UK Parliament: Beverley and Holderness

Riston is a civil parish in the East Riding of Yorkshire, England. It is situated approximately 9 miles (14 km) north of Hull city centre and covering an area of 1,374.241 hectares (3,395.82 acres).

The civil parish is formed by the village of Long Riston and the hamlet of Arnold.

According to the 2011 UK census, Riston parish had a population of 979, an increase on the 2001 UK census figure of 630.

== See also ==
- Listed buildings in Riston
