= Willerby (ship) =

At least two vessels have been named Willerby:

- Willerby (1799 ship) was launched in 1799 as a West Indiaman. French privateers captured her around early 1802, but then released her. She suffered damage in a gale in 1815, but continued to trade. She sailed to New South Wales and was wrecked in early 1818.
- SS Willerby (1912 ship) was a steel screw steamer of 3,630 GRT launched at Stockton. On 20 February 1915 during World War I, the German commerce raider SMS Prinz Friedrich Eitel scuttled her in the Atlantic Ocean 490 nautical miles (910 km) north east by north of Pernambuco, Brazil.
