= Sculcoates Rural District =

Former rural district in the East Riding of Yorkshire, England

Coordinates: 53.740°N 0.489°W

Sculcoates was a rural district in the East Riding of Yorkshire, England from 1894 to 1935.

The district formed three separate areas around Kingston upon Hull municipal borough.

The district was created by the Local Government Act 1894.

In 1935 the district was abolished by a County Review Order made under the Local Government Act 1929. and the area then formed part of the newly created Holderness Rural District and the Haltemprice Urban District. At the same time parts were transferred to Beverley Rural District and the municipal boroughs of Hedon and Kingston upon Hull.
