= Escrick Rural District =

Former local government area in the UK

Coordinates: 53.906°N 0.964°W

Escrick was a rural district in the East Riding of Yorkshire from 1894 to 1935.

It was formed under the Local Government Act 1894 from the part of the York Rural Sanitary District which was in the East Riding.

It was abolished in 1935 under a County Review Order. Most of it went to form part of the new Derwent Rural District, with a small part becoming part of Pocklington Rural District.
