= Norton Rural District (Yorkshire) =

Former administrative area of Yorkshire, England

Coordinates: 54.126°N 0.668°W

Norton was a rural district in the East Riding of Yorkshire from 1894 to 1974. It was based on the small town of Norton-on-Derwent, and was formed under the Local Government Act 1894 from that part of the Malton rural sanitary district which was in the East Riding (the rest forming Malton Rural District in the North Riding).

It was expanded in 1935 by a County Review Order made under the Local Government Act 1929 by taking in parts of the rural districts of Driffield, Pocklington and Sherburn.

In 1974 the district was abolished by the Local Government Act 1972, and since then has formed part of the Ryedale district in North Yorkshire.
