= Beverley Rural District =

Former local government area in the UK

Coordinates: 53.831°N 0.536°W

Beverley was a rural district in the East Riding of Yorkshire, England from 1894 to 1974.

The district surrounded but did not include Beverley, which formed a municipal borough.

The district was created by the Local Government Act 1894. It picked up part of Cottingham Urban District and Sculcoates Rural District when they were abolished in 1935 by a County Review Order made under the Local Government Act 1929. At the same time it was enlarged by the transfer of parts of Howden Rural District and reduced as other parts of the district were transferred to Kingston upon Hull municipal borough.

In 1974 the district was abolished. Its former area was combined with the borough of Beverley and Haltemprice Urban District to form an enlarged Beverley borough in the county of Humberside. Today the area forms part of the East Riding of Yorkshire district.
