= Driffield Rural District =

Former local government area in the UK

Coordinates: 54.029°N 0.466°W

Driffield was a rural district in the East Riding of Yorkshire in England from 1894 to 1974. It surrounded the municipal borough of Driffield.

The district was created by the Local Government Act 1894. It picked up part of the Great Driffield Urban District when that was abolished in 1935 by a County Review Order made under the Local Government Act 1929. At the same time parts of the district were transferred to Driffield Urban District and Norton Rural District while gaining parts of Pocklington Rural District.

It was abolished in 1974, under the Local Government Act 1972. The district was transferred to the new district of North Wolds in Humberside.
