= Holderness (borough) =

Former local government district in England

Coordinates: 53.795°N 0.172°W

- Holderness shown within Humberside
- Area
  - 1974: 133,593 acres (540.63 km^{2})
- Population
  - 1973: 42,610
  - 1992: 51,800
- History
  - Created: 1974
  - Abolished: 1996
  - Succeeded by: East Riding of Yorkshire
- Status: Non-metropolitan district, Borough
- Government
  - HQ: Skirlaugh
  - Motto: Think Right : Do Right

Holderness was a local government district and borough in northern England, named after the Holderness peninsula.

It was formed on 1 April 1974 along with the non-metropolitan county of Humberside in which it was situated. It was formed from part of the administrative county of Yorkshire, East Riding, namely:

- The municipal borough of Hedon,
- The urban districts of Hornsea and Withernsea,
- The Holderness Rural District.

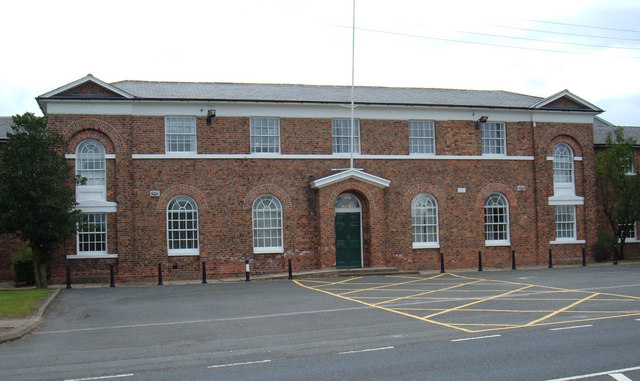
Council Offices, Skirlaugh

The council's headquarters were at Skirlaugh, in the converted workhouse that had been built in 1838.

On 1 April 1996, Humberside and the borough were abolished, and it became part of the new unitary East Riding of Yorkshire.

== See also ==
- Holderness Borough Council elections
