= Howden Rural District =

Former rural district in the East Riding of Yorkshire, England

Coordinates: 53.797°N 0.848°W

Howden Rural District was a rural district in the East Riding of Yorkshire, England, from 1894 to 1974. It was centred on Howden and administered a predominantly rural area surrounding the town.

The district was created in 1894 under the Local Government Act 1894 as the successor to the Howden rural sanitary district.

Its boundaries were altered substantially in 1935 as part of the county review carried out under the Local Government Act 1929. On 1 April that year, the civil parishes of Brackenholme with Woodhall, Hemingbrough and Menthorpe cum Bowthorpe, together with part of Barmby on the Marsh, were transferred from Howden Rural District to the newly created Derwent Rural District. The transferred area comprised 3,673 acres and had a population of 692 at the 1931 census. Parts of Hotham and North Cave with Everthorpe and Drewton, totalling 1,453 acres, were transferred to Beverley Rural District. At the same time, Howden Rural District gained a small part of South Duffield parish, amounting to 5 acres, following the abolition of Riccal Rural District.

The district covered 75,068 acres at the 1931 census. Following the 1935 boundary changes, its area had fallen to 69,947 acres by 1951.

Howden Rural District was abolished on 1 April 1974 under the Local Government Act 1972. Its area became part of the new Boothferry district in the county of Humberside.

A further local government reorganisation took effect on 1 April 1996, when Humberside and Boothferry were abolished. Howden and the other northern parishes of Boothferry were incorporated into the new unitary authority of the East Riding of Yorkshire.
