= 1990s United Kingdom local government reform =

The structure of local government in the United Kingdom underwent large changes in the 1990s. The system of two-tier local government introduced in the 1970s by the Local Government Act 1972 and the Local Government (Scotland) Act 1973 was abolished in Scotland and Wales on 1 April 1996 and replaced with single-tier authorities. In England, some areas remained two-tier but many single-tier authorities (designated as Unitary Authorities in England) were created. No changes were made to local government in Northern Ireland.

== Background ==
Prior to the 1970s, the UK had had a mixed system of local government, with some areas being covered by a county council and a more local district council, while large towns had only a single tier of authority (in England and Wales these were termed county boroughs, and in Scotland 'counties of cities'). The Acts abolished the existing county boroughs or counties of cities, and created a uniform two-tier system of government with regions or counties, and districts.

In 1986, Margaret Thatcher's government abolished the county councils of the six metropolitan counties that had been created in 1974, along with the Greater London Council, effectively creating 68 new single-tier authorities: 32 London boroughs and 36 metropolitan boroughs.

In 1990, Thatcher's government introduced the Community Charge, popularly known as the Poll Tax, a new way of funding local councils based on a fixed per-head fee. This proved very unpopular, and led to riots. Eventually, Thatcher was ousted by her own party, and the new Conservative leader and Prime Minister, John Major, pledged to abolish the Community Charge.

Legislation for the Council Tax was introduced and passed in the 1991/1992 session. Also at this time the government took the opportunity to review the structure of local government throughout Great Britain.

== England ==
The Local Government Act 1992 was concerned with the implementation of the "Citizen's Charter" government initiative, the operation of compulsory competitive tendering and the structure of local government. The act established the Local Government Commission for England, allowing the Secretary of State to order the commission to undertake "structural reviews" in specified areas, to create unitary authorities in the two-tier shire counties. After much political debate, the commission's proposals resulted in:

- The abolition of the counties of Avon, Cleveland, Hereford and Worcester and Humberside, created in 1974
- The replacement of the county council of Berkshire with six unitary authorities
- New unitary authorities covering many of the larger urban districts of England.

== Scotland ==
The previous system in Scotland had been the regions and districts. These were quite unbalanced in terms of population – the Strathclyde region had nineteen districts and over two million people, whereas the Borders region had four districts and only 100,000 people.

The act established 29 new 'council areas', and retained the three island councils. Variance in population was much less in the council areas, with just over half a million in the largest council area, Glasgow City, compared to 50,000 in the smallest on the mainland, Clackmannanshire. These are however outliers, and only six are outside the range 75,000 to 250,000.

In some cases the names of traditional counties were revived as administrative areas, although often with vastly different borders.

== Wales ==
In Wales the existing system was replaced with a new single-tier system, of counties and county boroughs, the only difference between them now being the name (and the councils of Cardiff, Swansea and Newport are styled as cities).

The 1974 reform in Wales had abandoned use of the names of the historic counties of Wales as local government areas. This was partially reversed in 1996, with Anglesey, Carmarthenshire, Cardiganshire, Denbighshire, Flintshire, Monmouthshire and Pembrokeshire all reappearing as local government areas, although not necessarily with their traditional borders.

The names and areas of the administrative counties abolished in 1996 remained in use (with modifications) as the preserved counties of Wales for purposes such as Lieutenancy.
