= Borough of Scunthorpe =

Former district in Humberside, England

Scunthorpe
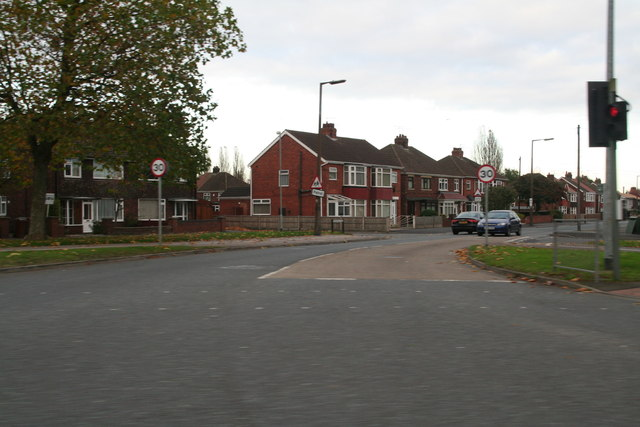

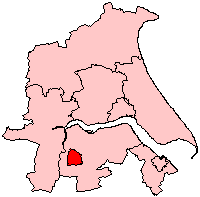
- Area
  - 1911: 1,032 acres (4.18 km^{2})
  - 1961: 7,895 acres (31.95 km^{2})
- Population
  - 1911: 10,170
  - 1961: 67,324
- History
  - Created: 1894
  - Abolished: 1996
  - Succeeded by: North Lincolnshire
- Status: Urban district: 1894–1919 municipal borough: 1919–1974 non-metropolitan district: 1974–1996
- Government: Scunthorpe Borough Council
  - HQ: Scunthorpe

Municipal Borough of Scunthorpe shown within Parts of Lindsey in 1970

Scunthorpe was a non-metropolitan district of Humberside from 1974 to 1996, urban district from 1894 to 1919 and a municipal borough from 1936 to 1974 in the Parts of Lindsey, Lincolnshire, England.

It was created as an urban district in 1894 under the Local Government Act 1894, then in 1919 it became Scunthorpe and Frodingham urban district and subsequently elevated to the status of municipal borough in 1936, at which point it was enlarged by gaining parts of the civil parishes of Crosby, Frodingham, Brumby and Ashby.

The municipal borough was abolished in 1974 under the Local Government Act 1972 and replaced by the post-1974 Scunthorpe borough in the county of Humberside. The post-1974 Scunthorpe borough was subsequently abolished in 1996 and replaced with the North Lincolnshire unitary authority.

== See also ==
- Scunthorpe Borough Council elections
