= Bridlington Rural District =

Former local government area in the UK

Coordinates: 54.088°N 0.273°W

Bridlington was a rural district in the East Riding of Yorkshire in England from 1894 to 1974. It covered a coastal area, and surrounded the municipal borough of Bridlington on its land borders. The district covered Flamborough and Flamborough Head.

The district was created by the Local Government Act 1894. It picked up part of the Sherburn Rural District when that was abolished in 1935 by a County Review Order made under the Local Government Act 1929. At the same time parts of the district were transferred to Bridlington and Filey urban districts.

It was abolished in 1974, under the Local Government Act 1972. The district was split between the new districts of North Wolds in Humberside and Scarborough in North Yorkshire.
