= East Yorkshire Borough of Beverley =

UK local government district (1974–1996)

Coordinates: 53.794°N 0.416°W

- Beverley shown within Humberside
- Area
  - 1974: 100,020 acres (404.8 km^{2})
- Population
  - 1973: 106,800
  - 1992: 113,600
- History
  - Created: 1974
  - Abolished: 1996
  - Succeeded by: East Riding of Yorkshire
- Status: non-metropolitan district, Borough
- Government
  - HQ: Beverley
  - Motto: Haulte Emprise (High Endeavour)

The East Yorkshire Borough of Beverley was a local government district and borough of Humberside, England, from 1974 to 1996.

It was formed on 1 April 1974, by the merger of the previous borough of Beverley, with Beverley Rural District and Haltemprice Urban District. Initially named Beverley, the name was formally changed by the council to East Yorkshire Borough of Beverley in 1981.

On 1 April 1996, Humberside was abolished along with the borough, and the area become part of a unitary East Riding of Yorkshire.

The council offices were at Admiral Walker House, Lairgate, Beverley, and Anlaby House in Anlaby.

The leader of the council from 1976 to 1991 was Conservative councillor Claude Sonley (1913–2003), who had represented Great Britain at shooting at the 1936 Olympics in Berlin.

== See also ==
- East Yorkshire Borough of Beverley Council elections
