= Holderness Wapentake =

Former English administrative division

Coordinates: 53.848°N 0.201°W

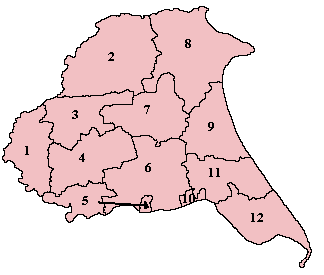
Wapentakes of the East Riding of Yorkshire. North Division is marked 9, Middle Division is marked 11 and South Division is marked 12.

Holderness was a wapentake of the historic East Riding of Yorkshire, England consisting of the south-easterly part of the county. Established in medieval times, it ceased to have much significance in the 19th century when the wapentakes were superseded by other administrative divisions for most local government purposes.

Because of its large area it was sub-divided into three divisions—North Division, Middle Division and South Division.
