= Pocklington Rural District =

Former local government area in the UK

Coordinates: 53.922°N 0.734°W

Pocklington was a rural district in the East Riding of Yorkshire, England from 1894 to 1974.

The district surrounded but did not originally include Pocklington, which formed a separate urban district.

The district was created by the Local Government Act 1894. It picked up all of Pocklington Urban District and a small part of Escrick Rural District when they were abolished in 1935 by a County Review Order made under the Local Government Act 1929. At the same time it was reduced as parts of the district were transferred to Driffield and Norton rural districts.

In 1974 the district was abolished. Its area formed part of the East Yorkshire district in the county of Humberside. Today the area forms part of the East Riding of Yorkshire district.
