= Holderness Rural District =

Former local government area in the UK

Coordinates: 53.778°N 0.123°W

Holderness was a rural district in the East Riding of Yorkshire from 1935 to 1974. It covered the southern part of the East Riding's North Sea coast.

It was created by a County Review Order made under the Local Government Act 1929 by the merger of Patrington Rural District, most of Skirlaugh Rural District and part of Sculcoates Rural District.

It survived until 1974, when, under the Local Government Act 1972 it was abolished, and became part of the larger Holderness borough in Humberside. Since 1996 it has formed part of a unitary East Riding.
