= Haltemprice =

Area of the East Riding of Yorkshire, England

Coordinates: 53.764°N 0.439°W

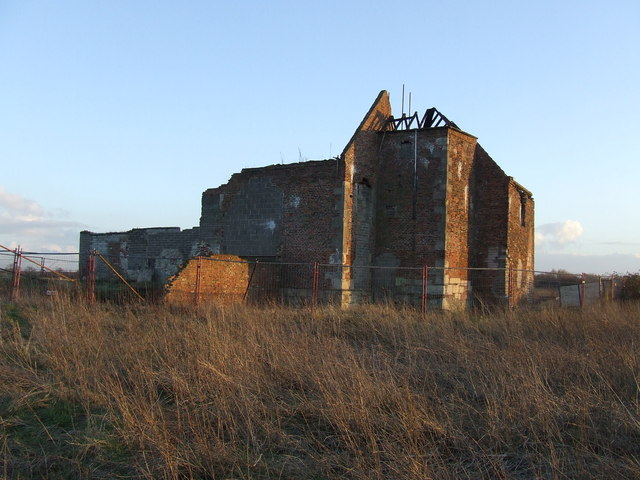
- Haltemprice Priory Farmhouse

- Location within the East Riding of Yorkshire
- Unitary authority: East Riding of Yorkshire
- Ceremonial county: East Riding of Yorkshire
- Region: Yorkshire and the Humber
- Country: England
- Sovereign state: United Kingdom

Obsolete Arms of the Former Haltemprice Urban District Council

Haltemprice is an area in the East Riding of Yorkshire, England, directly to the west of Kingston upon Hull. Originally an extra-parochial area, it became a civil parish in 1858, in 1935 it was expanded by the combination of the urban districts of Cottingham and Anlaby and rural district of Sculcoates to form a new urban district; the district included the villages of Anlaby, Cottingham, Hessle, Kirk Ella, Skidby, West Ella and Willerby. Urban districts were abolished 1974.

Haltemprice gave its name to the Haltemprice and Howden UK Parliament constituency between 1997 and 2024. Following boundary changes, the name continues in the part of the new constituency Kingston upon Hull West and Haltemprice, which replaced the 1997-2024 constituency of Kingston upon Hull West and Hessle by adding the wards of Anlaby, Kirk Ella, West Ella and Willerby to the West Hull wards and Hessle in East Riding.

The East Riding of Yorkshire Council run 'Haltemprice Leisure Centre' in Anlaby retains the name.

== Background and etymology ==
Haltemprice Priory was established as an Augustinian religious dwelling in the 14th century. The name is thought to derive from the French Haute Emprise (High enterprise). The priory existed until the 16th century and the Dissolution of the Monasteries under Henry VIII. Settlement continued at Haltemprice as 'Haltemprice Farm', the farm was occupied up to 1998; as of 2011 the farm building was derelict.

== Parish (1858–1974) ==
Haltemprice was historically an extra-parochial area, and was made a civil parish in its own right in 1858. It was included in the Sculcoates Rural District under the Local Government Act 1894.

== Urban district (1935–1974) ==
On 1 April 1935, under a County Review Order, an urban district of Haltemprice was set up, to cover Hull's western suburbs. The Cottingham and Hessle urban districts were abolished and included into the new Haltemprice Urban District, as was part of the Sculcoates Rural District including the existing parish of Haltemprice and the parish of West Ella. In 1961 the parish had a population of 42,386.

On 1 April 1974, under the Local Government Act 1972, Haltemprice Urban District was merged to form part of the Beverley borough in Humberside. Haltemprice parish was also abolished. The northern half of Humberside became the reconstituted East Riding in 1996. The former Haltemprice area has been since divided again into a number of civil parishes.
