= East Yorkshire (district) =

Former local government district in England

Coordinates: 54.029°N 0.466°W

North Wolds East Yorkshire
- East Yorkshire district shown within Humberside
- Area
  - 1974: 258,019 acres (1,044.17 km^{2})
- Population
  - 1973: 67,920
  - 1992: 86,700
- History
  - Created: 1974
  - Abolished: 1996
  - Succeeded by: East Riding of Yorkshire
- Status: Borough
  - HQ: Pocklington

The Borough of East Yorkshire was one of nine local government districts of the county of Humberside, England from 1 April 1974 to 1 April 1996.

The district was created as North Wolds, but was renamed by resolution of the council on 1 February 1981 (the Borough of Beverley was renamed to include 'East Yorkshire' in its name the same year, leading to the borough's councillors accusing North Wolds councillors of "usurping" the name). North Wolds council had made an earlier attempt in 1973, a year before it formally came into existence, to be named "Bridlington and Yorkshire Wolds", however this was struck down by the Department of the Environment.

The district was formed under the Local Government Act 1972 by the amalgamation of a number of areas formerly in the administrative county of Yorkshire, East Riding: namely the municipal borough of Bridlington, Driffield urban district, Driffield Rural District, Pocklington Rural District and most of Bridlington Rural District.

The district was abolished in 1996, and merged into the new East Riding of Yorkshire local government district, which covers a much larger area.

== See also ==
- East Yorkshire District Council elections
