= Humberside =

Former county of England

Coordinates: 53.8°N 0.5°W

- 1974–1996
- Flag Coat of arms

- Humberside within England in 1974
- Area
  - 1974: 867,755 acres (3,511.68 km^{2})
- Population
  - 1973: 847,230
  - 1981: 843,280
  - 1991: 858,040
- History
  - Origin: Humber Estuary and environs
  - Created: 1974
  - Abolished: 1996
  - Succeeded by: East Riding of Yorkshire; Hull; North Lincolnshire; North East Lincolnshire
- Status: Non-metropolitan county
- ONS code: 27
- Government: Humberside County Council
  - HQ: Beverley
  - Motto: United we Flourish
- Coat of arms of the county council
- History
  - Established: 1974
  - Disestablished: 1996

Humberside (/ˈhʌmbərsaɪd/) was a non-metropolitan and ceremonial county in Northern England from 1 April 1974 until 1 April 1996. It was composed of land from either side of the Humber, created from portions of the East Riding of Yorkshire, West Riding of Yorkshire, and the northern part of Lindsey, Lincolnshire. The county council's headquarters was County Hall at Beverley, inherited from East Riding County Council. Its largest settlement and only city was Kingston upon Hull. Other notable towns included Goole, Beverley, Scunthorpe, Grimsby, Cleethorpes and Bridlington. The county stretched from Wold Newton at its northern tip to a different Wold Newton at its southernmost point.

Humberside bordered North Yorkshire to the north and west, South Yorkshire and Nottinghamshire to the south-west, and Lincolnshire to the south. It faced east towards the North Sea.

On 1 April 1996, Humberside was abolished, and replaced with four unitary authority areas: North Lincolnshire, North East Lincolnshire, Kingston upon Hull, and East Riding of Yorkshire. The name has continued in use as a geographical term, mainly in the media, and in the names of institutions such as Humberside Police and Humberside Fire and Rescue Service. These institutions did not change their names mainly due to costs. There were proposals to merge the police force with other Yorkshire forces and then change all the forces' names accordingly. However, these proposals were later ruled out.

Humber Enterprise Zone was launched in 2012 to encourage industrial development at 16 sites around the estuary.

== Name ==
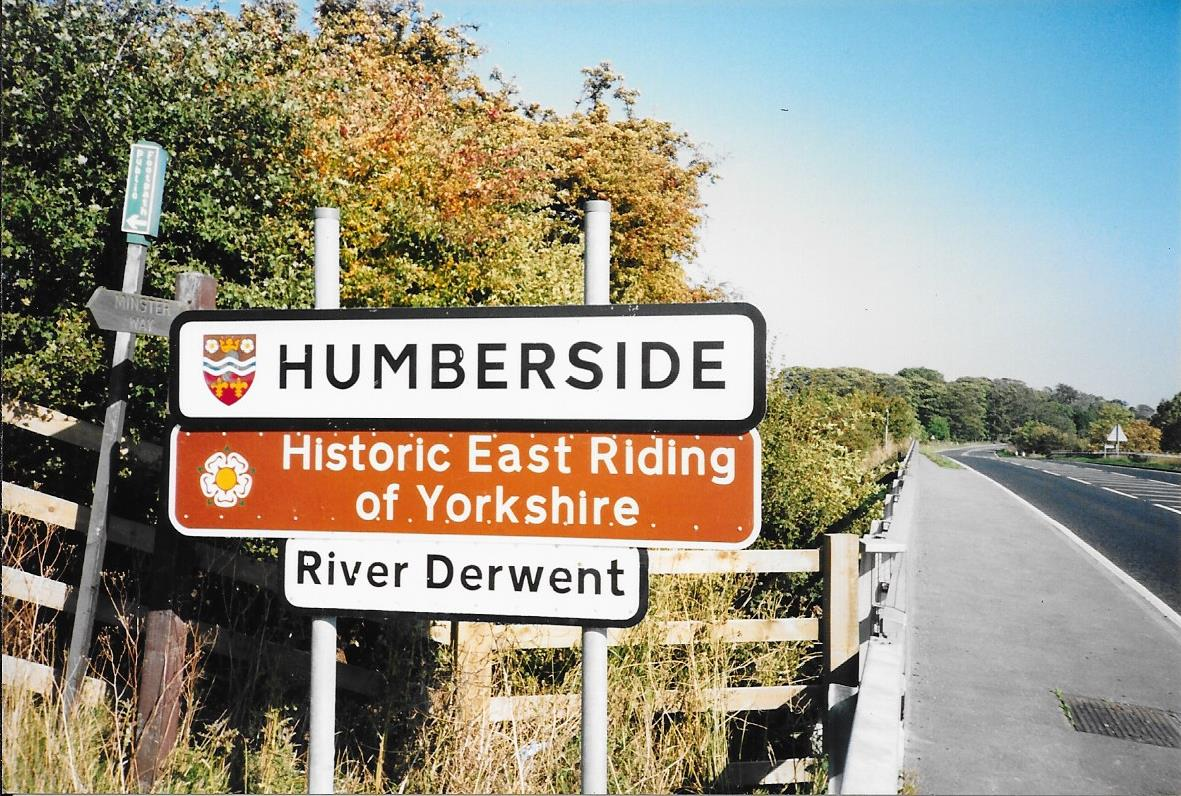
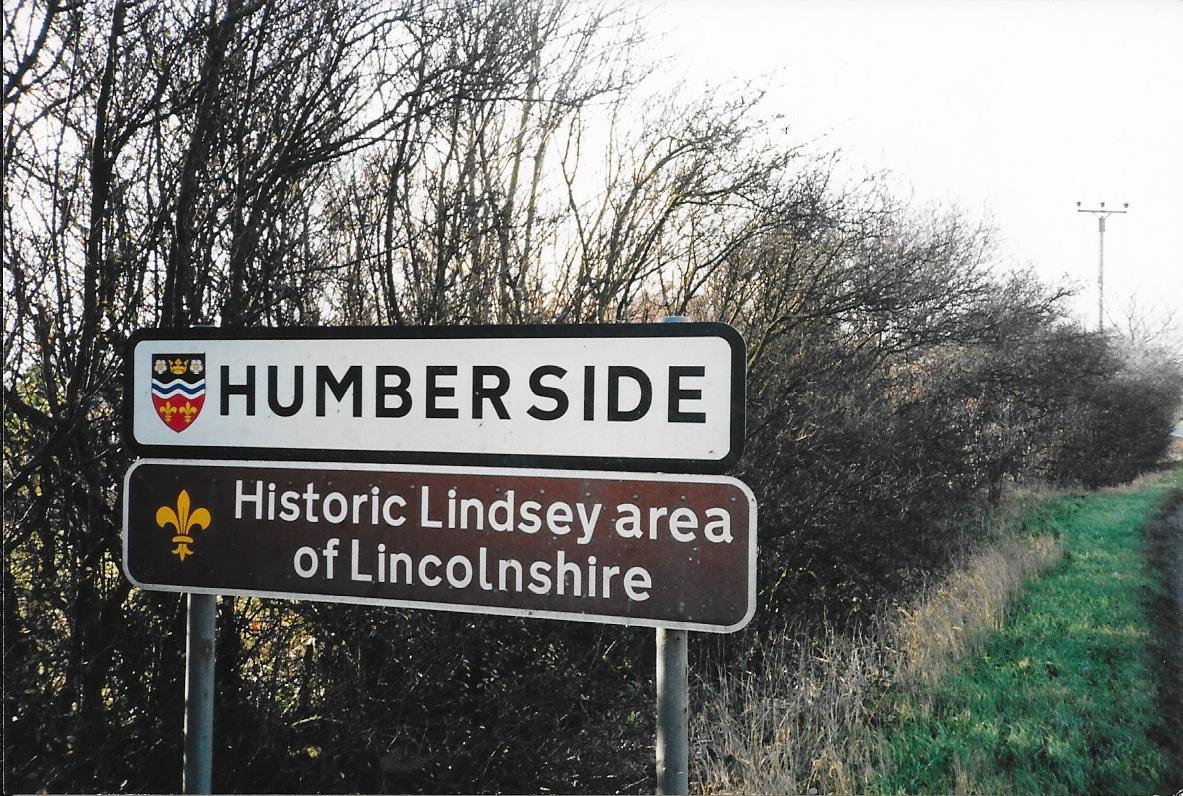
Humberside boundary signs on the A1079 within the East Riding of Yorkshire and on the A1084 within the Parts of Lindsey

The name "Humberside" was very rarely used, as an informal name and a geographical term, for the area surrounding the Humber before the creation of the ceremonial county. However, by the mid-20th century the industrial development of both sides of the Humber Estuary was becoming increasingly integrated, and "Humberside" was being widely applied to the ports of Hull, Grimsby and Goole and their hinterland. The use of the term to unify the two sides of the river was also driven by the desire of the local authorities in the area to promote the construction of a suspension bridge.

Unlike "Merseyside", which was used colloquially, "Humberside" was adopted as an official term in 1964, when the planning region of Yorkshire and The Humber was created. It consisted of the majority of the former East Riding of Yorkshire and some eastern parts of the former West Riding of Yorkshire and Parts of Lindsey from Lincolnshire. From that time onwards "Humberside" was actively used to market the area. In 1971 the newly launched local BBC radio station was named Radio Humberside, but since the abolition of the county the broadcasters have referred to people of East Yorkshire and North Lincolnshire.

== Formation ==
The county was created under the Local Government Act 1972 on 1 April 1974. It covered the former county boroughs of Grimsby and Kingston upon Hull. From Lindsey it incorporated the boroughs of Cleethorpes and Scunthorpe, the urban districts of Barton-upon-Humber and Brigg, and the rural districts of Glanford Brigg, Grimsby and the Isle of Axholme. From the East Riding it took the boroughs of Beverley, Bridlington and Hedon, the urban districts of Driffield, Haltemprice, Hornsea and Withernsea, and the rural districts of Beverley, Bridlington (part), Driffield, Holderness, Howden and Pocklington. From the West Riding it took both the borough of Goole and the rural district of Goole.

The Redcliffe-Maud Report that preceded the Local Government Act 1972 had not proposed any directly analogous area. Instead it proposed making the part north of the Humber one unitary authority, and the part south of it another. The White Paper that followed the Report did not include a cross-Humber authority either, having named the northern part "East Yorkshire" and kept the southern area in Lincolnshire. Humberside had emerged in the Local Government Bill as introduced to Parliament, which also gave it its name for the first time.

Paul Bryan, the MP for Howden, moved an amendment to the Bill that would have created a county of East Yorkshire, covering the rural area of northern Humberside along with Selby and York (and also Flaxton Rural District), leaving a Humberside including Haltemprice, Hull, Grimsby, Scunthorpe and Goole, while Cleethorpes and Grimsby Rural District would have been kept in Lincolnshire. The amendment was rejected by the House.

At this time there was very little connecting its two parts, aside from ferries and a circuitous journey via Goole (a road journey from Grimsby to Beverley, the headquarters, being something just under 100 miles). It was promised by the government that the Humber Bridge would make it a more viable unit. However, after Humberside came into existence, the bridge wasn't even built yet. By 1975 the bridge was planned to open in 1977. The bridge was finally opened on 24 June 1981, providing a permanent link between North and South, and cutting the journey from Grimsby to Beverley to a mere 30 or so miles, but, it did not secure Humberside's future.

== Governance ==
Humberside was a non-metropolitan county governed by Humberside County Council and 9 non-metropolitan district councils. Elections to the county council took place every four years, with the first election taking place in 1973 and the final elections taking place in 1993.

== Districts ==
The county was divided into nine non-metropolitan districts:

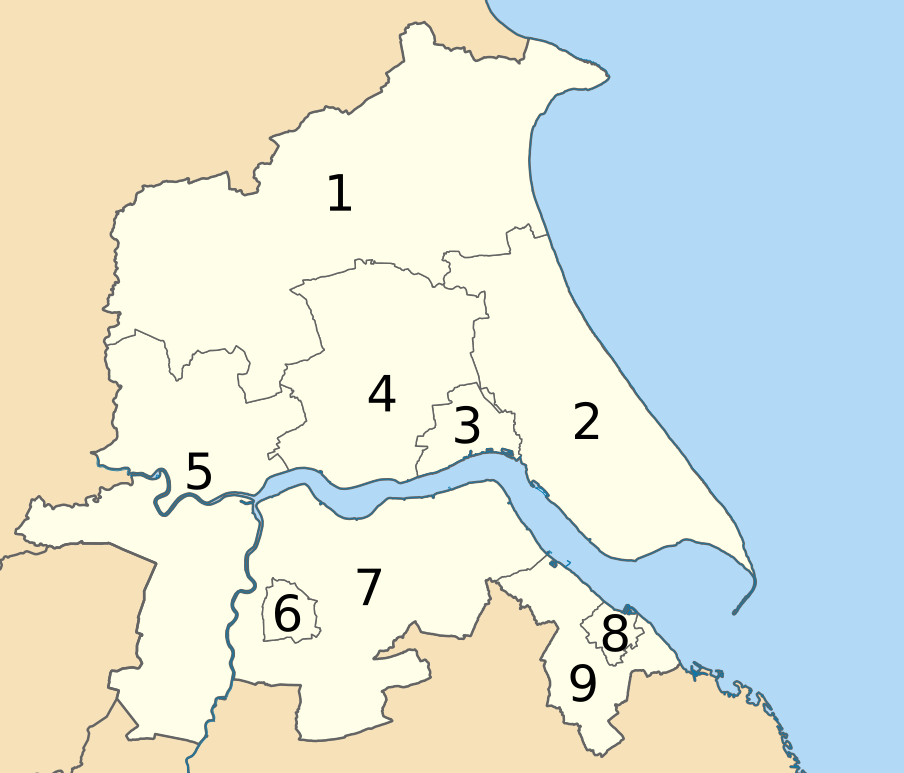

1. North Wolds, renamed East Yorkshire in 1981
2. Holderness
3. Kingston upon Hull
4. Beverley, renamed East Yorkshire Borough of Beverley in 1981
5. Boothferry
6. Scunthorpe
7. Glanford
8. Grimsby, renamed Great Grimsby in 1979
9. Cleethorpes

== Coat of arms ==
Humberside County Council held a competition to design a coat of arms for the new county. The winning design was by a Mr E. H. Cook from Thorngumbald. Letters patent granting the arms were issued by the College of Arms on 28 July 1976.

The shield formed an heraldic map of the county. At the top was a gold ducal coronet from the arms of the city of Hull between two white Yorkshire roses, while at the bottom of the shield were two gold fleurs-de-lis representing Lincolnshire. Across the centre of the shield was a blue and silver wave for the River Humber.

The crest was a blue eagle, taken from the arms of the former East Riding County Council, rising phoenix-like from flames, suggesting a new authority emerging from the ashes of the old. The eagle's wings bore gold droplets standing for North Sea oil and held in its beak a sword representing the Scunthorpe steel industry.

The supporters on either side were a silver dolphin bearing a terrestrial globe and supporting an anchor, representing worldwide trade; and Ceres, goddess of harvests, for the county's agriculture. They stood upon a compartment depicting the countryside and coastline of Humberside.

The blazon (technical description) of the arms is:
Per fess Sable and Gules on a Fess wavy Argent between in chief a Coronet Or between two Roses Argent barbed and seeded proper and in base two Fleurs de Lis Or a Bar wavy Azure and for a Crest on a Wreath Or and Gules rising from Flames proper a demi-Eagle Azure Goutté d'Or armed also Gold holding in the beak a Sword point downwards proper hilt and pommel Or.
And for Supporters on the dexter a Dolphin Argent finned Or charged on the shoulder with a Terrestrial Globe Azure the land masses Or supporting an Anchor proper and on the sinister a Female Figure habited representing Ceres with Cornucopia all proper upon a Compartment per pale Water barry wavy Azure and Argent and a Grassy Field proper.

The motto was United We Flourish.

On the abolition of the county council in 1996 the arms became obsolete. However, the Humberside Fire and Rescue Service continues to use a version of the shield as its badge.

== Abolition ==
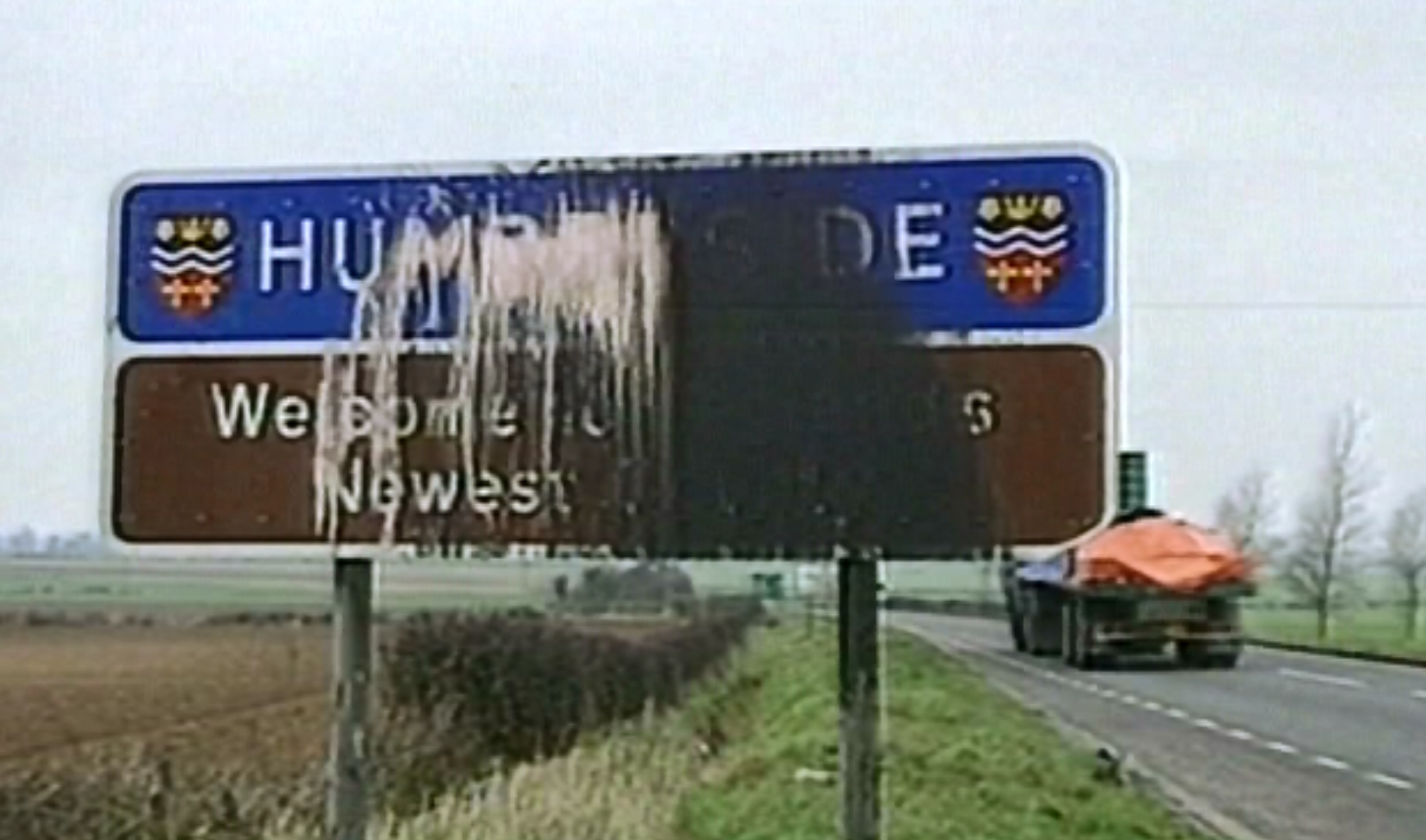
A defaced Humberside boundary sign in 1992

Humberside was not well-loved: to quote James Cran, MP for Beverley, "almost the day after the decision was announced a campaign began to have Humberside abolished". North Wolds Borough Council changed its name to East Yorkshire Borough Council and Beverley Borough Council formally included "East Yorkshire" in its name. According to Cran, there was a campaign in 1987 to get Humberside County Council to change its name to something like "East Yorkshire and North Lincolnshire". The county's boundary signs, particularly in the East Riding of Yorkshire, continually suffered vandalism, to the extent that Humberside County Council had boundary signs reading "Welcome to England's Newest County" removed in 1990 to deter vandals and save costs on producing replacement signs.

This attitude was reported as less common in the port towns of the county. For example, The Times noted in 1974 that Hull and Grimsby "regard the advantages of unification as an exciting prospect".

In 1982 the Local Government Boundary Commission for England advised the Secretary of State for the Environment, Michael Heseltine, that "a review of the Humberside county boundary [was] warranted". The Local Government Boundary Commission reviewed the existence of Humberside from 1985 to 1988, but found that "Humberside County Council could not be shown to have failed". In 1989 the Secretary of State for the Environment called for a further review, which resulted in a proposal made in November 1990 to transfer the four districts south of the Humber to the non-metropolitan county of Lincolnshire, which would have left the remaining part north of the Humber free to change its name to include "Yorkshire". A report prepared for the Commission in 1990 indicated that 63 per cent of respondents thought that the creation of Humberside was "bad" and only 14 per cent thought that it was "good".

However, before the proposal could be implemented, a general local government review for England was announced. This was conducted with an eye to creating unitary authorities, and Humberside was one of the areas that the commission was expecting "early wins" in, and was in the first tranche of reviews. The Commission recommended that the county and its districts be abolished and replaced with four unitary authorities, a proposal that the government accepted. The Order for abolition and replacement was debated in the House of Commons on 28 February 1995 and in the House of Lords on 6 March 1995, and it came into effect on 1 April 1996.

There were questions raised as to whether the boundaries of Hull should be expanded, given that they had been set many decades before and never altered despite continuous urbanisation in the neighbouring area, the former urban district of Haltemprice.

Michael Brown, the Conservative MP for Brigg and Cleethorpes, was particularly vociferous in support of the Order, saying in the debate regarding abolition: "I want to see the word 'Humberside' expunged from the English language".

Few voices were heard in defence of Humberside. Elliot Morley, Labour MP for Glanford and Scunthorpe, claimed that "young people who were born in Humberside and have an affinity with Humberside identify with it," but he agreed that the council was a "flawed idea".

The abolition of the county thus resulted in four successor unitary authorities:

- Kingston upon Hull
- East Riding of Yorkshire: Beverley, East Yorkshire, Holderness, and northern Boothferry
- North Lincolnshire: Glanford, Scunthorpe and southern Boothferry
- North East Lincolnshire: Great Grimsby, Cleethorpes

There was some debate as to the fate of Goole and the surrounding area, historically part of the West Riding. The Secretary of State, John Gummer, initially proposed that Goole should be "incorporated in Selby of North Yorkshire", but it was decided to associate it with the rest of North Humberside.

The offices of Lord Lieutenant of Humberside and High Sheriff of Humberside were also abolished. The Yorkshire part became the ceremonial county of the East Riding of Yorkshire, which includes Hull, while the Lincolnshire part reverted to Lincolnshire for ceremonial purposes. The whole of the area once covered by the former non-metropolitan county of Humberside, including the Lincolnshire parts, is part of the government office region of Yorkshire and the Humber (originally Yorkshire and Humberside).

== Postal counties ==
The Royal Mail did not adopt Humberside as a postal county, instead dividing the area into North Humberside and South Humberside for purposes of directing mail with effect from 1 July 1975. Under the Royal Mail's flexible addressing policy, in force since 1996, users may add a county – not necessarily the (former) Postal County – to an address as long as the post town and postcode are included, but it is not required to include one. The policy allows for the use of either the "former postal", "traditional" or "administrative" county. The Postcode Address File Code of Practice does not allow for changes in the former postal county. In 2008 the Postal Services Commission (Postcomm) announced that it was holding a public consultation into the code. Accordingly, local council leaders and members of parliament asked that Postcomm recommend the deletion of North and South Humberside from postal databases. The recommendations were expected to be issued in late summer 2009 and a decision made by the end of the year. in August 2013 local MP Graham Stuart brought the issue back to the fore when joint submissions and pleas from other MPs and councillors across the area for the term 'Humberside' to be dropped were made to PostComm. Graham Stuart stating "We are proud to live in the East Riding of Yorkshire, not Humberside.

The campaign was stepped up on 22 November 2013 after MP Graham Stuart stated that the head of the newly privatised Royal Mail had refused to meet him to discuss the matter. A new sticker campaign was launched which encouraged people to return any mail which was incorrectly addressed.

On 2 October 2014 the Royal Mail agreed to remove Humberside from its databases following residents continued protests taken up by Graham Stuart. Royal Mail's CEO Moya Greene stated "Royal Mail can confirm the technical change required to suppress the automatic reference to North and South Humberside as a Former Postal County on postcode address file products supplied to customers was implemented from July as part of a pilot scheme. "This now means no former postal county details will be shown for all postcodes previously tagged with a Humberside reference.

Finally more than 18 years after the county was abolished 'Humberside' as a postal destination ceased to exist.

== Legacy ==
Despite the county's abolishment, the term "Humberside" has not fallen out of use as a geographic designation within some organisations. On 2 October 2014, following the Royal Mail's decision to remove Humberside from its address database, the BBC came under public pressure to remove the name from its website and its local radio station. Both the police and the fire service stated that the reason for not pursuing a name change was cost in the present economic environment. There is still a Humberside Police (and a Humberside Police and Crime Commissioner), a Humberside Airport (roughly halfway between Scunthorpe and Grimsby), a Humberside Fire Service, Humberside Scouts and BBC Radio Humberside (founded in 1971).

=== Hull and Humber Ports city region ===
The former Humberside county was also the basis for the Hull and Humber Ports City Region, an area whose economic development is supported by the Humber Economic Partnership (HEP), a sub-regional economic development partnership. This sub-region comprises the four districts of the former county of Humberside. The City Region has a population of 887,500, of whom 380,000 work in 30,000 businesses. It is one of eight city regions defined in the 2004 document Moving Forward: The Northern Way, a collaboration between the three northern Regional Development Agencies which is a part of the 20 year government strategy to grow the economy of Northern England. The Hull and Humber Ports City Region Development Plan vision for the City region is of a global gateway with a thriving, outward-looking sustainable economy building on its unique assets of location, the estuary, ports connectivity, and physical environment.

==== Enterprise zone ====
Humber Enterprise Zone, an enterprise zone initiated by Humber Local Enterprise Partnership, was announced by the government in 2011, and launched in April 2012. It contains 16 sites around the Humber Estuary, with a total area of 484 hectares (1,200 acres). The zone has a focus on marine engineering and offshore, renewable energy, and was designed in two tiers. Four of the sites offer enhanced capital allowances, aimed at large manufacturers. These sites are Green Port Hull, Queen Elizabeth Dock, Paull and Able Marine Energy Park. The remaining sites offer reduced business rates aimed at businesses in the supply chain of the larger manufacturers. These include the Port of Grimsby.

== See also ==
- Avon (county)
- Cleveland (county)
- Viken (county), a former Norwegian county with a similar history
