= Beverley Guildhall =

Municipal building in Beverley, East Riding of Yorkshire, England

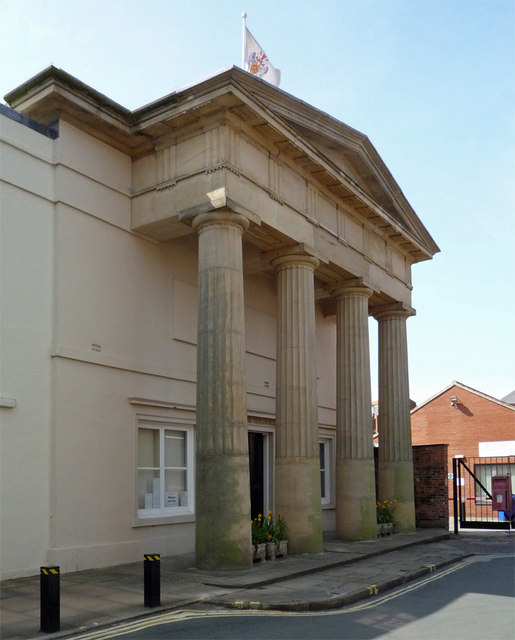

- Location within East Riding of Yorkshire
- 53.8412°N 0.4301°W
- Location: Beverley, East Riding of Yorkshire

History
- Built: 1320

Listed Building – Grade I
- Designated: 1 March 1950
- Reference no.: 1083960

The Guildhall is a municipal facility at Register Square in Beverley, East Riding of Yorkshire, England. It is a Grade I listed building.

== History ==
The building, which dates back to 1320, was acquired from a householder, Edward Mynskyp, for use as a meeting place by the town officials in 1501. It was remodelled internally by William Middleton in 1762. It was remodelled again, both internally and externally in 1832, when the original arched entrance was removed and a large portico with four Doric order columns and a pediment above, designed by Charles Mountain the Younger, was installed on the front of the building.

The courtroom, located on the ground floor on the south side of the building, features a Rococo-style stucco ceiling, created by the stuccoist, Giuseppe Cortese (1704-1779), which was installed at the time of the remodelling by Middleton. The courtroom was used as the sole facility for dispensing justice in the town until the Sessions House at New Walk opened in 1814. At that time the quarter sessions moved to the new Sessions House, but the magistrates' courts continued to be held in the guildhall. In 1827, a public gallery was created in the courtroom using two Doric order columns which had been designed by Nicholas Hawksmoor for the galleries of Beverley Minster and which had been removed from the minister the previous year.

Also created by Middleton, as part of the remodelling, was the magistrates room, located on the first floor on the north side of the building: this functioned as the council chamber for the Borough of Beverley until 1832 when the mayor's parlour was created. The mayor's parlour, located on the first floor at the front of the building, was used as a council chamber for the Borough of Beverley from 1832 until council meetings moved to the courtroom in 1896. Although council offices were established at Lairgate in 1911, council meetings including the annual mayor choosing ceremony continued to be held at the guildhall. In the late 19th century, along with the Sessions House, the guildhall was also used as the meeting place for the East Riding County Council until County Hall was completed in 1891. The guildhall also ceased to be the local seat of government for the town when the new unitary authority, the East Riding of Yorkshire Council, was formed in 1996.

The guildhall now operates as a community museum which exhibits objects from Beverley's history. Works of art in the guildhall include paintings by Fred Elwell and his wife, Mary Elwell, and a collection of 15th century minstrels' chains. Staff at the guildhall also arrange local interest exhibitions.

== See also ==
- Grade I listed buildings in the East Riding of Yorkshire
- Listed buildings in Beverley (south area)

== Gallery ==
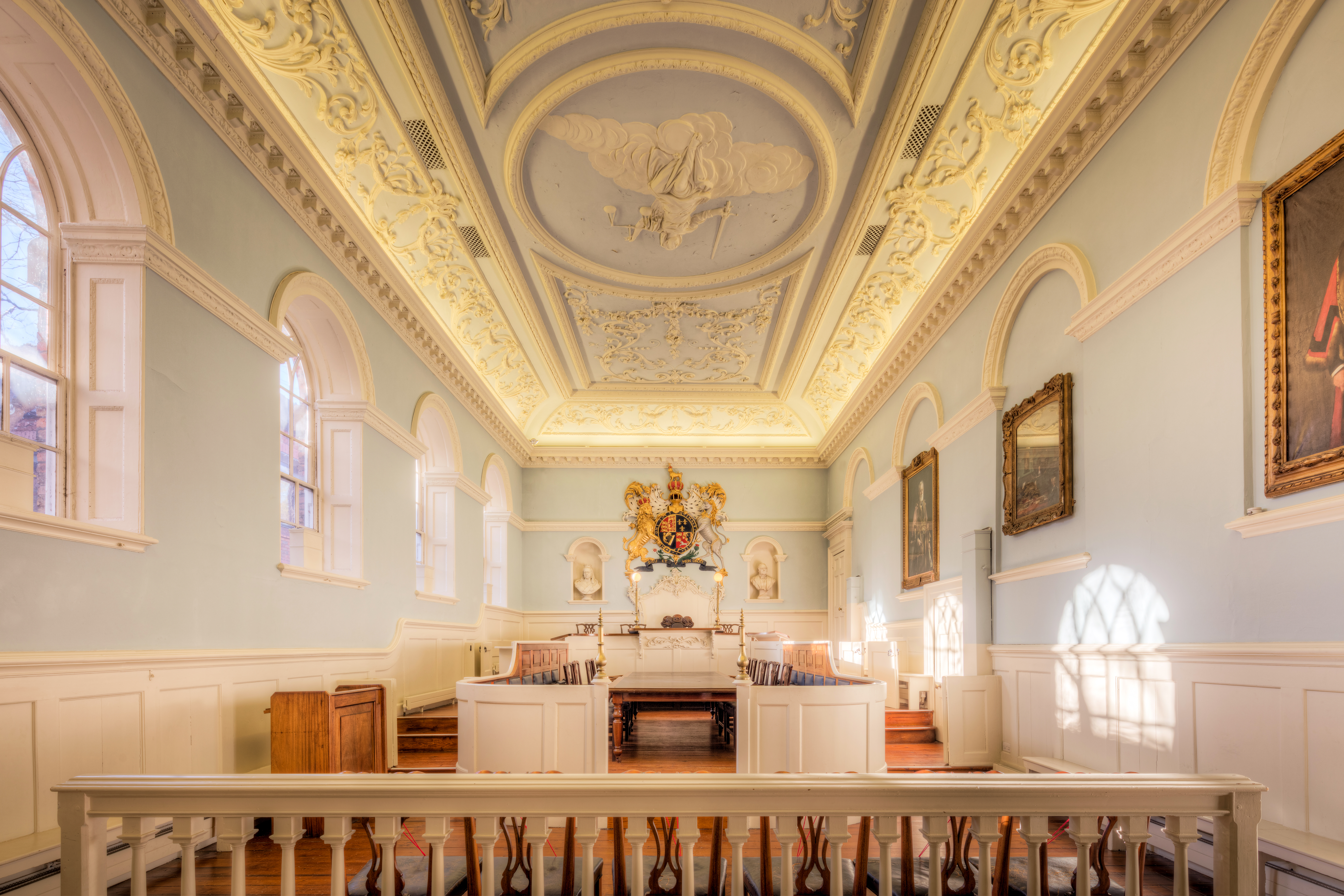
The courtroom

The magistrates' room

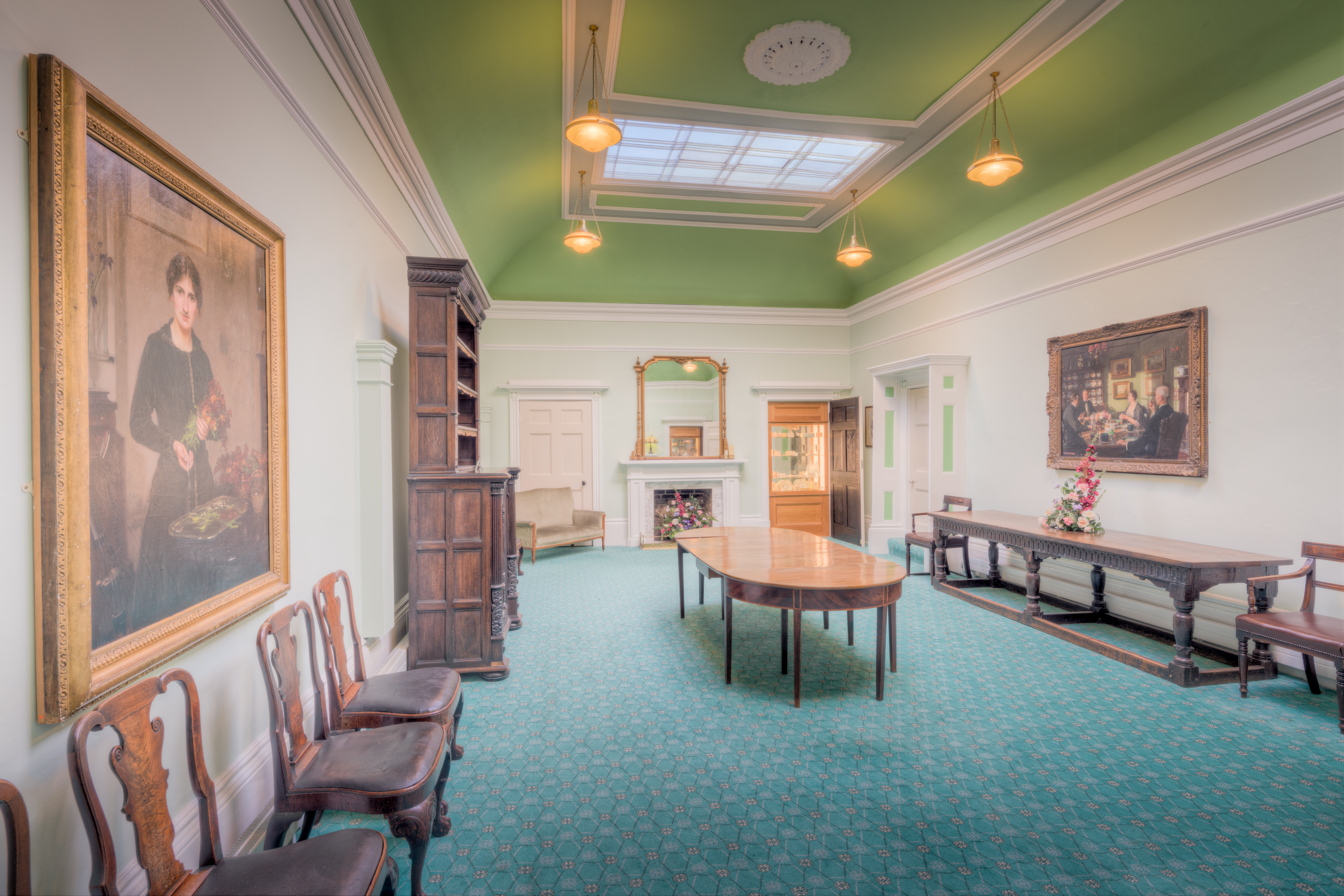
The Mayor's Parlour
