= Sessions House, Beverley =

Sessions House
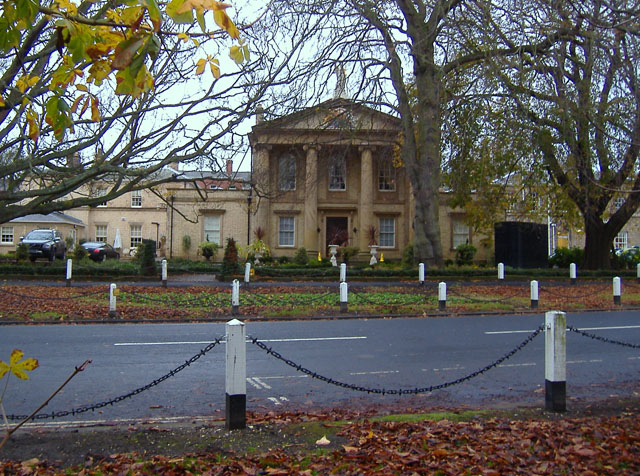

- Location of Sessions House in the East Riding of Yorkshire
- 53.8477°N 0.4412°W
- Location: Beverley, East Riding of Yorkshire

History
- Built: 1814

Site notes
- Architect: Watson and Pritchett
- Architectural style: Classical style

Listed Building – Grade II*
- Designated: 1 March 1950
- Reference no.: 1162300

The Sessions House was a municipal facility at New Walk in Beverley, East Riding of Yorkshire, England. The building, which was the main courthouse for the East Riding of Yorkshire, is a Grade II* listed building.

== History ==
The first sessions house in Beverley was located in a building at Hall Garth on a site which had previously accommodated the archbishop's manor house. In the early 19th century the justices decided to allow the lease on the building at Hall Garth to expire and, instead, chose to procure a new sessions house in New Walk. A prison facility or "house of correction", which could accommodate around 60 prisoners at a time, had already been built in Norfolk Street, to the rear of the proposed site for the sessions house, in 1810.

The new building, which was designed by Watson and Pritchett in the classical style, was completed in 1814. The design involved a symmetrical main frontage with five bays facing onto New Walk; the central section of three bays featured a two-storey tetrastyle portico with full height Ionic order columns; the doorway was flanked by windows on the ground floor and there were three arched windows on the first floor; there was a large pediment containing a Royal coat of arms topped with a figure of justice above. The quarter sessions and the petty sessions were both held in the courtroom.

After the prisoners had been dispersed to alternative facilities in the West Riding, the prison closed in 1878 and prison buildings were subsequently converted into private housing. The sessions house continued to be used as the local facility for dispensing justice but, in the late 19th century, along with the Guildhall, it was also used as the meeting place for the East Riding County Council until County Hall was completed in 1891. Facilities for the local police force were established in an adjacent building to the north of the sessions house and substantially enlarged when the police station became a constabulary headquarters in 1930.

The sessions house continued to be used as a courthouse throughout the 20th century, latterly for the Crown Court, and repairs were carried out to the roof to extend the use of the building in 1984. It ceased operating as a courthouse in 1988 and was empty and deteriorating until it was marketed for sale in 1999. It was then converted for commercial use and re-opened as a spa, beauty salon and boutique in 2004. In March 2019 it featured in the Channel 5 television series "The House of Extraordinary People".

== See also ==
- Grade II* listed buildings in the East Riding of Yorkshire
- Listed buildings in Beverley (north area)
