= 1981 Humberside County Council election =

1981 UK local government election

- 7 May 1981

All 75 seats to Humberside County Council 38 seats needed for a majority
	First party	Second party	Third party
Party	Labour	Conservative	Liberal
Seats won	42	32	1
Popular vote	114,318	92,602	37,061
Percentage	44.74%	36.24%	14.50%
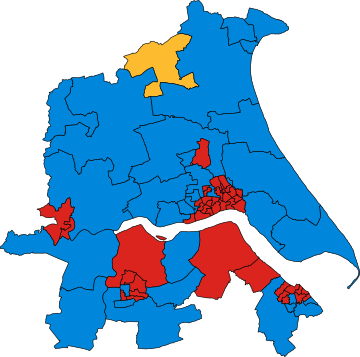
- Map of the results of the election in each division. Colours denote the winning party, as shown in the main table of results.
Council control before election
Conservative
Council control after election
Labour

The 1981 Humberside County Council election was held on Thursday, 7 May. Following boundary changes to the county's electoral divisions, the whole council of 75 members was up for election. The Labour Party regained control of the council from the Conservative Party, winning 42 seats.

Humberside was created as a non-metropolitan county in England by the Local Government Act 1972, with the first elections to the county council taking place in 1973. It was abolished on 1 April 1996 and replaced by East Riding of Yorkshire, Kingston upon Hull, North East Lincolnshire and North Lincolnshire.

== Results by division ==
Each electoral division returned one county councillor. The candidate elected to the council in each electoral division is shown in the table below. "Unopposed" indicates that the councillor was elected unopposed.

Electoral division	Party	Councillor	Votes
Beverley Rural	Conservative	A. Pollard	2,033
Boothferry West	Labour	D. Rose	1,855
Bottesford	Conservative	H. Fletcher	1,741
Bridlington North	Conservative	D. Tarran	Unopposed
Bridlington Old Town	Conservative	D. Connelly	1,461
Bridlington South	Conservative	I. Macdonald	1,905
Cleethorpes - Croft Baker	Labour	R. Neal	1,137
Cleethorpes - Haverstoe	Conservative	A. Turner	1,776
Cleethorpes - Park	Labour	J. Hoyle	1,894
Cottingham North	Conservative	J. West	2,194
Cottingham South	Conservative	G. Stroud	1,550
Dale	Conservative	A. Langdale	1,972
Driffield & Rural	Liberal	P. Redshaw	1,539
East Wolds & Coastal	Conservative	D. Duke	1,810
Ermine	Labour	D. Poirer	2,641
Ferry (Glanford)	Labour	J. Mumby	1,411
Goole	Labour	D. Brown	2,280
Grimsby - Freshney	Labour	J. Sterling	1,675
Grimsby - Heneage	Labour	M. Parker	2,144
Grimsby - Marsh	Labour	V. Burgess	2,071
Grimsby - North East	Labour	F. Franklin	2,143
Grimsby - Park	Conservative	S. Blackbourn	2,047
Grimsby - Scartho	Conservative	M. Rudkin	2,202
Grimsby - South	Labour	W. Wilkins	2,466
Grimsby - Yarborough	Labour	R. Buckley	2,405
Haven	Conservative	R. Huss	1,946
Hessle	Labour	J. Ainsworth	1,759
Howdenshire	Conservative	L. Clayton	2,487
Humberston	Conservative	M. Field	1,939
Immingham	Labour	E. Blackband	2,084
Kingston upon Hull - Alexandra	Labour	M. Wheaton	2,449
Kingston upon Hull - Avenue	Labour	C. Sargeson	1,475
Kingston upon Hull - Bellfield	Labour	T. Geraghty	2,838
Kingston upon Hull - Bilton Grange	Labour	C. Brady	2,888
Kingston upon Hull - Derringham	Labour	F. Moore	2,292
Kingston upon Hull - Drypool	Labour	A. Fee	2,397
Kingston upon Hull - East Bransholme	Labour	N. Kendrew	2,333
Kingston upon Hull - East Ella	Labour	E. Walgate	1,552
Kingston upon Hull - East Park	Labour	S. Salingar	1,746
Kingston upon Hull - Endike	Labour	G. Templeman	2,940
Kingston upon Hull - Ferry	Labour	J. Considine	2,083
Kingston upon Hull - Inglemire	Conservative	L. Hall	1,418
Kingston upon Hull - Longhill	Labour	N. Stephenson	3,048
Kingston upon Hull - Marfleet	Labour	H. Whatling	2,443
Kingston upon Hull - Myton	Labour	M. Smith	2,550
Kingston upon Hull - Newington	Labour	G. Chapman	1,933
Kingston upon Hull - Newland	Labour	E. Tarlton	1,945
Kingston upon Hull - Orchard Park	Labour	H. Dalton	3,173
Kingston upon Hull - Park	Labour	K. Robinson	2,011
Kingston upon Hull - Pickering	Labour	J. Pearlman	3,136
Kingston upon Hull - St. Andrews	Labour	R. Wallis	1,976
Kingston upon Hull - Sutton	Labour	W. Haughey	1,922
Kingston upon Hull - West Bransholme	Labour	L. Bird	1,695
Mid Boothferry	Conservative	D. Haynes	1,761
Mid Holderness	Conservative	R. Croft	1,790
Minster	Labour	A. Dobson	1,632
North Holderness	Conservative	D. Southwick	1,927
Pocklington Provincial	Conservative	N. Knight	1,574
Ridge	Conservative	T. Atherton	1,620
Scunthorpe - Ashby	Labour	A. Bryan	1,978
Scunthorpe - Brumby	Labour	V. Wilson	1,896
Scunthorpe - Crosby & Park	Labour	W. Martin	1,910
Scunthorpe - Frodingham & Town	Labour	D. Spooner	2,004
Scunthorpe - Kingsway	Conservative	H. Lewis	1,929
Scunthorpe - Lincoln Gardens	Labour	J. Sturman	2,052
South Axholme	Conservative	D. Stewart	2,111
South Hunsley	Conservative	A. Ramshaw	2,277
South East Holderness	Conservative	R. Armitage	1,609
South West Holderness	Conservative	H. Procter	1,348
St. Marys	Conservative	T. Martin	1,841
Tranby	Conservative	C. Sonley	2,339
Wold	Conservative	G. Appleyard	1,968
Wold Parishes	Conservative	V. McCracken	1,936
Wolds Weighton	Conservative	K. Wilson	1,821
Wolfreton	Conservative	E. Eaton	1,684
