= County Hall, Beverley =

County building in Beverley, East Riding of Yorkshire, England

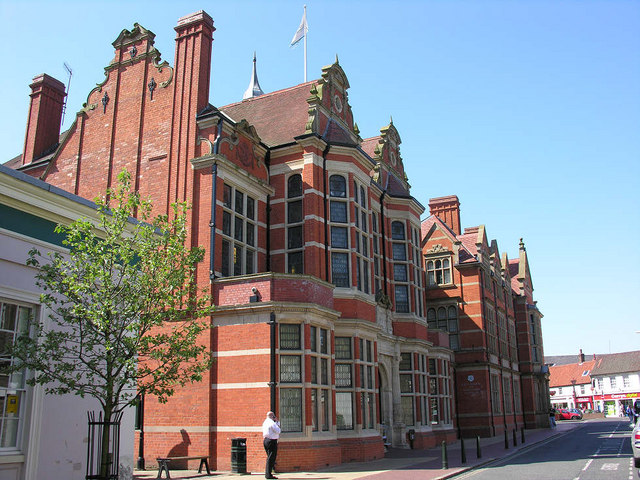

- Location of County Hall, Beverley in the East Riding of Yorkshire
- 53.8409°N 0.4302°W
- Location: Beverley, East Riding of Yorkshire

History
- Built: 1881

Site notes
- Architect(s): R. G. Smith and Frederick Stead Brodrick
- Architectural style: Flemish Renaissance style

Listed Building – Grade II
- Designated: 1 March 1950
- Reference no.: 1346321

County Hall is a municipal building in Cross Street, Beverley, East Riding of Yorkshire, England. County Hall, which is the headquarters of East Riding of Yorkshire Council, is a Grade II listed building.

== History ==
Following the implementation of the Local Government Act 1888, which established county councils in every county, it became necessary to find a meeting place for the East Riding County Council. Initially meetings of the county council were held in the Sessions House and in the Guildhall. After deciding the old Sessions House and Guildhall were inadequate for their needs, county leaders chose to procure a new county headquarters: the site selected in Cross Street had been occupied by the former Mechanics Institute.

A new purpose-built building, designed by R. G. Smith and Frederick Stead Brodrick in the Flemish Renaissance style, was completed in 1891. The design involved a main frontage with eleven bays facing onto Cross Street; the left-hand section of five bays, which was symmetrical, featured an elaborately carved stone doorway on the ground floor flanked by composite order columns, with three tall mullion windows on the first floor; the right-hand section of six bays, which was asymmetrical, featured a porch flanked by Doric order columns and topped with a pediment containing the county coat of arms, with tall mullion windows on the first and second floors. Internally, the principal room was the council chamber which contained fine furniture carved by the wood carver and cabinet maker, James Elwell.

Main portal

In the 1930s the novelist, Winifred Holtby, attended council meetings in the council chamber to obtain inspiration for her book South Riding which won the James Tait Black Memorial Prize in 1936.

Following the abolition of East Riding County Council in 1974, the building became the offices of Humberside County Council. A large modern office block, intended to create additional facilities for the county council, was built on Champney Road and opened in 1983. Local government was reorganised again, with the abolition of Humberside County Council in 1996, and county hall became the offices of the new unitary authority, East Riding of Yorkshire Council at that time. The council chamber was refurbished in late 2019.

== See also ==
- Listed buildings in Beverley (south area)
