= Frederick Stead Brodrick =

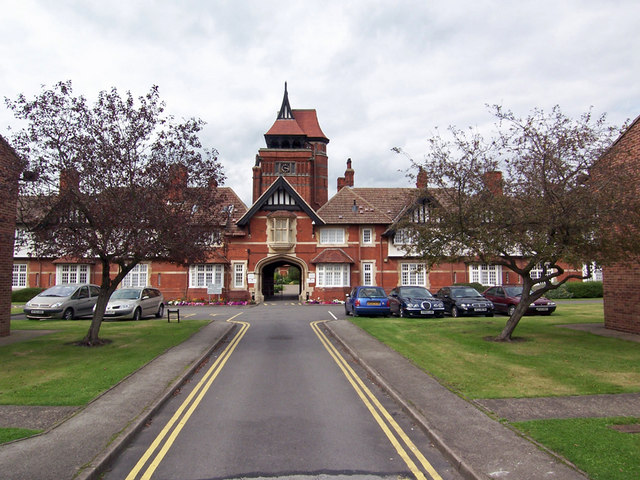
Northumberland Court Almshouses, 1884–86

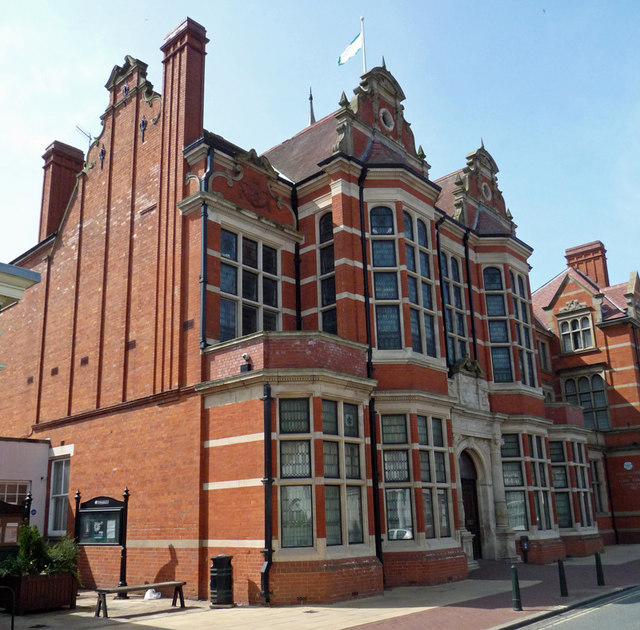
County Hall, Beverley, 1890–91

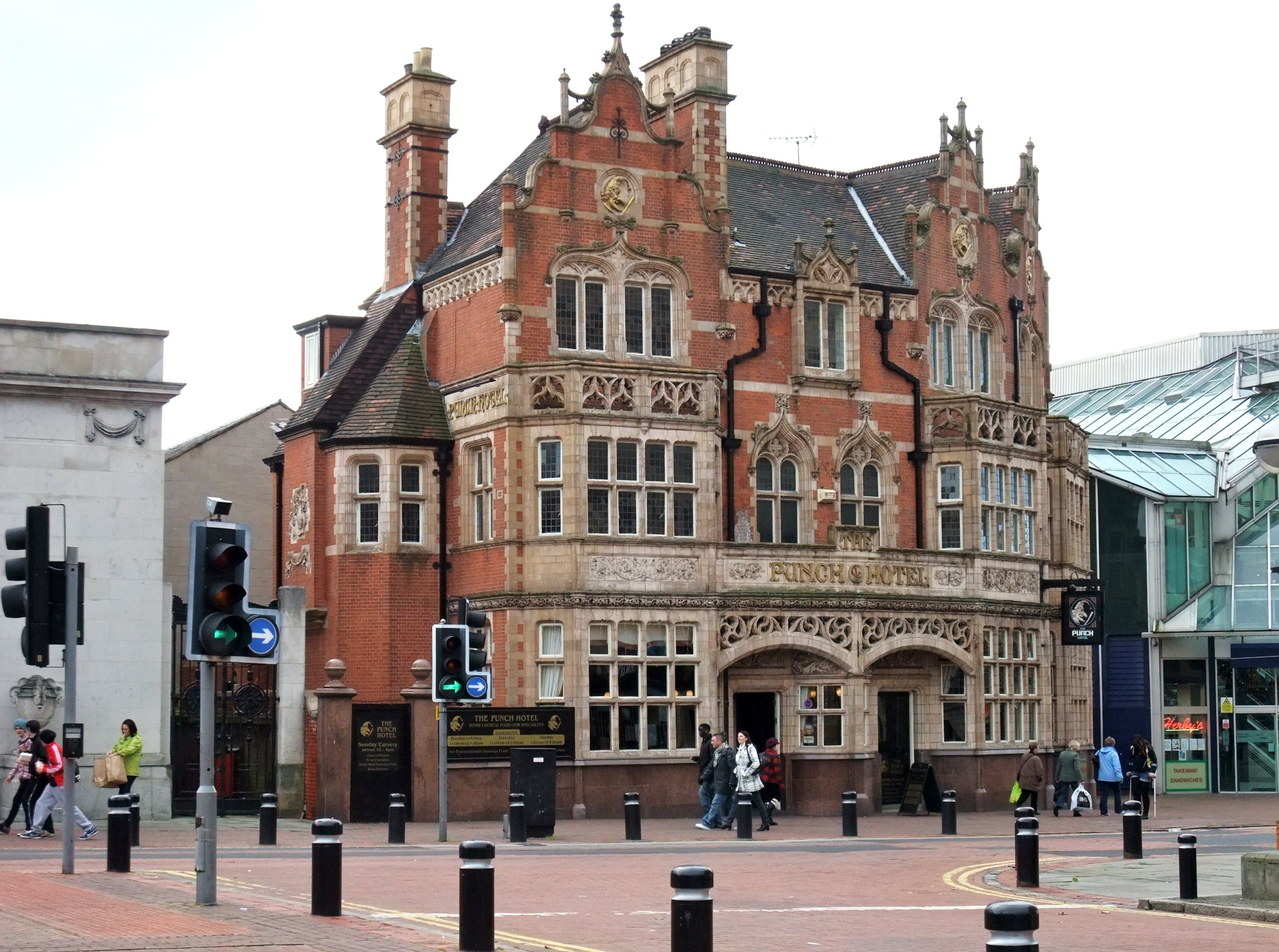
Punch Hotel, 1896–98

Frederick Stead Brodrick (7 August 1847 – 23 April 1927) was an architect based in Kingston upon Hull, England.

== Life ==
He was born on 7 August 1847 in Kingston upon Hull, the son of John Brodrick (1805–1869) and Sarah Stead (1811–1892). He was a nephew of the architect Cuthbert Brodrick (1822–1905). He married Frances Ann Flowers (1851–1886) in 1875 in Caistor Lincolnshire. He married secondly Mary Beatrice Earle (1864–1938) in 1888 in Kingston upon Hull. Having initials FSB, he was known as "Fusby".

He died on 23 April 1927 in Scalby, near Scarborough and left an estate valued at £19,715 (equivalent to £1,486,400 in 2023).

== Career ==
He entered into the practice of his uncle, Cuthbert Brodrick, in 1870 when Cuthbert gave up architecture and moved to France. Frederick went into partnership with Richard George Smith as Smith & Brodrick. In the early 1890s they were joined by Arthur Lowther.

He was a member of the Royal Institute of British Architects. He was a partner in the form of Smith and Brodrick of Bowlalley Lane in Hull. For many years he was Diocesan Surveyor of the Diocese of York and was responsible for the building and restoration of many churches in Hull and the East Riding.

== Works ==
- All Saints’ Church, Margaret Street, Hull (tower)
- Lunatic Asylum, Willerby
- All Saints’ Church, Tunstall 1873–74 (restoration)
- Cogan House, Bowlalley Lane, Hull 1876–8
- St John The Baptists’ Church, St George's Road, Hull 1878
- St Nicholas' Church, Beverley 1879–80
- All Saint's Church, Roos, East Yorkshire 1881 (organ chamber)
- Old White Hart Inn, Silver Street, Hull, 1881 (remodelling)
- St James’ Church, Sutton-on-Hull, 1883 (organ chamber)
- Beverley Minster Parish Hall, 1885
- Northumberland Court Almshouses, Hull 1884–86
- St Patrick's Church, Patrington 1884–86 (restoration)
- St Andrew's Church, Kirk Ella 1886–87 (restoration)
- East Riding Police Court, Beverley 1887 (enlargement)
- County Hall, Cross Street, Beverley 1890–91
- Grammar School, Leicester Street, Hull 1890–??
- St Stephens Church & St Stephens House, Newport 1890
- Pearson Park Hotel, Hull 1892
- St Augustine's Church, Skirlaugh, 1892-93 (restoration)
- St Gregory's School and Chapel, Scott Street/Lockwood Street, Hull 1893
- Punch Hotel, Queen Victoria Square, Hull 1896–98
- Hull and Sculcoates Dispensary, Boulevard 1898
- St Helen's Church, Skeffling 1900–01 (restoration)
- Holy Trinity Church, Hull 1906–08 (undrpinning)
- Hornsea Church Institute, 1906
