= Humberside County Council =

British administrative body (1974–1996)

History
- Founded: 1 April 1974
- Disbanded: 31 March 1996
- Succeeded by: North Lincolnshire; North East Lincolnshire; Kingston upon Hull; East Riding of Yorkshire

Elections
- First election: 12 April 1973
- Last election: 6 May 1993

Meeting place
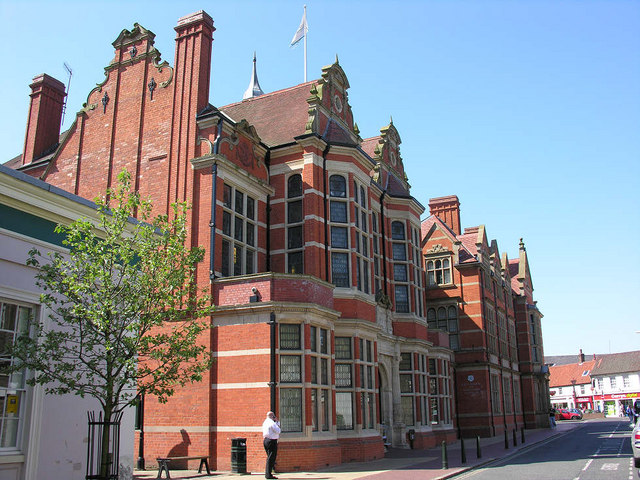
- County Hall, Cross Street, Beverley

Humberside County Council was the county council of the non-metropolitan county of Humberside in northern England, which was created in 1974 and abolished in 1996.

== History ==
Humberside was a non-metropolitan county governed by Humberside County Council and nine non-metropolitan district councils. The county council came into its powers on 1 April 1974 and was abolished in 1996. The county council was based at County Hall in Beverley. On 1 April 1996 the county council was replaced with four unitary authorities: North Lincolnshire, North East Lincolnshire, Kingston upon Hull and East Riding of Yorkshire.

The coat of arms was submitted to the council for approval by a resident of Humberside (in Thorngumbald), and depicts several characters in the blazon. The shield bears two Yorkshire roses, a pair of gold fleur-de-lys for Lincolnshire and a gold ducet for Hull. The crest depicts a blue eagle issuing from the old East Riding arms - an allusion of the new deriving from the old. The eagles has droplets on its wings, representing North Sea oil. A sword represents Scunthorpe steel, with a dolphin, anchor, waves and globe representing the docks and shipping of the Humber, and the goddess Ceres represents agriculture.

== Political control ==
The first election to the council was held in 1973, initially operating as a shadow authority before coming into its powers on 1 April 1974. Political control of the council from 1974 until its abolition in 1996 was as follows:

Party in control	Years
Labour	1974–1977
Conservative	1977–1981
Labour	1981–1985
No overall control	1985–1989
Labour	1989–1996

=== Leadership ===
The leaders of the council were:

Councillor	Party	From	To
Harry Lewis	Labour	1 Apr 1974	May 1977
John Townend	Conservative	May 1977	May 1979
Spencer Rudkin	Conservative	9 May 1979	May 1981
Michael Wheaton	Labour	May 1981	May 1984
Terry Geraghty	Labour	May 1984	May 1992
Maggie Smith	Labour	13 May 1992	31 Mar 1996

== Council elections ==
- 1973 Humberside County Council election
- 1977 Humberside County Council election
- 1981 Humberside County Council election
- 1985 Humberside County Council election
- 1989 Humberside County Council election
- 1993 Humberside County Council election

== County result maps ==
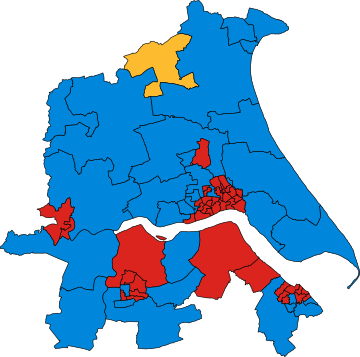
1981 results map
