= East Riding County Council =

Former county council of the East Riding of Yorkshire

- Coat of arms

History
- Founded: 1 April 1889
- Disbanded: 31 March 1974
- Succeeded by: Humberside County Council

Meeting place
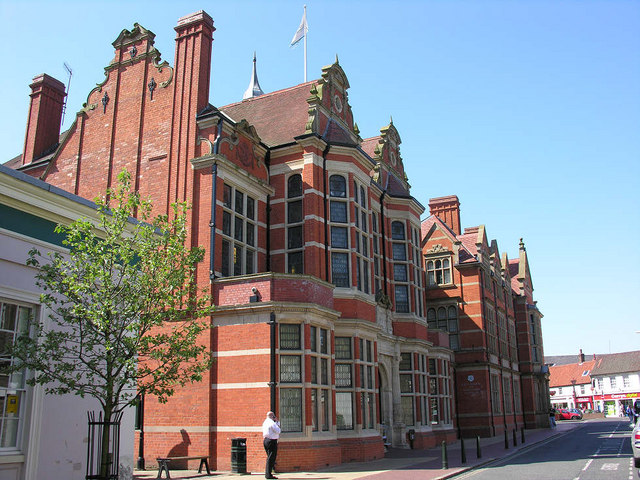
- County Hall, Beverley

East Riding County Council (ERCC) was the county council of the East Riding of Yorkshire (excluding the county borough of Kingston upon Hull) from 1 April 1889 to 31 March 1974.

In 1974, under the Local Government Act 1972, the historic established lieutenancy and administrative county were disbanded, being replaced by the newly created Humberside County Council which included most of the East Riding and additional parts of the West Riding and parts of Lincolnshire.

== Chairmen ==
- 1889–1890: David Burton (resigned)
- 1890–1891: Beilby Lawley, 3rd Baron Wenlock (resigned; first time)
- 1891–1901: Sir Charles Legard, 11th Baronet
- 1902–1912: Beilby Lawley, 3rd Baron Wenlock (second time)
- 1912–1936: Robert de Yarburgh-Bateson, 3rd Baron Deramore
- 1936–1968: Sir John Dunnington-Jefferson, 1st Baronet
- 1968–1974: Charles Wood, 2nd Earl of Halifax
