= East Riding of Yorkshire =

County of England

Coordinates: 53°55′N 0°30′W

- Ceremonial county
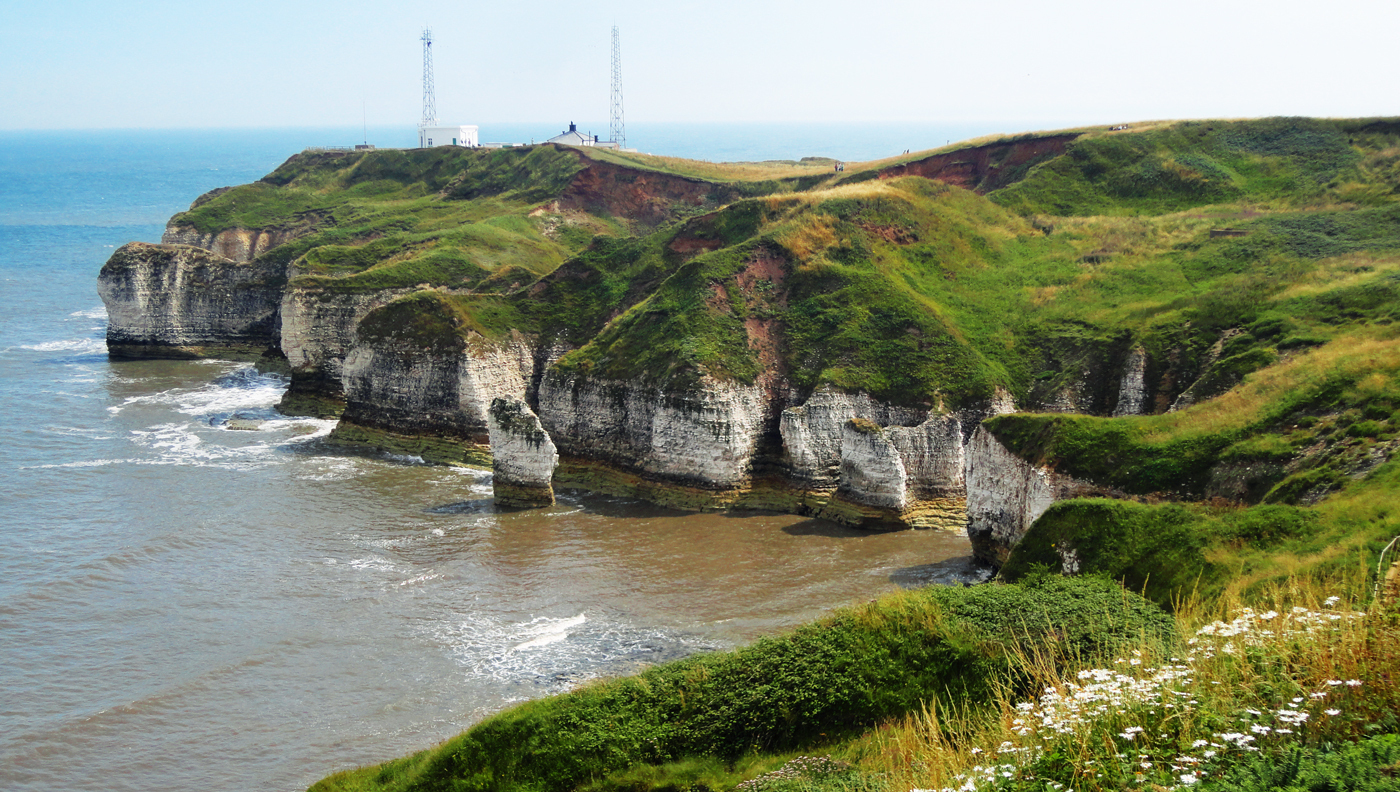
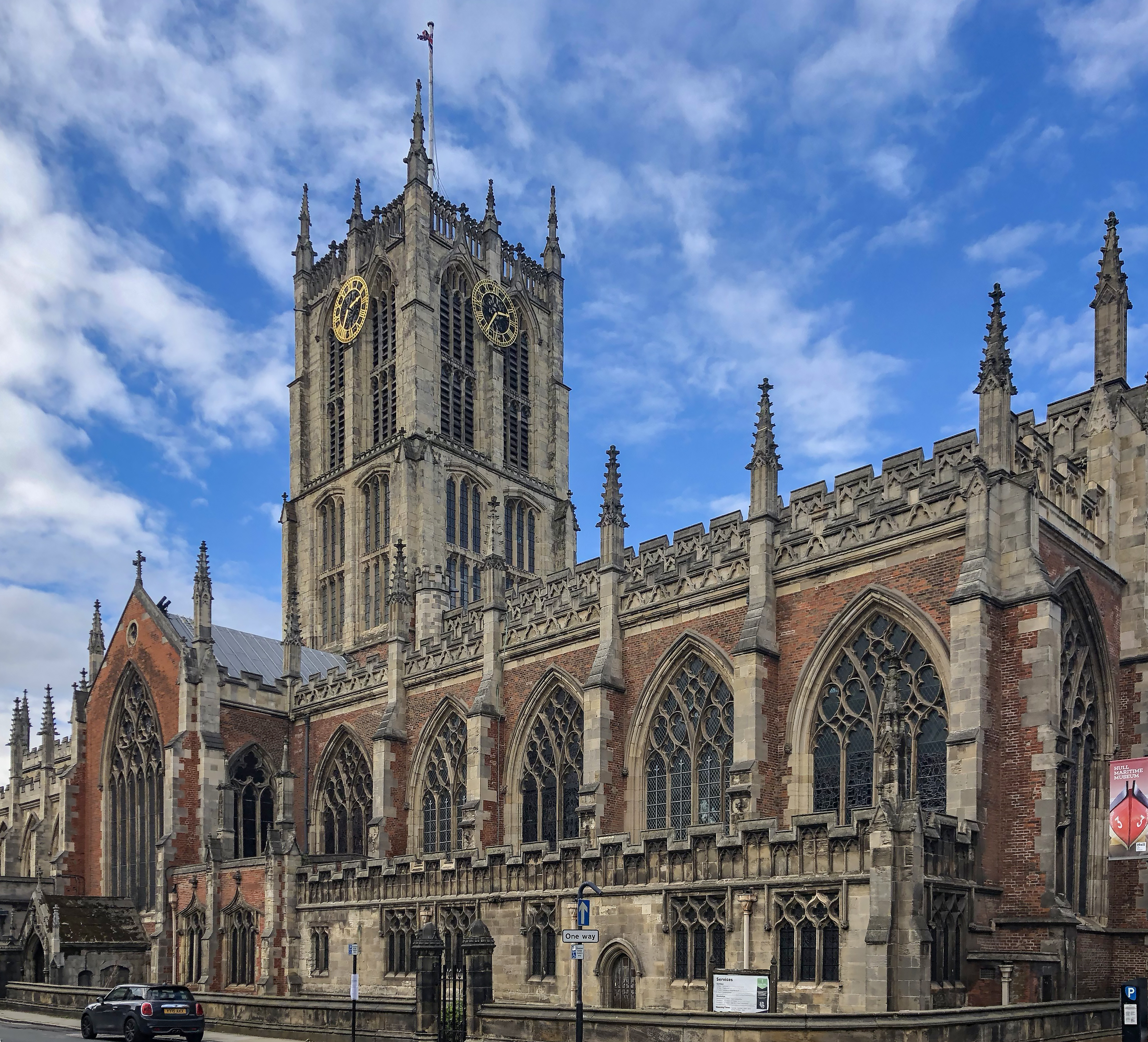
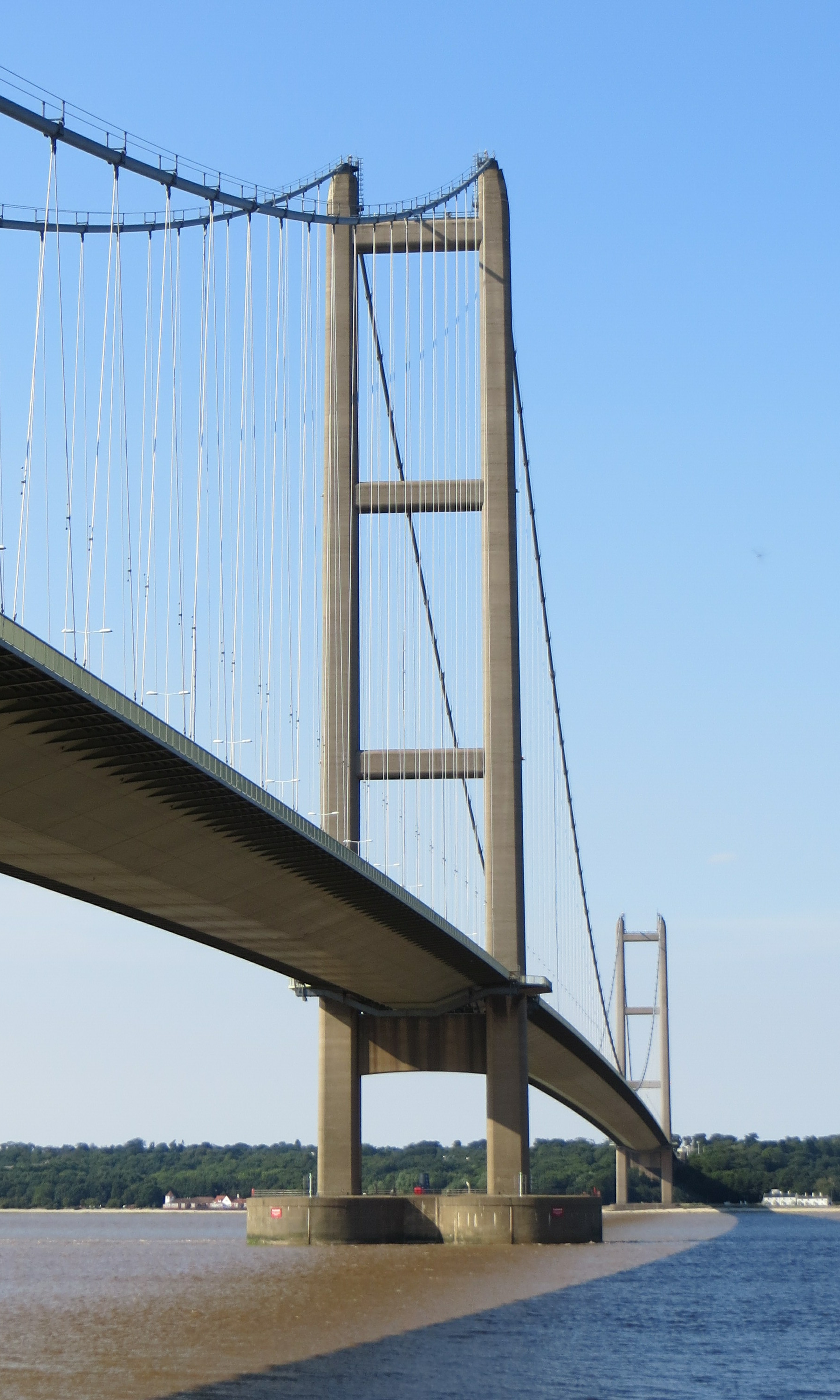
- Clockwise from top: Flamborough Head; the Humber Bridge, which links the county to Lincolnshire; and Hull Minster

- Ceremonial East Riding of Yorkshire within England Hull and East Yorkshire strategic authority area within England District East Riding of Yorkshire within England Historic East Riding within Yorkshire and England
- Sovereign state: United Kingdom
- Constituent country: England
- Region: Yorkshire and the Humber
- Established: 1 April 1996
- Established by: Local Government Commission for England
- Preceded by: Humberside (1974–1996)
- Origin: Geographic county/ administrative county (1889–1974) • Historic riding (AD 889 – 1 April 1889)
- Time zone: UTC+0 (GMT)
  - Summer (DST): UTC+1 (BST)
- UK Parliament: 6: David Davis (C); Charlie Dewhirst (C); Emma Hardy (L); Diana Johnson (L); Graham Stuart (C); Karl Turner (L)
- Largest city: Hull
- Ceremonial county
- Lord Lieutenant: James Dick
- High Sheriff: Neil Philip Sanderson
- Area: 2,475 km^{2} (956 sq mi)
  - Rank: 23rd of 48
- Population (2024): 631,285
  - Rank: 38th of 48
  - Density: 255/km^{2} (660/sq mi)
- Unitary authorities
- Councils: Hull City Council; hullcc.gov.uk
- Unitary authority
- Council: East Riding of Yorkshire Council
- Control: No overall control
- Admin HQ: Beverley
- Area: 2,404 km^{2} (928 sq mi)
  - Rank: 10th of 296
- Population (2025): 360,334
  - Rank: 28th of 296
  - Density: 150/km^{2} (390/sq mi)
- ISO 3166-2: GB-ERY
- GSS code: E06000011
- ITL: UKE11/12
- Website: eastriding.gov.uk
- Districts
- Districts of East Riding of Yorkshire; Unitary
- Districts: 1. East Riding of Yorkshire; 2. City of Kingston upon Hull

The East Riding of Yorkshire, often abbreviated to the East Riding or East Yorkshire, is a ceremonial county in the Yorkshire and the Humber region of England. It borders North Yorkshire to the north and west, South Yorkshire to the south-west, and Lincolnshire to the south across the Humber Estuary. The city of Kingston upon Hull is the largest settlement.

The county has an area of 2,479 km^{2} (957 sq mi) and an estimated population of 631,285 in 2024. Kingston upon Hull, in the south-centre of the county on the Humber Estuary, is a major port and the county's economic and transport centre. The rest of the county is largely rural, and the next largest towns are the seaside resort of Bridlington on the north-east coast and the historic town of Beverley near the centre. For local government purposes the county comprises the unitary authority areas of the East Riding of Yorkshire and the City of Kingston upon Hull. Their local authorities collaborate through the Hull and East Yorkshire Combined Authority. The county takes its name from the East Riding, an historic subdivision of Yorkshire.

In the east of the county the low-lying plain of Holderness is enclosed by a crescent of low chalk hills, the Yorkshire Wolds. The Wolds meet the sea at Flamborough Head, a chalk headland, while the Holderness coast to the south is characterised by clay cliffs. The west of the county is part of the Vale of York, the wide plain of the River Ure/Ouse, and the south-west is part of the Humberhead Levels.

== History ==
=== Prehistoric ===
When the last glacial period ended, the hunter gatherers of the Palaeolithic period followed the animal herds across the land between continental Europe and Britain. Then, as conditions continued to improve and vegetation could support a greater diversity of animals, the annual range of seasonal movement by Mesolithic communities decreased, and people became more fixed to particular localities. Until about 6000 BC, Mesolithic people appear to have exploited their environment as they found it. As communities came to rely on a smaller territorial range and as population levels increased, they started to try to modify or control the natural world. In the Great Wold Valley, pollen samples of Mesolithic date indicate that the forest cover in the area was being disturbed and altered by man, and that open grasslands were being created. The Yorkshire Wolds became a major focus for human settlement during the Neolithic period as they had a wide range of natural resources. The oldest monuments found on the Wolds are the Neolithic long barrows and round barrows. Two earthen long barrows in the region are found at Fordon, on Willerby Wold, and at Kilham, near Driffield, both of which have radiocarbon dates of around 3700 BC.

From around 2000 to 800 BC, the people of the Bronze Age built the 1,400 Bronze Age round barrows that are known to exist on the Yorkshire Wolds. These are found both in isolation and grouped together to form cemeteries. Many of these sites can still be seen as prominent features in the present-day landscape. By the later Bronze Age, an open, cleared, landscape predominated on the Wolds. It was used for grazing and also for arable cultivation. The wetlands on either side of the Wolds in the River Hull valley, Holderness and the Vale of York were also being used for animal rearing at this time. In the Iron Age there were further cultural changes in the area. There emerged a distinctive local tradition known as the Arras Culture, named after a site at Arras, near Market Weighton. There are similarities between the chariot burials of the Arras Culture and groups of La Tène burials in northern Europe, where the burial of carts was also practiced.

=== Brythonic, Latin and Germanic ===
The area became the kingdom of the tribe known as the Parisi. After invading Britain in AD 43, the Romans crossed the Humber Estuary in AD 71 to invade the Parisi tribe's territory. From their bridgehead at Petuaria they travelled northwards and built roads along the Wolds to Derventio, present-day Malton, and then westwards to the River Ouse where they built the fort of Eboracum. There is evidence of extensive use of the light soils of the Wolds for grain farming in the Roman era. Several Roman villas which were the centres of large agricultural estates have been identified around Langton and Rudston. In the low-lying lands on either side of the Wolds there was an increase in the number of settlements between 500 BC and AD 500, as the land became drier and more accessible due to a fall in sea level. The lower-lying land was used for stock breeding. During the last years of Roman Britain, Anglo-Saxon raiders were troubling the area. After the Romans, the Brythonic-speaking area became known as Deira.

By the second half of the 5th century, the continued settlement by the Angles caused a shift to Old English. Deira merged into Northumbria and village names containing the Anglian elements -ing, -ingham or -ham started to be found in settlement names. As Christianity was established in the area from the 7th century onwards, several cemeteries like the one at Garton on the Wolds show evidence of the abandonment of pagan burial practices. In AD 867, the Great Danish Army captured the Anglian town of York. The remnants of the army settled from AD 876 as their leader Halfdan shared out the land. The Danish consolidated the area into the Kingdom of Jorvik, Danelaw then the Norse North Sea Empire. Scandinavian settlement names started to be found, such as -by and -thorpe. Scandinavian rule in the area came to an end in AD 954 with the death of Eric Bloodaxe.

=== Medieval ===
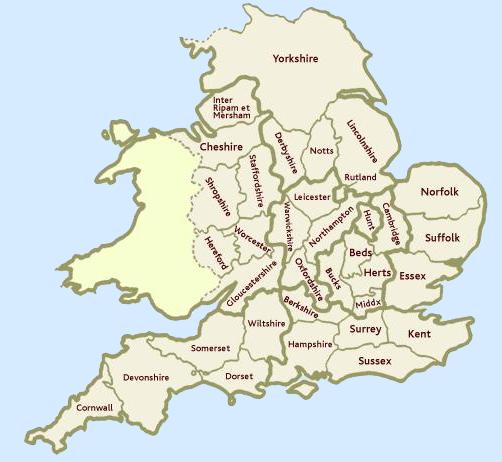
Counties of England after the Norman Conquest

After the Norman Conquest of England by William the Conqueror in AD 1066, land across England was granted to followers of the new Norman king and ecclesiastical institutions. When some of the northern earls rebelled, William retaliated with the Harrying of the North which laid waste to many northern villages. The land was then distributed among powerful barons, such as the Count of Aumale in Holderness and the Percy family in the Wolds and the Vale of York. These lay lords and ecclesiastical institutions, including the monasteries, continued to improve and drain their holdings throughout the Middle Ages to maximise the rents they could charge for them. The governance structure in the Domesday survey of 1086 was Yorkshire, its ridings and Wapentakes—the latter two remnants of the Norse structure.

The contemporary flag of the historic East Riding of Yorkshire

In the mid-16th century Henry VIII of England dissolved the monasteries, resulting in the large areas of land owned by Meaux Abbey, Bridlington Priory and other monastic holdings being confiscated. The Crown subsequently sold these large tracts of land into private ownership. Along with the land already belonging to lay owners, they formed some of the vast estate holdings which continued to exist in the Riding until the 20th century.

== Geography ==
=== Location ===
The traditional cultural and historic geographic county, the East Riding of Yorkshire borders the North Sea to the east of the county. To the north across the River Derwent is the North Riding of Yorkshire, and to the west across the River Ouse is the West Riding of Yorkshire.

In terms of neighbouring local government administration, the East Riding of Yorkshire unitary authority adjoins North Yorkshire to the north, north-west and to the west, South Yorkshire metropolitan area to the south-west and Lincolnshire across the Humber Estuary to the south. The City of Kingston upon Hull is a separate unitary authority immediately to the south and forms part of the ceremonial county area. Other councils areas adjacent to the unitary authority include North East Lincolnshire, beyond the Humber Estuary; North Lincolnshire, beyond the Humber and on land; Hull, Doncaster, North Yorkshire and York.

=== Geology ===
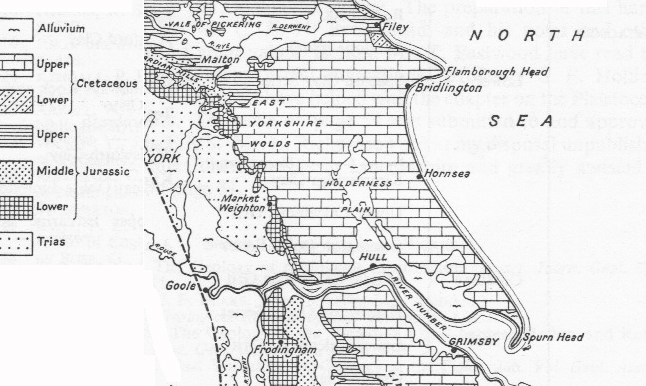
Solid geology of the East Riding

Geologically the East Riding district is split into three parts. The western part is the eastern section of the Vale of York with the southern extension into the Humberhead Levels. In this area there is a belt of sandstones overlain by glacial and lake deposits formed at the close of the last ice age. The middle part is the Yorkshire Wolds, a chalk formation which extends from the Humber at North Ferriby to the coast at Flamborough Head, a chalk headland. The south-east of the district is the low-lying coastal plain of Holderness, which faces east to the North Sea, and to the south drains into the Humber Estuary. South of Flamborough Head is Bridlington, which features several beaches, and at the far south-east of the district is the Spurn peninsula.

Before the last ice age the eastern coastline of the area was located along the eastern foot of the Yorkshire Wolds where remnants of beaches have been discovered. The North Sea ice sheet deposited huge amounts of boulder clay as it retreated and this subsequently formed a wet and swampy area which became the plain of Holderness. Another ice sheet in the Vale of York retreated at the same time leaving thick glacial deposits and two prominent moraines to the west of the Wolds. These Vale of York deposits also formed wetlands. The Wolds themselves were largely ice-free, well-drained, chalk uplands. Gradually the tundra conditions that had existed as the ice retreated gave way to vegetation that could support grazing fauna. Because a lot of water was still locked in the northern ice sheets, sea level was much lower than in the present day and an area of land stretched eastwards to the low countries.

=== Landscape ===
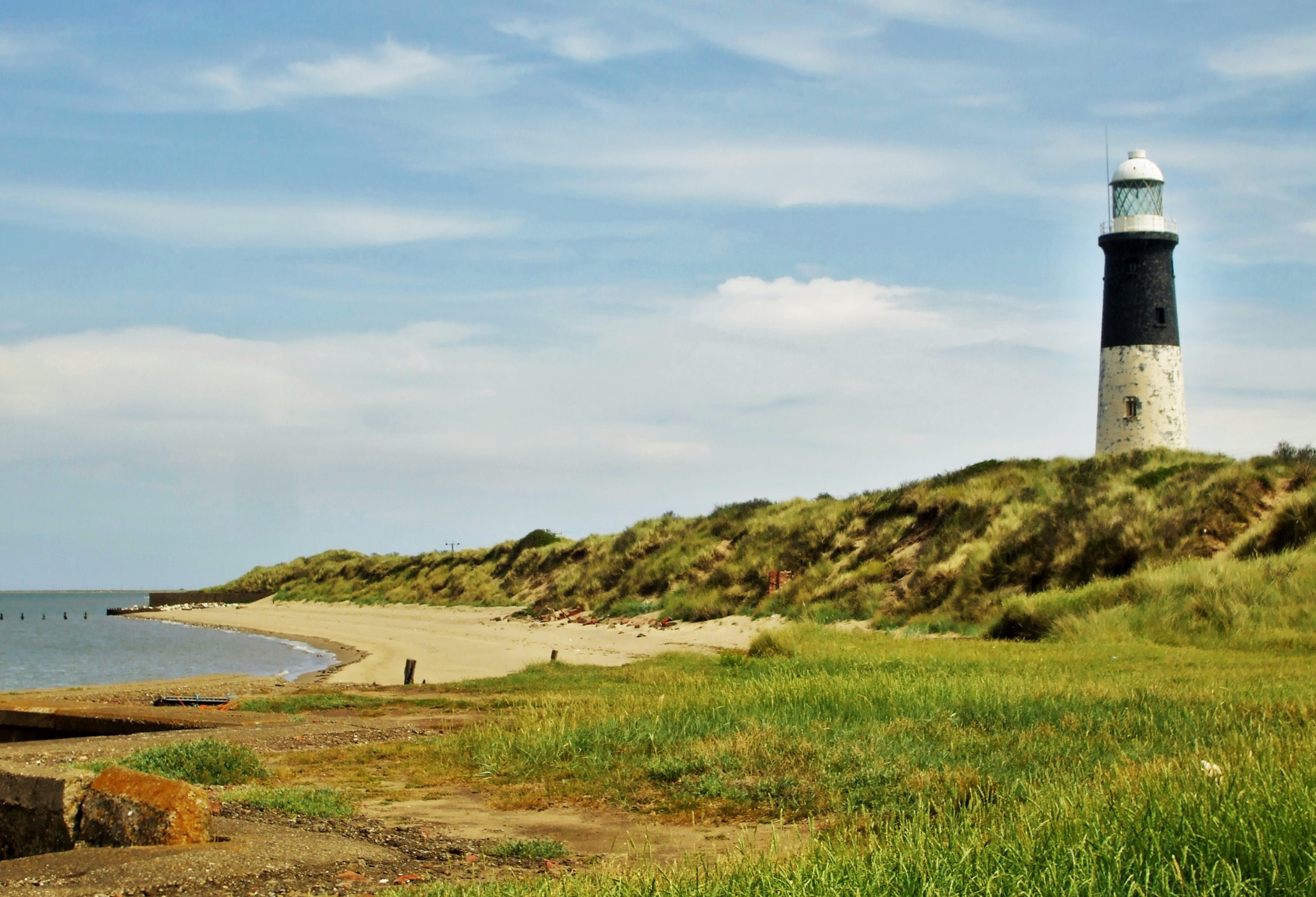
Spurn, a tidal island at the mouth of the Humber Estuary

The Wolds area takes the form of an elevated, gently rolling plateau, cut by numerous deep, steep-sided, flat-bottomed valleys of glacial origin. The chalk formation of the hills provides exceptionally good drainage, with the result that most of these valleys are dry. Surface water is quite scarce throughout the Wolds. At Flamborough Head the Wolds rise up to form high chalk cliffs, where there are water-worn caves and stacks along the shore. Flamborough Headland is designated a Heritage Coast. Coastal erosion around Flamborough Head has led to visitors being warned by the Humber Coastguard to be very careful on coastal paths.

The Holderness landscape is dominated by deposits of till, boulder clays and glacial lake clays. These were deposited during the Devensian glaciation. The glacial deposits form a more or less continuous lowland plain which has some peat filled depressions (known locally as meres) which mark the presence of former lake beds. There are other glacial landscape features such as drumlin mounds, ridges and kettle holes scattered throughout the area. The well-drained glacial deposits provide fertile soils that can support intensive arable cultivation. Fields are generally large and bounded by drainage ditches. There is very little woodland in the area, and this leads to a landscape that is essentially rural but very flat and exposed.

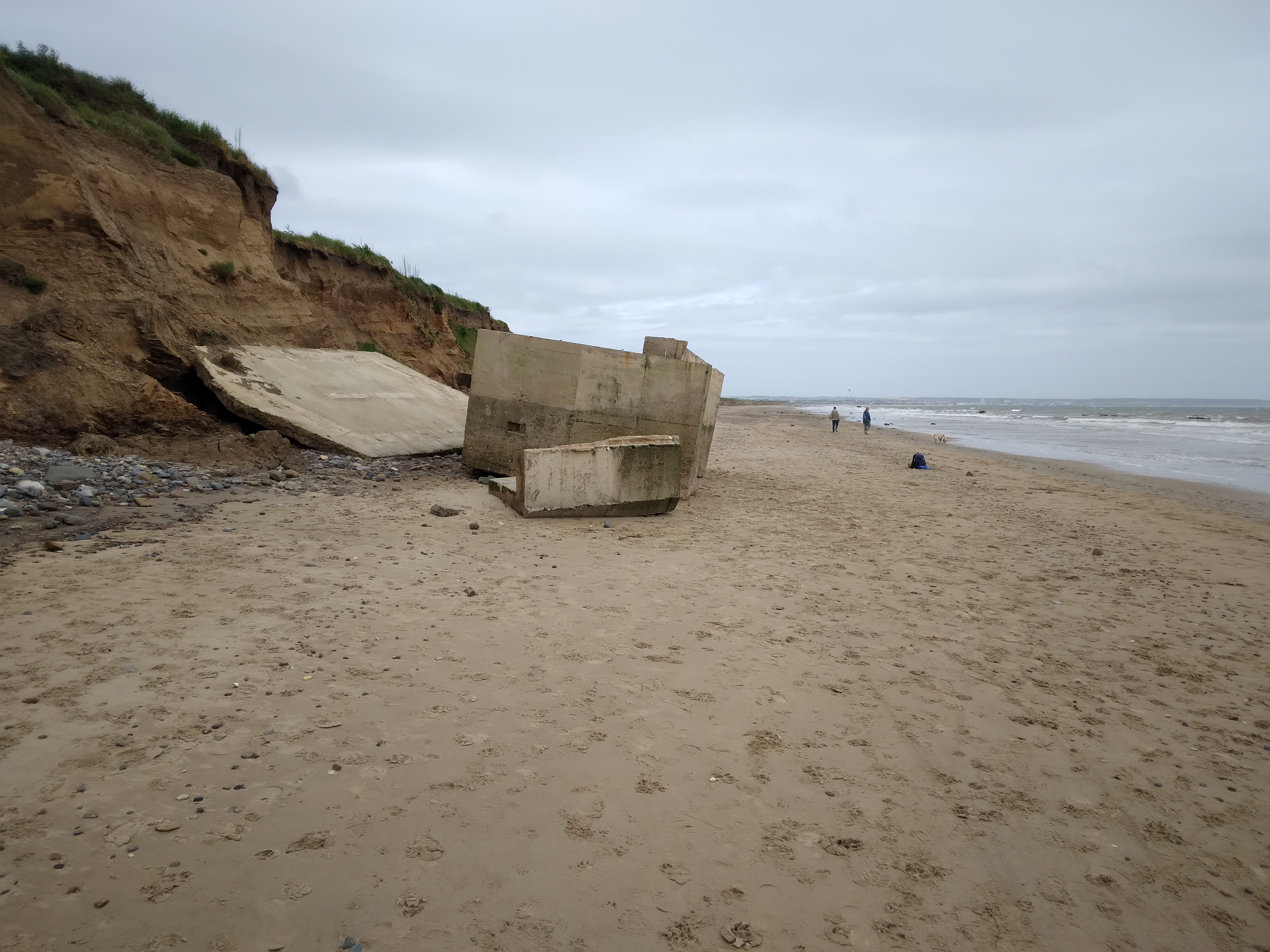
The effect of coastal erosion on a Second World War-era pillbox near Barmston in 2023

The Holderness coastline suffers the highest rate of coastal erosion in Europe: 2 metres (6 ft 7 in) a year on average or 2 million tonnes of material a year. Some of this is transported by longshore drift with about 3% of material being deposited at Spurn Head spit, to the south. The coastline has retreated noticeably in the last 2,000 years, with many former settlements now flooded, particularly Ravenser Odd and Ravenspurn, which was a major port until its destruction in the 14th century. Erosion is an ongoing concern in the area. The East Riding of Yorkshire Council has been carrying out cliff erosion defences between Sewerby and Kilnsea since 1951. The Holderness area drains mostly into the Humber and the eponymous River Hull drains the area north of Hull.

The western part of the district in the Vale of York borders on and is drained by the River Derwent. The landscape is generally low-lying and flat although minor ridges and glacial moraines provide some variations in topography. Where there are dry sandy soils there are remnants of historic heathlands and ancient semi-natural woodlands. Arable fields dominate the land cover of the area and grasslands are infrequent. There are very few flood meadows left, although some significant areas remain on the lower reaches of the River Derwent.

=== Climate ===
The East Riding generally has cool summers and relatively mild winters. Weather conditions vary from day to day as well as from season to season. The latitude of the area means that it is influenced by predominantly westerly winds with depressions and their associated fronts, bringing with them unsettled and windy weather, particularly in winter. Between depressions there are often small mobile anticyclones that bring periods of fair weather. In winter, anticyclones bring cold dry weather. In summer the anticyclones tend to bring dry settled conditions which can lead to drought, particularly on the Wolds. For its latitude this area is mild in winter and cooler in summer due to the influence of the Gulf Stream in the northern Atlantic Ocean. Air temperature varies on a daily and seasonal basis. The temperature is usually lower at night, and January is the coldest time of the year. The two dominant influences on the climate of the area are the shelter against the worst of the moist westerly winds provided by the Pennines and the proximity of the North Sea.

Climate data for Kingston upon Hull: Average maximum and minimum temperatures, and average rainfall recorded between 1991 and 2020 by the Met Office.
Month	Jan	Feb	Mar	Apr	May	Jun	Jul	Aug	Sep	Oct	Nov	Dec	Year
Mean daily maximum °C (°F)	7.7 (45.9)	8.5 (47.3)	10.8 (51.4)	13.6 (56.5)	16.6 (61.9)	19.5 (67.1)	22.0 (71.6)	21.8 (71.2)	18.9 (66.0)	14.7 (58.5)	10.6 (51.1)	7.9 (46.2)	14.4 (57.9)
Mean daily minimum °C (°F)	2.1 (35.8)	2.2 (36.0)	3.4 (38.1)	5.1 (41.2)	7.7 (45.9)	10.5 (50.9)	12.7 (54.9)	12.5 (54.5)	10.5 (50.9)	7.8 (46.0)	4.6 (40.3)	2.4 (36.3)	6.85 (44.33)
Average precipitation mm (inches)	54.3 (2.14)	47.6 (1.87)	43.3 (1.70)	47.5 (1.87)	48.3 (1.90)	69.7 (2.74)	61.3 (2.41)	64.6 (2.54)	61.3 (2.41)	66.4 (2.61)	68.2 (2.69)	60.4 (2.38)	693.4 (27.30)
Average precipitation days (≥ 1.0 mm)	11.7	10.4	9.8	9.5	9.3	9.8	9.7	10.1	9.1	11.2	12.6	11.7	124.8
Mean monthly sunshine hours	55.4	79.0	117.6	159.1	200.1	189.3	197.0	183.2	147.3	109.2	65.7	55.3	1,558.7
Source: Met Office

== Governance ==
The East Riding of Yorkshire is divided into two council areas: Kingston upon Hull is managed by Hull City Council, and the rest of the county is managed by the East Riding of Yorkshire Council.

A non-mayoral devolution deal was previously proposed for the county, a mayoral deal received approval from the Secretary of State as of September 2024. This led to the establishment of an Hull and East Yorkshire Combined Authority with powers over housing, job creation and public transport, including bus franchising.

=== Administrative history ===
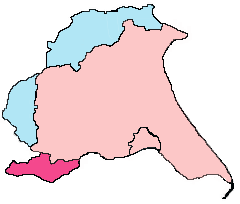
East Riding of Yorkshire boundaries – historic riding (light pink and blue), ceremonial county (light pink and darker pink)

The administrative division of the East Riding of Yorkshire originated in antiquity. Unlike most counties in Great Britain, which were divided anciently into hundreds, Yorkshire was divided first into three ridings and then into numerous wapentakes within each riding. The separate Lieutenancy for the riding was established after the Restoration, and the ridings each had separate Quarter Sessions. For statistical purposes in the 19th century an East Riding of Yorkshire registration county was designated, consisting of the entirety of the Poor Law Unions of Beverley, Bridlington, Driffield, Howden, Hull, Patrington, Pocklington, Sculcoates, Skirlaugh and York.

In 1889 under the Local Government Act 1888, administrative counties were formed on the existing historic county boundaries in England, but in Yorkshire, given the vast size of the county area, three administrative county councils were created, based on the historic boundaries of the three Ridings. A county council for the East Riding of Yorkshire (the East Riding County Council) was set up in 1889, covering an administrative county local government area centred on Beverley and which had the same boundaries as the historic riding. It also acted as the ceremonial county (Lieutenancy) area established for the area. At the same date a separate county borough of Kingston upon Hull, was created. The East Riding County Council and the county borough of Kingston upon Hull remained in place for 86 years until being removed for new administrative tiers of local government.

In 1974 under the Local Government Act 1972, the historic established Lieutenancy and the local government administrative county were disbanded, being replaced by the newly created Humberside County Council which included most of the East Riding and additional parts of the West Riding and parts of Lincolnshire. The creation of this cross-Humber authority was unpopular on both banks of the Humber. Due to this local unpopularity with the new county council name, two of the nine districts formed in the 1972 Act included East Yorkshire in their titles, though they only covered a fraction of the geographical East Yorkshire area (East Yorkshire district, East Yorkshire Borough of Beverley). Continued disquiet culminated in a number of local government reviews in the 1980s and 1990s. Humberside County Council was abolished on 1 April 1996, after 22 years of existence. The area north of the Humber Estuary (i.e. the city of Hull, whose boundaries would remain unchanged, the former districts of East Yorkshire, Beverley, and Holderness, and the northern part of the former Boothferry district, including the Goole area) formed two unitary authorities. The East Riding of Yorkshire Council unitary authority and the Kingston upon Hull City Council unitary authority were formed on 1 April 1996. The ceremonial county, the area in which the Lord Lieutenant of the East Riding of Yorkshire represents the Crown, was re-established the same day, covering the City of Kingston upon Hull as well as the East Riding of Yorkshire Council area as did predecessor authorities.

The East Riding of Yorkshire is entirely parished; the City of Hull has no parishes. From 1996 Beverley had Charter Trustees to maintain the charter of the borough of Beverley: these were replaced by a Beverley Town Council in 1999, and Bridlington was parished in 1999. The unparished area consisting of the urban district of Haltemprice was divided into various parishes in 1999 and 2000.

=== Current administration ===
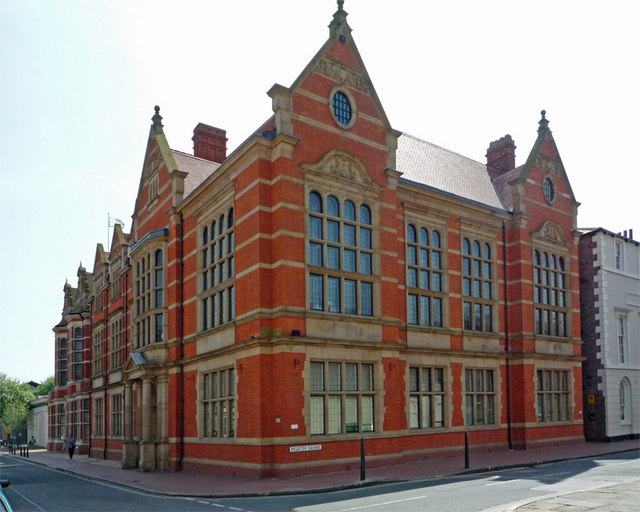
County Hall, Beverley, the headquarters of the council

The East Riding of Yorkshire Council is based at County Hall in Beverley, in the former headquarters of Humberside County Council, and the former headquarters of East Riding County Council before that. There are 26 wards electing a total of 67 councillors in the district. The council elects on a four-yearly cycle with all seats up for election at the same time. It first had elections in 1995—a year before it came into its powers—as a shadow authority. Between 1995 and 2007 the council had No overall control. In the 2007 local elections the Conservative Party gained a majority of seats, including those of the Liberal Democrat and Labour Party leaders. The council has a leader-and-executive system, led by Steven Parnaby of the Conservative Party since its creation until his retirement at the 2019 election, when Richard Burton was elected as his replacement. On 13 May 2021, Jonathan Owen was elected as the new leader of the council. Following the 2023 election the Conservative Party elected former deputy, Anne Handley, to be leader of the group. At the annual general meeting of the council on 18 May 2023 Handley was elected as leader of the council, with the Conservative Party running a minority administration with support of the independents.

In the Audit Commission report covering 2007 the council was given a four-star rating, which places the authority as one of the best in the country.

=== Result of the 2023 election ===
2023 East Riding of Yorkshire Council election
Party	Candidates	Seats	Gains	Losses	Net gain/loss	Seats %	Votes %	Votes	+/−
Conservative	60	29	0	20	▼20	43.2	35.7	69,544	-8.7%
Liberal Democrats	65	22	14	0	▲14	32.8	29.6	57,637	+13.9%
Labour	59	4	4	0	▲4	6.0	21.2	41,282	+2.9%
Independent	17	9	1	0	▲1	13.4	8.2	15,907	-5.0%
Yorkshire	6	3	1	0	▲1	4.5	2.1	4,126	-0.4%
Green	9	0	0	0	Steady	0.0	2.0	3,868	-1.6%
Reform	3	0	0	0	Steady	0.0	0.7	1,259	New
SDP	3	0	0	0	Steady	0.0	0.2	398	New
TUSC	2	0	0	0	Steady	0.0	0.1	276	New
ADF	1	0	0	0	Steady	0.0	0.1	182	New
Freedom Alliance (UK)	1	0	0	0	Steady	0.0	0.1	98	New

=== Westminster parliamentary ===
For representation in the Parliament of the United Kingdom the bulk of the East Riding district is divided into three county constituencies: Beverley and Holderness, Bridlington and the Wolds and Goole and Pocklington. The Kingston upon Hull area is divided into three constituencies; Kingston upon Hull North and Cottingham, Kingston upon Hull East, and Kingston upon Hull West and Haltemprice.

== Demographics ==
East Riding of Yorkshire population pyramid

Religion in the East Riding 2021
UK Census 2021	E Riding	Yorkshire and the Humber	England
Christian	53.3%	44.9%	46.3%
No religion	39.1%	39.4%	36.7%
Muslim	0.6%	8.1%	6.7%
Buddhist	0.3%	0.3%	0.5%
Hindu	0.2%	0.5%	1.8%
Jewish	0.1%	0.2%	0.5%
Sikh	0.1%	0.4%	0.9%
Other religions	0.4%	0.4%	0.6%
Religion not stated	6.0%	5.7%	6.0%

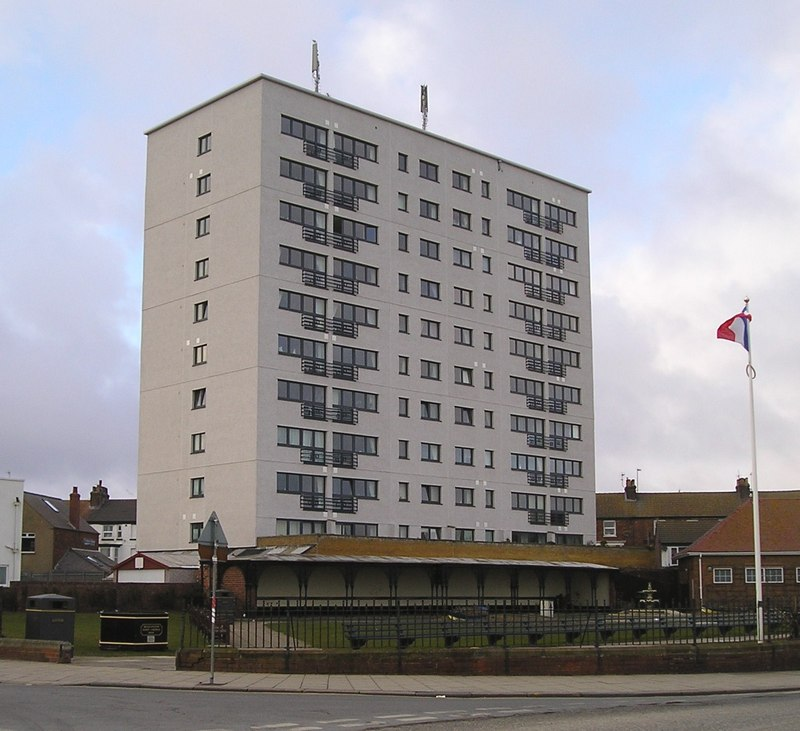
Apartment block in Bridlington

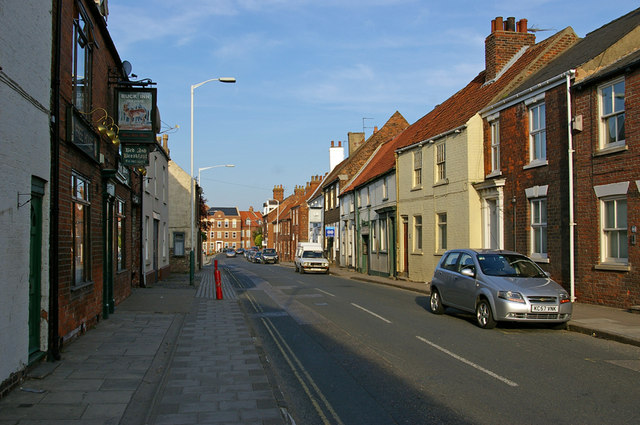
Terraced housing in Beverley

Until 1 April 2009, the East Riding was the largest district and the largest unitary authority in England by area and the second-largest non-metropolitan district in England by population. Following the 2009 structural changes to local government in England it fell to fifth place by area and sixth place by population. The East Riding of Yorkshire covers 240,768 hectares (930 mi^{2}) and has a population of 335,049 (2008 Office for National Statistics mid-year estimates), a density of 1.4 people per hectare. The most populous parishes in the main 2001 census were Bridlington (34,000), Goole (17,000), Beverley (17,000), Cottingham (17,000, by Hull), Hessle (15,000, by Hull), Driffield (11,000), Anlaby with Anlaby Common (10,000, by Hull), Hornsea (8,000) and Willerby (8,000), Pocklington (8,000) and Elloughton-cum-Brough (7,000). Half the district's population reside in these 11 parishes, with the other half living in the other 160 parishes. In comparison, Hull's population according to the same census was 243,589. The population density of the district was around 135 people per square km, which made it the least densely populated unitary authority after the Isles of Scilly, Rutland and Herefordshire.

The East Riding has a larger than average number of residents aged 40 and above. There is a particularly strong deficit in the number of young adults. There is a higher-than-average level of car ownership. 36.4% of all households do not have a car. Less than 5% of the population travel to work by public transport compared with 15% nationally. The district is one of the lowest non-white populations, with the census reporting 98.8% of the inhabitants being white. Hull itself is also quite monoethnic for a city of its size, with the census reporting 97.7% white.

Areas of the East Riding show significant signs of affluence, including the Parliamentary constituency of Haltemprice and Howden which consists of middle-class areas such as: the suburb of Willerby, suburb of Kirk Ella, village of North Ferriby, and village of Swanland. Much of the area is affluent and has one of the highest proportions of owner-occupiers in the country.

Other parts of the county are more diverse, including the suburbs of Hessle, Cottingham and Anlaby with Anlaby Common. These areas consist of a mix of housing tenures in a real range of properties, from small ex-authority estates, to grand period homes. Hessle and Cottingham in particular have seen a considerable amount of home building, supporting the regeneration and development of the city of Hull. Beverley, a market town, is generally associated with affluence but, like any other town of its size, it also has areas that face disadvantage.

Other areas of the East Riding of Yorkshire face significant deprivation. The seaside towns of Withernsea and Bridlington face similar challenges with unemployment, low educational attainment, and socioeconomic inequality. South East Holderness, consisting of small rural communities, deals with limited access to services, inadequate public transportation, and the decline of traditional industries. Goole, an inland port town, has experienced a decline in its socioeconomic characteristic. Akin to much of the West Riding, this has coincided with the decline of industry over the latter half of the 20th century.

The crime rate in the East Riding is lower than the national average in robbery, sexual offences, theft of a vehicle, theft from a vehicle, violence against a person and burglary.

Christianity is the religion with the largest following in the area, with 53.3% residents so identifying in the 2021 UK census. These census figures show no other single religion returned affiliation, as a percentage of population, above the national average for England. At the time of the 2021 census the population of the East Riding was 342,215 and its ethnic composition was 97.4% white, compared with the English average of 81.0%. The area has a slightly higher elderly population, of 26.4% in 2021, than the national average.

== Settlements ==
Bold are cities, are administrative headquarters

By population, the largest settlements in the ceremonial county are:

- Kingston upon Hull (257,100)
- Bridlington (35,369)
- Beverley (30,351)
- Goole (19,518)
- Cottingham (17,164)
- Hessle (15,000)
- Driffield (13,080)
- Elloughton-cum-Brough (10,075)
- Anlaby (9,794)
- Hornsea (8,432)
- Pocklington (8,161)
- Willerby (7,940)
- Woodmansey (7,109)
- Hedon (7,100)
- Molescroft (6,820)
- Market Weighton (6,429)
- Withernsea (6,159)
- Kirk Ella (5,576)
- Howden (4,142)

East Riding of Yorkshire settlements

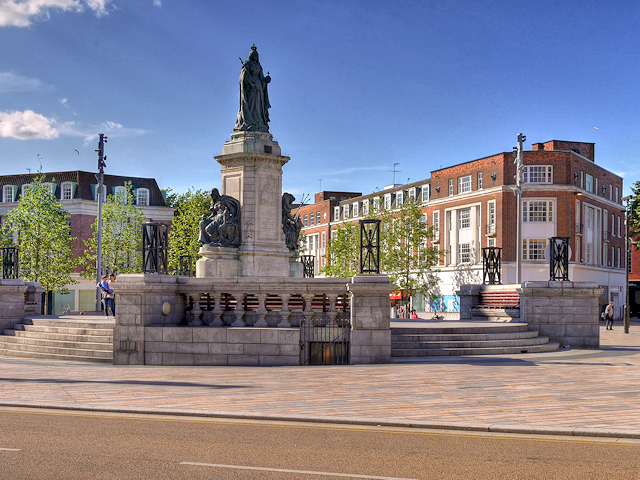
Hull

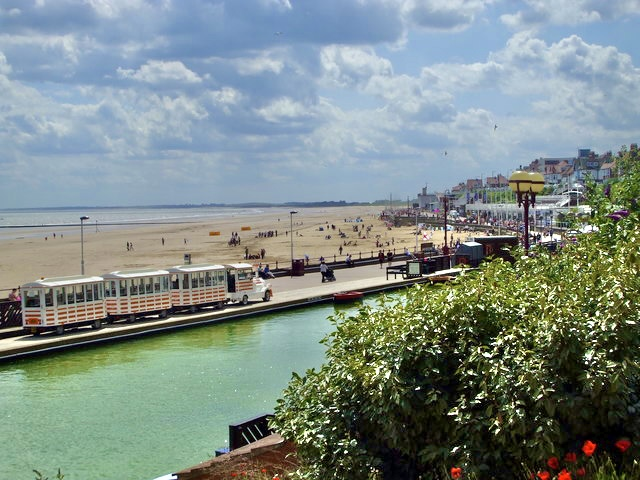
Bridlington

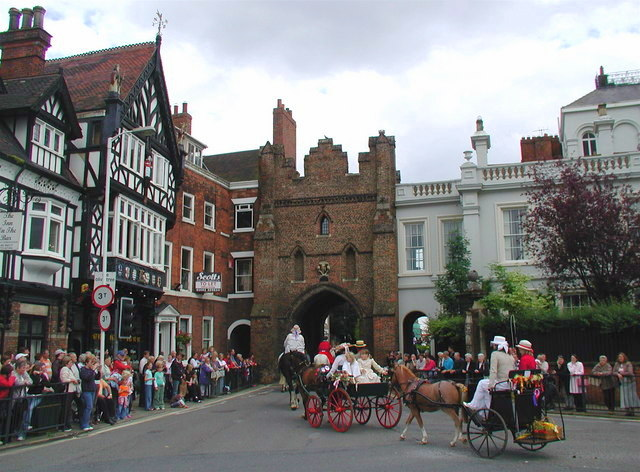
Beverley

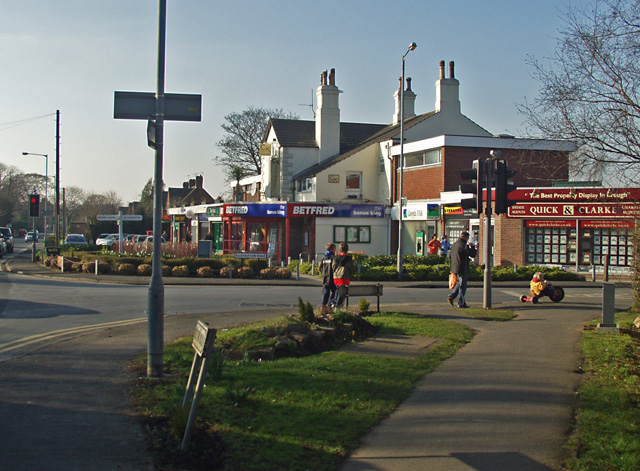
Elloughton-cum-Brough

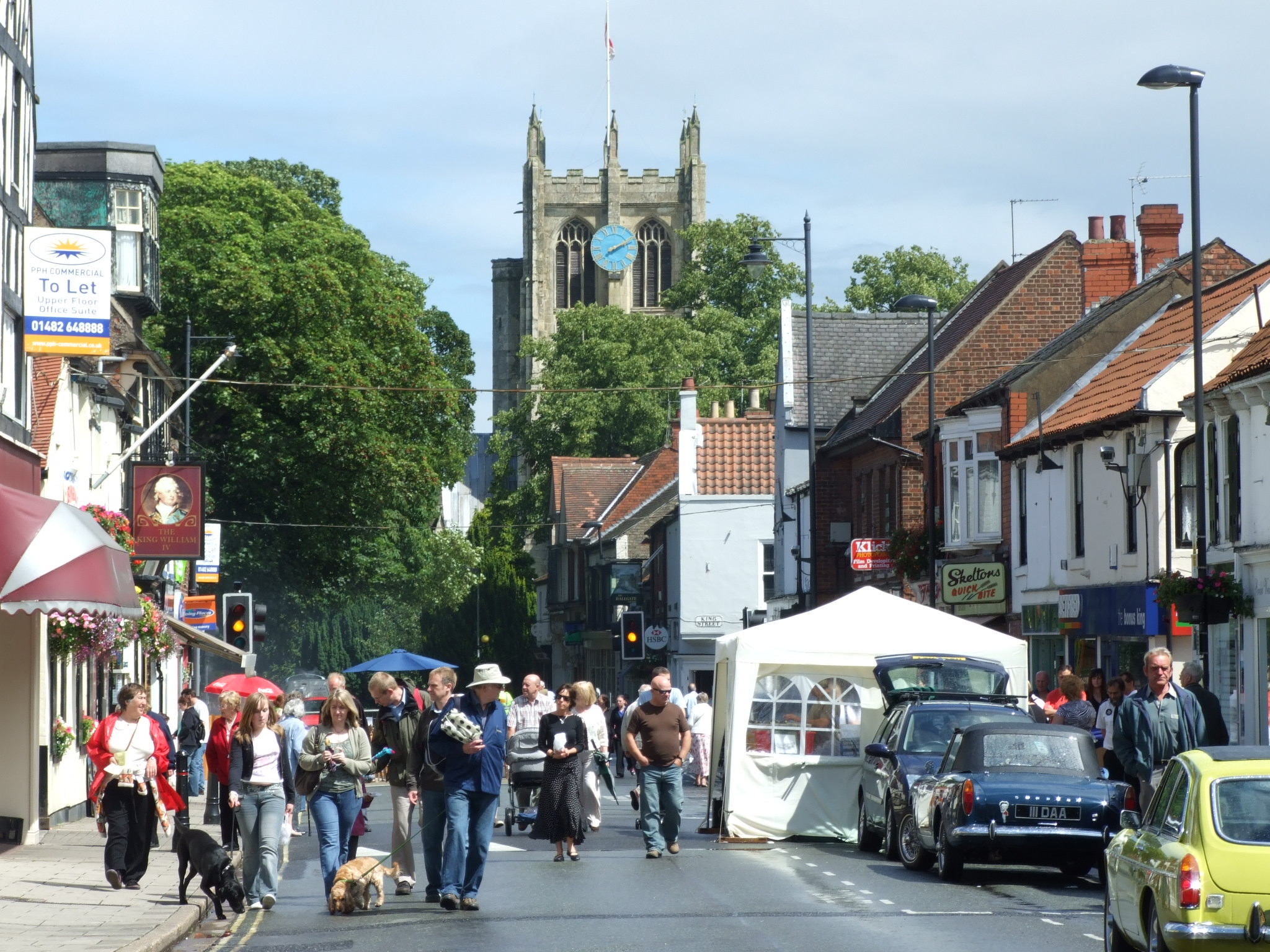
Cottingham

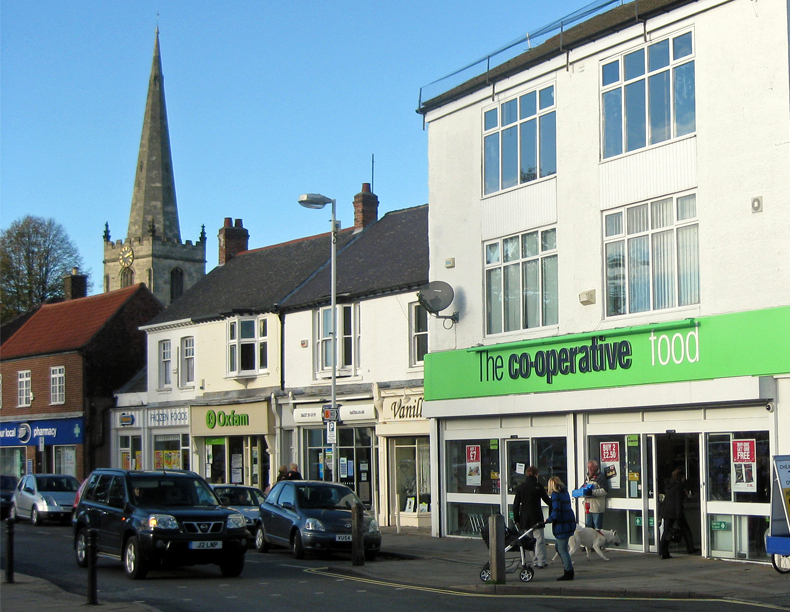
Hessle

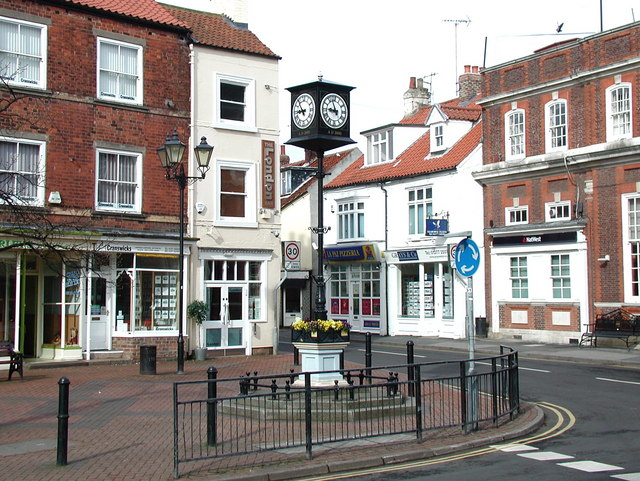
Driffield

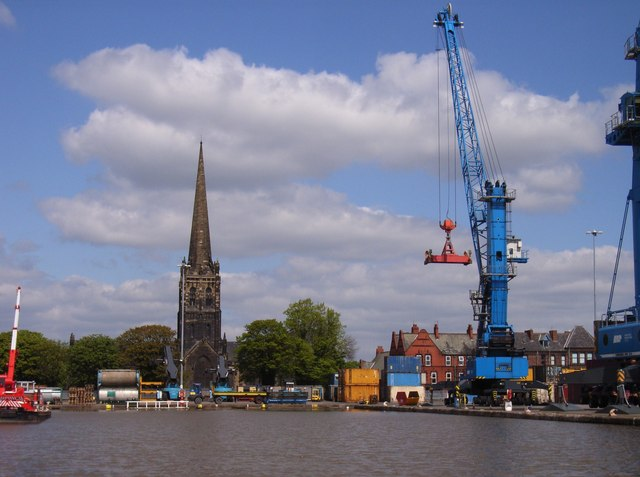
Goole

Kingston upon Hull is administered separately from the East Riding of Yorkshire. Anlaby and Willerby are suburban villages, almost contiguous with the Hull urban area. Bridlington is the most populous of the coastal settlements; others include Flamborough, Hornsea, Withernsea and Aldbrough. Settlements on the flat agricultural area of Holderness are Hedon and Roos and in the Great Wold Valley is Rudston. Beverley, Bishop Burton, Driffield, Cottingham and Lockington lie is the Yorkshire Wolds eastern foot. Low-lying lands close to the Humber Estuary are Goole, Brough, North Ferriby, Hessle and Kirk Ella. Stamford Bridge, Pocklington, Market Weighton, Holme-on-Spalding-Moor, Howden and South Cave all lie to the north and west of the area, between the River Derwent and the scarp slope of the Wolds.

== Places of interest ==
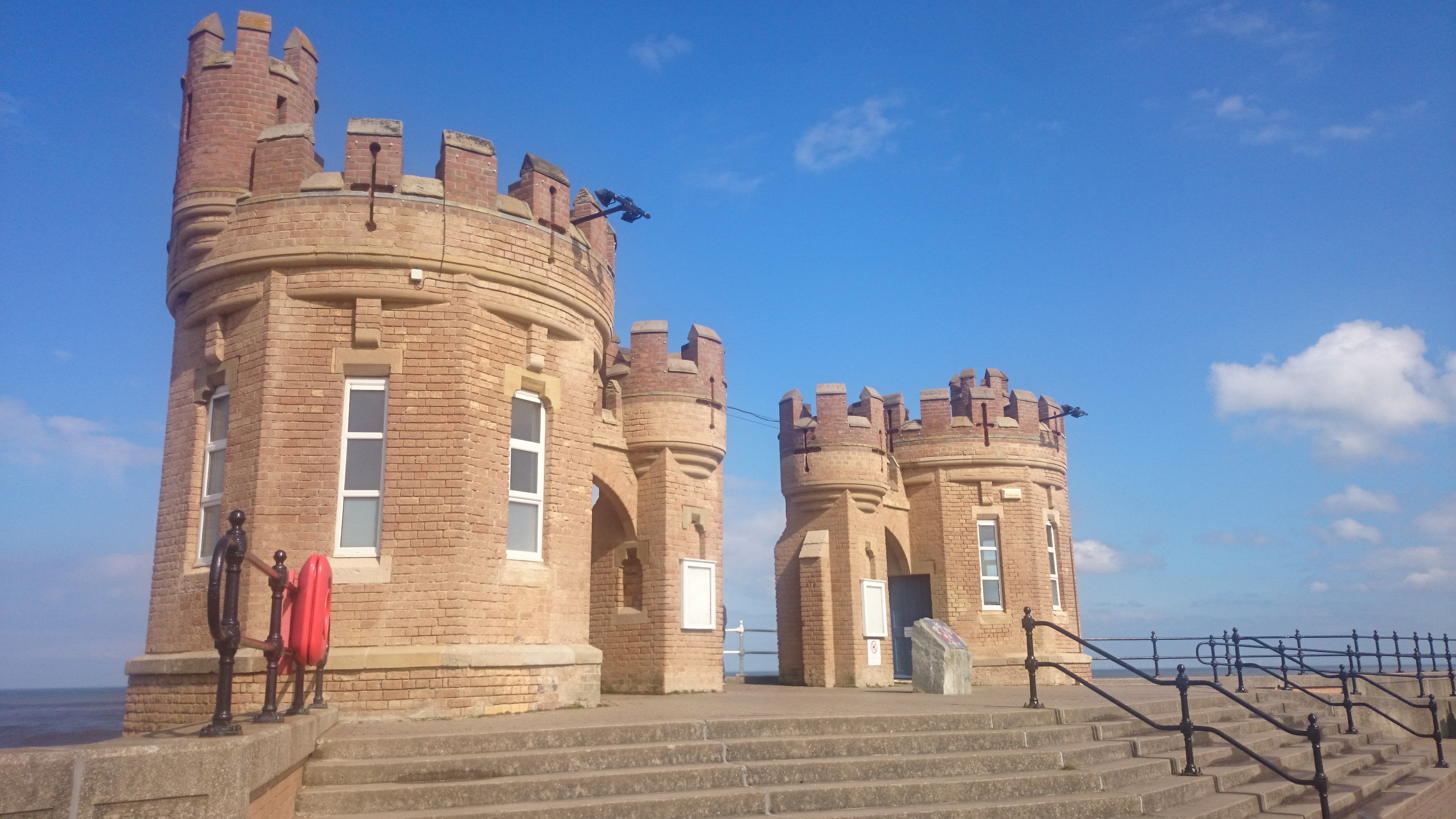
Withernsea Pier Towers

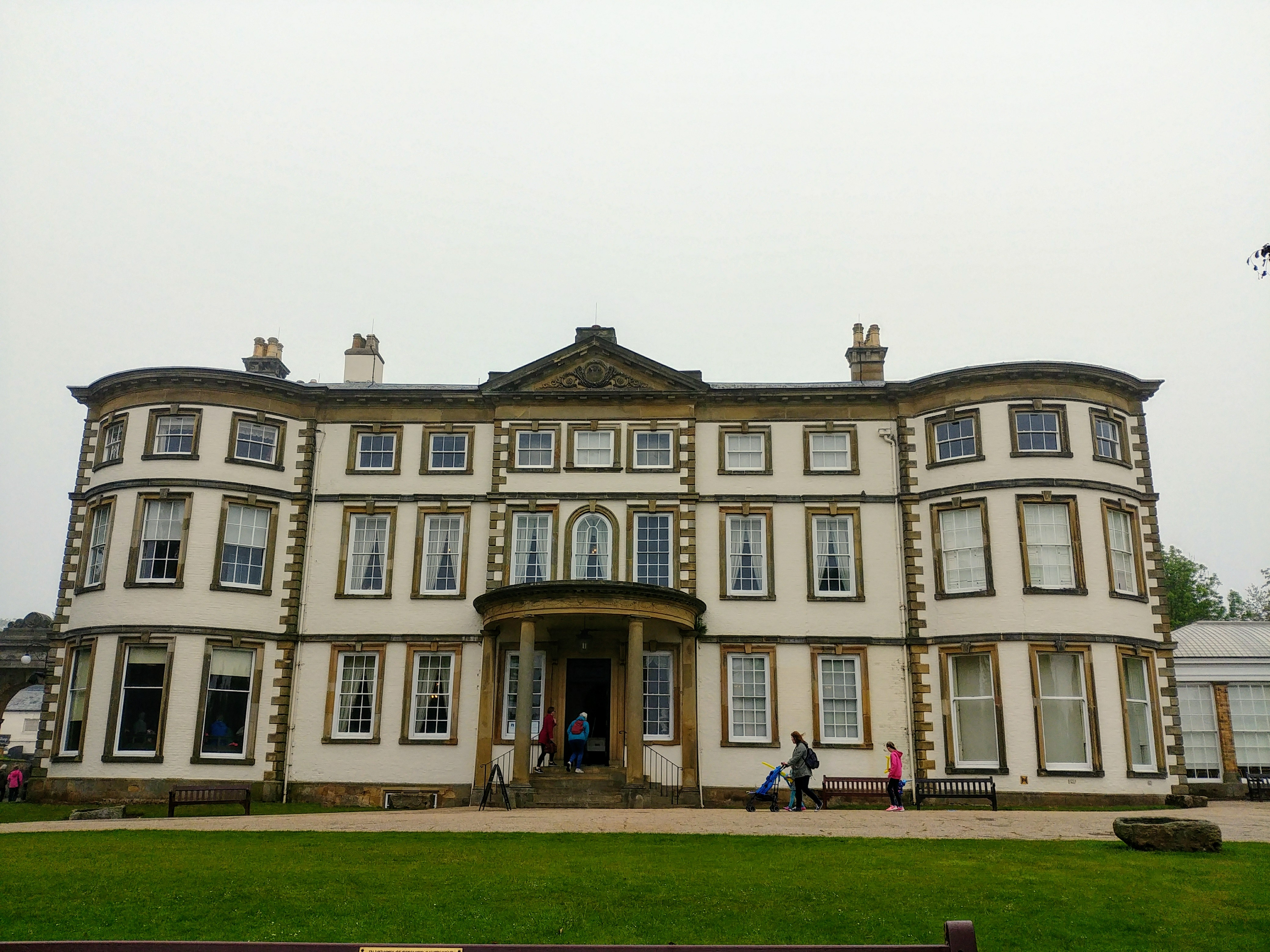
Sewerby Hall

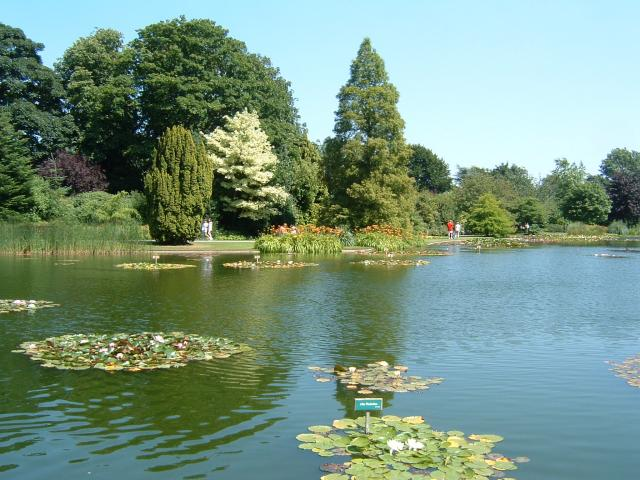
Burnby Hall Gardens

There are a wide range of interesting places to visit in the East Riding. These include historic buildings such as Burnby Hall, Burton Agnes Manor House, Burton Agnes Hall, Sewerby Hall, Skipsea Castle and the gun battery of Fort Paull. The religious edifices of the Rudston Monolith, Beverley Minster, Beverley Friary and Howden Minster can be visited at all seasons.

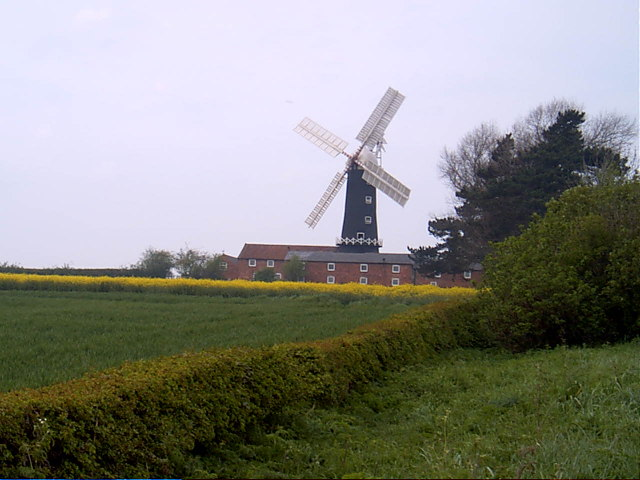
Skidby Windmill is surrounded by fertile agricultural land typical of the East Riding.

The sails of Skidby Windmill can be seen providing the power to grind flour on certain days, and natural sites provide interest at Spurn, Bempton Cliffs, Hornsea Mere, Humber Estuary, River Hull, Watton Beck, River Derwent, River Ouse, River Aire, River Trent and River Don, some of which are owned or run by the Yorkshire Wildlife Trust.

The Driffield Navigation, Leven Canal, Market Weighton Canal and Pocklington Canal offer glimpses of tranquillity. Stamford Bridge is the site of the famous battle, and the Yorkshire Wolds Way is a long-distance footpath that takes a winding route through the Yorkshire Wolds to Filey.

=== Religious sites ===
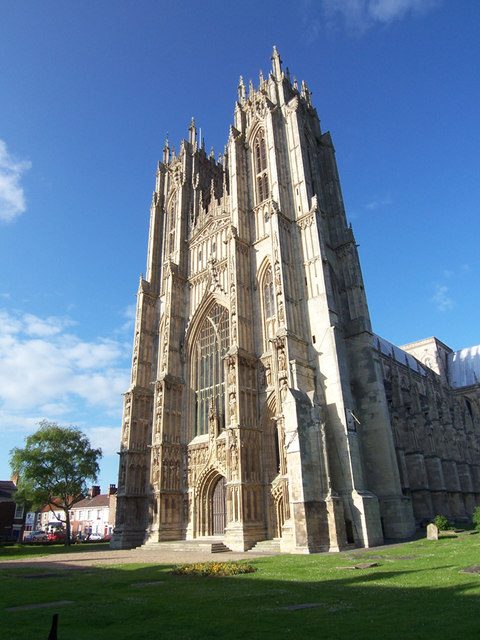
Beverley's 11th-century minster is one of the county's most visited sites.

Most of the East Riding is in the East Riding Archdeaconry of the Church of England Diocese of York. The archdeaconry includes the Yorkshire Wolds and the City of Hull, with a coastline extending from Scarborough and Bridlington in the north to Spurn Point. The Middlesbrough Roman Catholic diocese covers Yorkshire's historic east and north ridings as well as the historic City of York.

Notable religious sites include Beverley Minster, Howden Minster, Hull Minster and Bridlington Priory along with the historic parish church of St Augustine, Hedon, known as the 'King of Holderness', which is a Grade I listed building. The Sykes Churches Trail is a tour of East Yorkshire churches which were built, rebuilt or restored by the Sykes family of Sledmere House in the 19th century.

== Transport ==
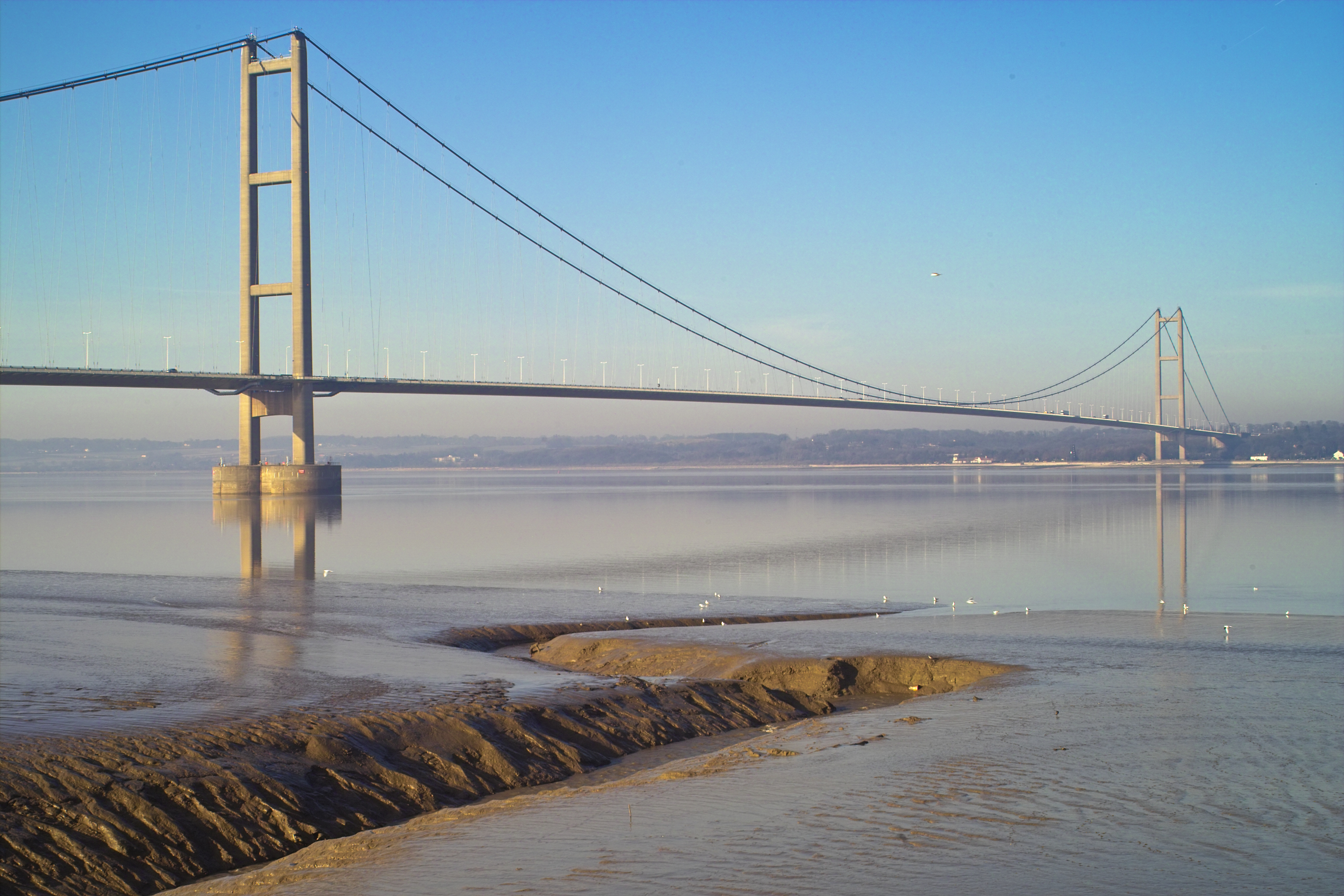
The Humber Bridge connects the East Riding with North Lincolnshire.

The East Riding has only a small segment of motorway. Part of the M62 serves to link the Hull area to West Yorkshire and the national motorway network, while the M18 incidentally passes the district border near Goole. Primary roads in the district include the A63, A164, A165, A1034, A166, A1033 and the A1079.

Hull Paragon Interchange is a large railway station, served by the Selby Line to the west and the Yorkshire Coast Line to the north. See Railway stations in the East Riding of Yorkshire.

Train operators active in the area are Hull Trains, London North Eastern Railway, Northern and TransPennine Express. Bus services are provided by several operators including First York, which provides services from the East Riding into York, Goole Town Service and also services from Goole to Doncaster. Stagecoach in Hull provides services from the East Riding to Hull and into Lincolnshire, and East Yorkshire Motor Services, historically the dominant area operator, provides a wide variety of bus services throughout the East Riding. Yorkshire Coastliner provides services from Bridlington to Malton, York and Leeds. Holderness Area Rural Transport, a charity, provides a community transport service for North Holderness, taking people to medical appointments in Hull and to the shops.

The Humber Bridge, a road-only bridge, part of the A15, links Hessle, west of Hull, with Barton-upon-Humber in Lincolnshire. West of this, the next crossing of the river (the Ouse at this point) are three bridges near Goole: a railway bridge, the M62 bridge and the A614.

The area is served by Humberside Airport located in Lincolnshire.

== Economy ==
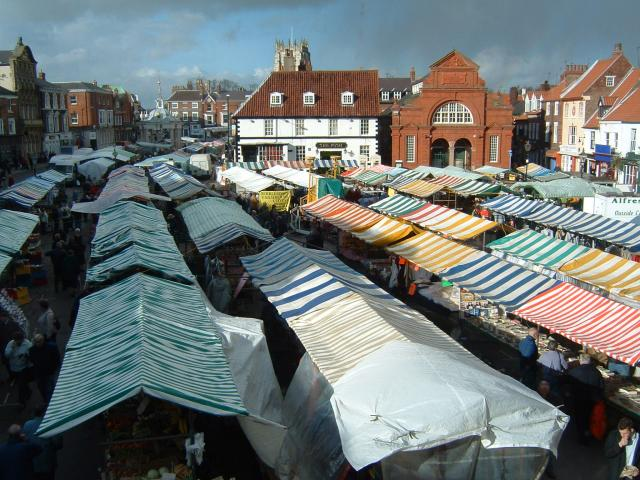
Beverley on market day

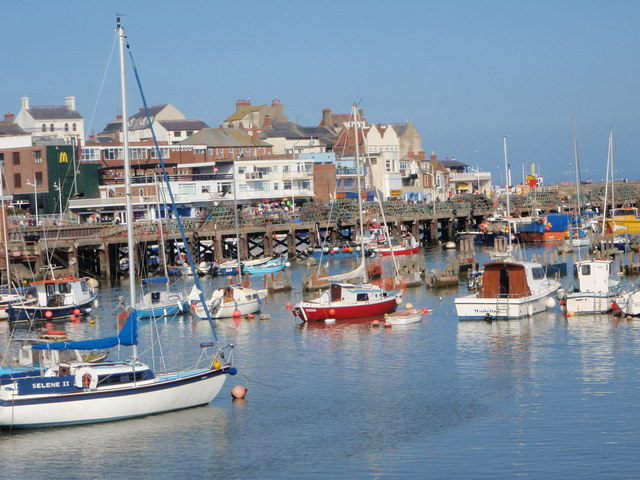
Bridlington Harbour

The district is generally rural, with no towns approaching the size of Hull. There are a few market towns such as Beverley, Driffield, Goole, Market Weighton and Pocklington, and the coastal towns of Bridlington, Hornsea and Withernsea. In the south the district contains areas such as Hessle which are part of the Hull urban area but outside the city boundaries. Rural areas tend to have a greater business stock than urban areas, reflecting the number of agricultural businesses and small businesses in rural areas. 20% of all VAT registered businesses in the East Riding are in agriculture and related sectors, although the number of such businesses fell by 40% between 1997 and 2003. Easington, on the coast, is the site of a natural gas terminal, Easington Gas Terminal, used for the Langeled pipeline, as well as three other gas terminals operated by BP and Centrica.

This is a chart of trend of regional gross value added of East Riding of Yorkshire at current basic prices with figures in millions of British pounds sterling.

Year	Regional Gross Value Added^{[a]}	Agriculture^{[b]}	Industry^{[c]}	Services^{[d]}
1995	2,708	299	896	1,513
2000	3,006	209	1,090	1,707
2003	3,783	233	1,106	2,444

^{a} Components may not sum to totals due to rounding
^{b} includes hunting and forestry
^{c} includes energy and construction
^{d} includes financial intermediation services indirectly measured

The East Riding is characterised by a high employment rate and a relatively low unemployment level. The overall unemployment rate is 4.3%, which is 1.2 percentage points lower than the national average. However, there are unemployment hotspots in Bridlington, Goole and Withernsea. Unemployment levels tend to fluctuate over the course of the year with lower levels during the summer months due to increased employment in the tourism and food production sectors. A major year-round employer in the East Riding is the Defence School of Transport at DST Leconfield, which trains 14,000 personnel from the Army, the Royal Air Force and the Royal Marines each year and provides more than 1,000 civilian jobs.

The East Riding of Yorkshire Council has joined Hull City Council, North East Lincolnshire and North Lincolnshire Councils in the Hull and Humber Ports City Region Partnership.

=== Renewable energy ===
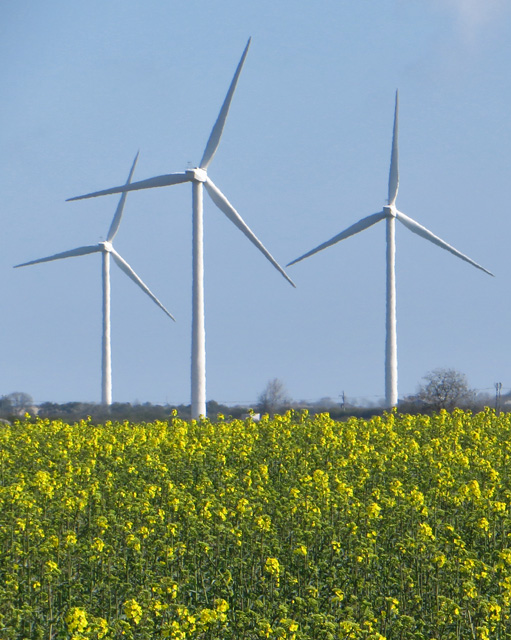
Wind farm in High Fosham

The UK government has set a target to generate 10% of the UK's electricity from renewable energy sources by 2010. The Energy White Paper (2003) sets out the Government's aspiration to double that figure to 20% by 2020. It has additionally signed up to the legally binding Kyoto Protocol, which requires a reduction of greenhouse gas emissions by 12.5% of 1990 levels by 2008–12 and a reduction of CO_{2} emissions by 20% of 1990 levels by 2010. Regional and local authorities are required to contribute to the delivery of these national targets. The East Riding has an above-average potential to generate renewable electricity for Local Authorities in the region due its large wind energy potential. The East Riding of Yorkshire is set a target of 41 MW by 2010, and a target for 2021 of 148 MW for installed grid-connected renewable energy. There are operational wind farms at Lissett in Holderness and Out Newton to the north of the Humber Estuary.

There are single turbines at the Waste Water Treatment Works at Saltend and at Loftsome Bridge Water Treatment Works near Barmby on the Marsh. In addition, several other wind developments have either been given or are applying for permission. By late February 2009 there was existing developed capacity or planning approval for 140 MW of renewable energy from wind farm developments. The overall renewable energy target for 2010 and 2021 has therefore already been exceeded by wind energy proposals alone, assuming some of these schemes will be operational by 2010. The East Riding has also exceeded 148 MW, when other renewable energy types such as biomass are included in the calculation. The Humber Estuary is to be used for trials of a tidal stream generator. If successful, it will be used to develop larger models which could be deployed in a 100-unit "renewable power station" capable of powering 70,000 homes.

=== Industry ===
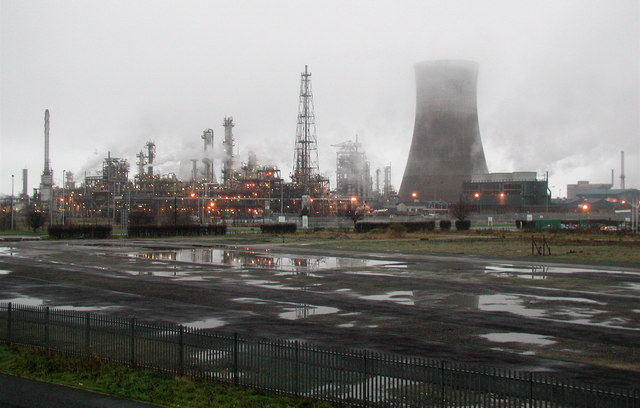
BP Chemical Plant, Salt End

The 18th century saw a canal network form, the River Derwent was canalised as far upstream as Malton and was linked to Pocklington by the cutting of the Pocklington Canal. Other canals were cut to join the towns of Beverley and Driffield to the River Hull, which was also improved to aid navigation. The Market Weighton Canal connected the town directly to the Humber Estuary. The canals and canalisation of the county's rivers helped aid drainage to low-lying and ill-drained areas.

The 19th century saw a rail network created. An early rail link was constructed between Filey and Bridlington in 1847 and the Malton to Driffield railway was the first to cross the Wolds in 1853. Holidaymakers on the rail network expanded the coastal resorts of Bridlington, Hornsea and Withernsea. These routes also served the agricultural community in helping to get products to the expanding industrial markets to the port of Hull for export and the West Riding of Yorkshire for further production. The landscape in the East Riding has changed little since the enclosure of the open fields in the 18th and 19th centuries, except for some hedgerows removed to allow for the use of large agricultural machinery in the 20th century.

== Education ==
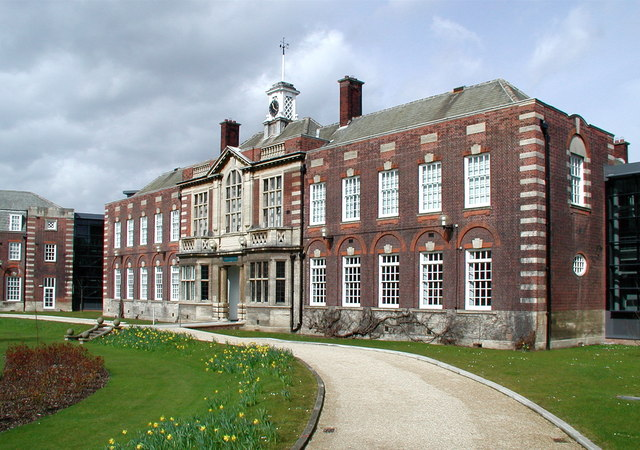
The Derwent Building at the University of Hull

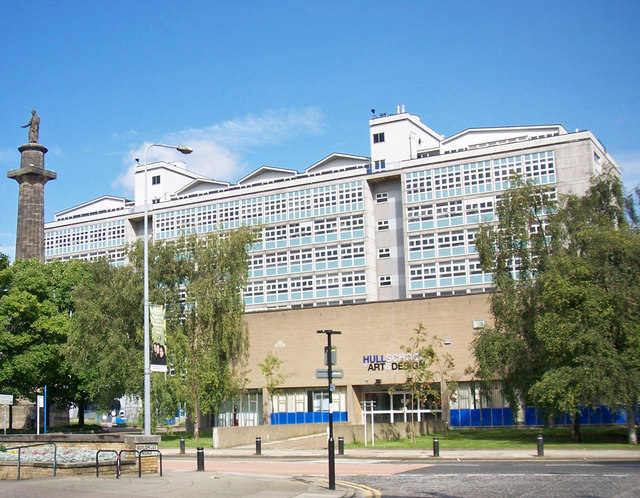
Hull College

The East Riding local education authority supports 150 schools: 131 primary schools and 19 secondary schools. The total net spending per head of population on education rose from £578.08 in 2006–07 to £632.88 in 2007–08. In 2009 primary school test results showed a slide down the national performance table for the East Riding authority, dropping eight places in the national league table to 28th after other education authorities improved more in the tests.

At secondary level the authority slipped seven places to 39th out of 149 authorities, despite producing the best set of General Certificate of Secondary Education (GCSE) results since the inception of the East Riding of Yorkshire Council in 1996. The percentage of students achieving five or more good GCSEs, at grades A*–C including maths and English, rose to 52.5 per cent, from 50.8 per cent in 2007. This is above the national average of 47.6 per cent. Bishop Burton is the location of Bishop Burton College, a further education and higher education college specialising in agriculture and equine studies. Beverley Grammar School, which was founded around 700 AD, is widely renowned for being the oldest continuously operating state school in England.

Furthermore, Hull is home to several schools, including the private Hymers College, and a university. The University of Hull was founded as a university college in 1927 and received full university status in 1954; it is home to the Hull York Medical School, and has seen large scale expansion in recent years to cater for the ever-growing number of students.

== Public services ==
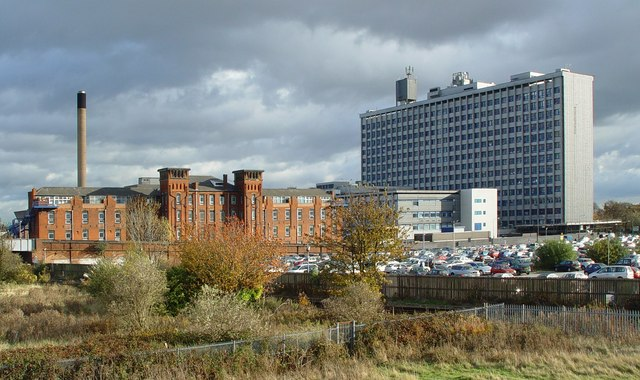
Hull Royal Infirmary

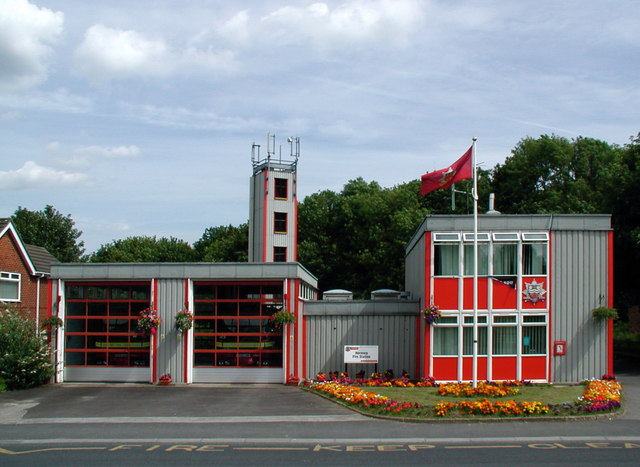
Hornsea fire station

Both the East Riding and Hull are still covered by the Humberside Police area and the Humberside Fire and Rescue Service. Piped water is supplied by Yorkshire Water who also maintain the sewerage system. About 1% of the population use water from private supplies. They are usually in the more remote parts of the East Riding. The majority are bore holes but they can be wells or natural springs. NHS East Riding of Yorkshire provides health services such as district nursing, health visiting, school nursing, intermediate care and therapy services. It works with local GP practices, pharmacists, dentists, optometrists and ambulance services to provide a primary healthcare service. Hull and East Yorkshire Hospitals NHS Trust provides hospitals at Castle Hill Hospital, Hull Royal Infirmary and Beverley's Westwood Hospital. Scarborough and North East Yorkshire Healthcare NHS Trust runs Bridlington Hospital and also provides health care from the Alfred Bean Hospital at Driffield and the Malton Community Hospital which are run by the local primary care trusts (NHS East Riding and NHS North Yorkshire and York). Small cottage and community hospitals provide a range of services at Hornsea Cottage Hospital and Withernsea Community Hospital.

There are ten household waste recycling sites across the East Riding. In the 2004–05 financial year 210,112 tonnes (206,794 long tons; 231,609 short tons) of municipal waste was collected by East Riding and 154,723 tonnes (152,279 long tons; 170,553 short tons) by Hull. Between 2003–04 and 2004–05 the amount of waste collected in Hull increased by 1.77% (2,696 tonnes [2,653 long tons; 2,972 short tons]) and in the East Riding by 4.80% (9,629 tonnes [9,477 long tons; 10,614 short tons]). Target 45+ is a joint sustainable waste-management strategy developed in partnership by Hull City Council and the East Riding of Yorkshire Council. The overall aim is to achieve 45% recycling or composting by 2010 and then go beyond this. At the outset it was anticipated that recycling rates in the East Riding by the end of 2005–06 would be 22.4% and in Hull the rate would be 17.4%. The Waste Recycling Group is a company working in partnership with the Hull City and East Riding of Yorkshire councils to deal with waste. The company has plans to build an energy from waste plant at Saltend to deal with 240,000 tonnes (240,000 long tons; 260,000 short tons) of rubbish and put waste to a productive use by providing power for the equivalent of 20,000 houses.

The East Riding of Yorkshire is notably high for recycling rates. The county was marked the first Unitary Authority in England for household waste recycling, composting and re-use rate in 2021. Figures highlight that 60.8% of household waste in the county was recycled or composted, ahead of second-place North Somerset who were marked at 60.4%.

== Sport and leisure ==
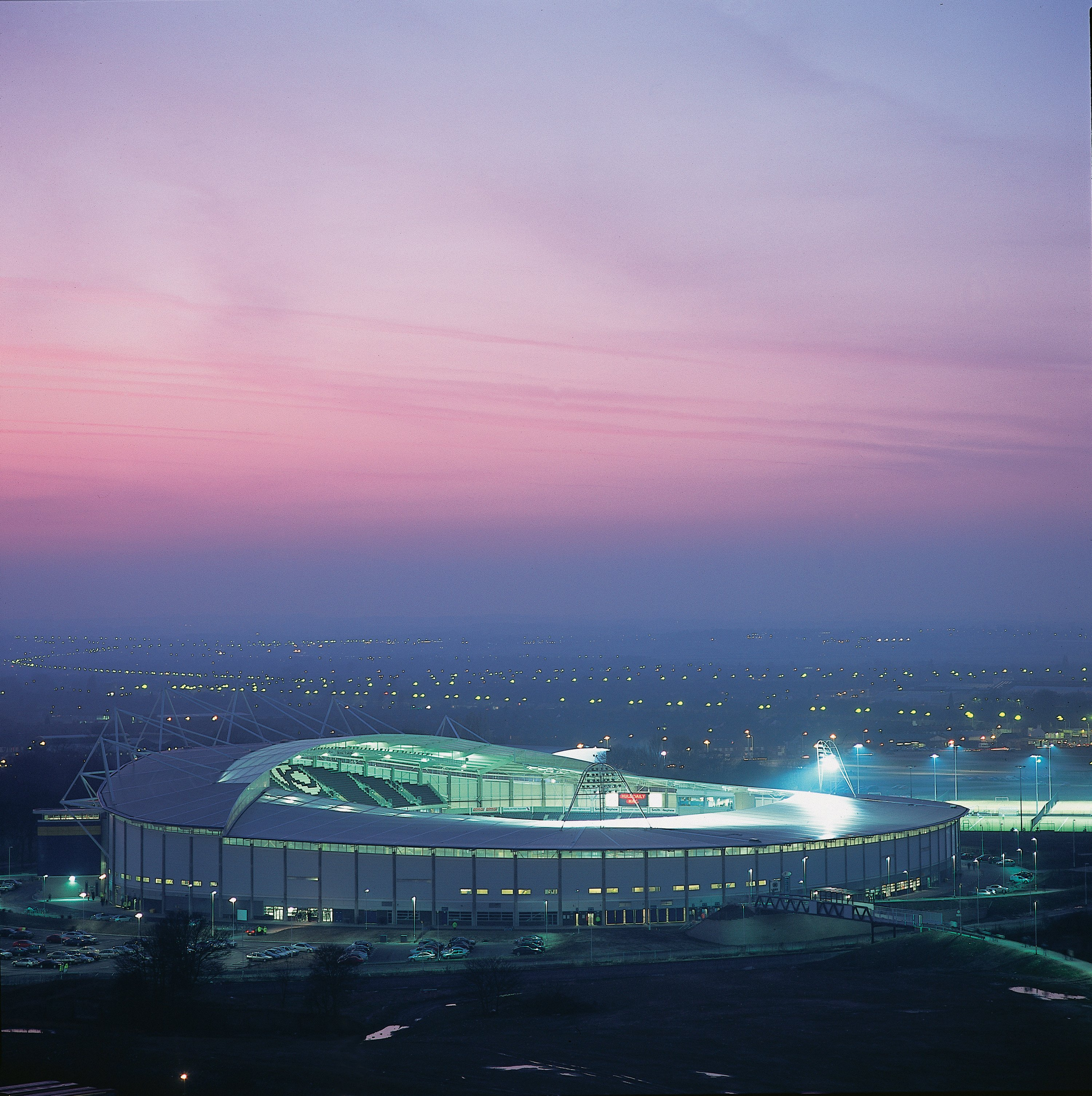
The MKM Stadium, Hull

Hull is the main centre for national-level sport in the region. Hull City A.F.C., play in the Premier League, the first tier of the English football league system, after promotion through the playoffs from the Championship. Bridlington Town A.F.C., Beverley Town F.C. and North Ferriby all play in the Northern Premier League East Division. and Hall Road Rangers played in Division One until resigning before the 2022–23 season.

There are two professional rugby league teams based in Hull: Hull F.C. and Hull Kingston Rovers who play in the Super League. Bridlington Rugby Union Football Club plays at Dukes Park in Bridlington. The Hull Pirates ice hockey team were founded in 2015 and played in the National Ice Hockey League's National League, but were replaced by Hull Seahawks for the 2022–23 season.

Horse racing is catered for at Beverley Racecourse on the Westwood to the west of Beverley. What the organisers claim is the world's oldest horse race, the Kiplingcotes Derby, has been held annually in the East Riding since 1519. There are more than a dozen golf clubs in the Riding including the cliff-top course at Flamborough. The Royal Yorkshire Yacht Club is based at Bridlington, and flying and gliding take place from Pocklington airfield and Eddsfield airfield.

== Media ==
The region is covered by BBC Yorkshire and Lincolnshire based in Hull and ITV Yorkshire, broadcast from Leeds. BBC Local Radio for the county is served by BBC Radio Humberside and BBC Radio York (covering Pocklington). County-wide commercial radio stations are Capital Yorkshire, Hits Radio East Yorkshire & North Lincolnshire, Greatest Hits Radio East Yorkshire and Nation Radio East Yorkshire. The county also has four Community radio stations Great Driffield Radio, which covers Great Driffield and the surrounding villages, Seaside FM, which serves the Holderness area on 105.3 FM MHz, Vixen 101 which serves Market Weighton and Pocklington and 107.8 Beverley FM which serves Beverley and the surrounding areas.

Newspapers include the Hull Daily Mail, owned by Reach plc. An East Riding Mail was launched in March 2006 as a sister paper to this. Other newspapers in the area include the Bridlington Free Press, the Goole Times, the Holderness Gazette, and the Driffield & Wolds Weekly. The Beverley Guardian and the Driffield Times & Post used to serve the area but closed in 2016.

== See also ==
- Custos Rotulorum of the East Riding of Yorkshire – Keepers of the Rolls
- Grade I listed buildings in the East Riding of Yorkshire
- Grade I listed churches in the East Riding of Yorkshire
- Grade II* listed buildings in the East Riding of Yorkshire
- List of High Sheriffs of the East Riding of Yorkshire
- List of Lord Lieutenants of the East Riding of Yorkshire

== Bibliography ==
- Allison, K. J. (1976). The East Riding of Yorkshire Landscape. The Making of the English Landscape. London: Hodder and Stoughton Limited. ISBN 0-340-15821-2.
- Van de Noort, Robert (2004). The Humber Wetlands. Landscapes of Britain. Macclesfield, Cheshire: Windgather Press. ISBN 0-9545575-4-9.
- Muir, Richard (1997). The Yorkshire Countryside. A Landscape History. Edinburgh: Keele University Press. ISBN 1-85331-198-7.
- Wilson, Vernon (1948). East Yorkshire and Lincolnshire. British Regional Geology. London: HMSO. OCLC 2281266.
