= East Riding of Yorkshire Council elections =

English local authority elections

The East Riding of Yorkshire is a unitary authority in the ceremonial county of the East Riding of Yorkshire, England. It was created on 1 April 1996 replacing East Yorkshire, East Yorkshire Borough of Beverley, Holderness, part of Boothferry and Humberside County Council.

The East Riding of Yorkshire Council is fully elected every four years.

The council consists of 67 councillors who are elected from 26 wards. Each ward elects one, two or three councillors.

== Summary results ==
Year	Conservative	Liberal Democrat	Independent	Labour	Yorkshire Party	Notes
2023	29	22	9	4	3	
2019	49	8	8	0	2	(Note: This changed by subsequent by-elections, and defections.)

== Council elections ==
- 1995 East Riding of Yorkshire Council election
- 1999 East Riding of Yorkshire Council election
- 2003 East Riding of Yorkshire Council election (new ward boundaries)
- 2007 East Riding of Yorkshire Council election
- 2011 East Riding of Yorkshire Council election
- 2015 East Riding of Yorkshire Council election
- 2019 East Riding of Yorkshire Council election
- 2023 East Riding of Yorkshire Council election

== Results maps ==
2003 results map

2007 results map

2011 results map

2015 results map

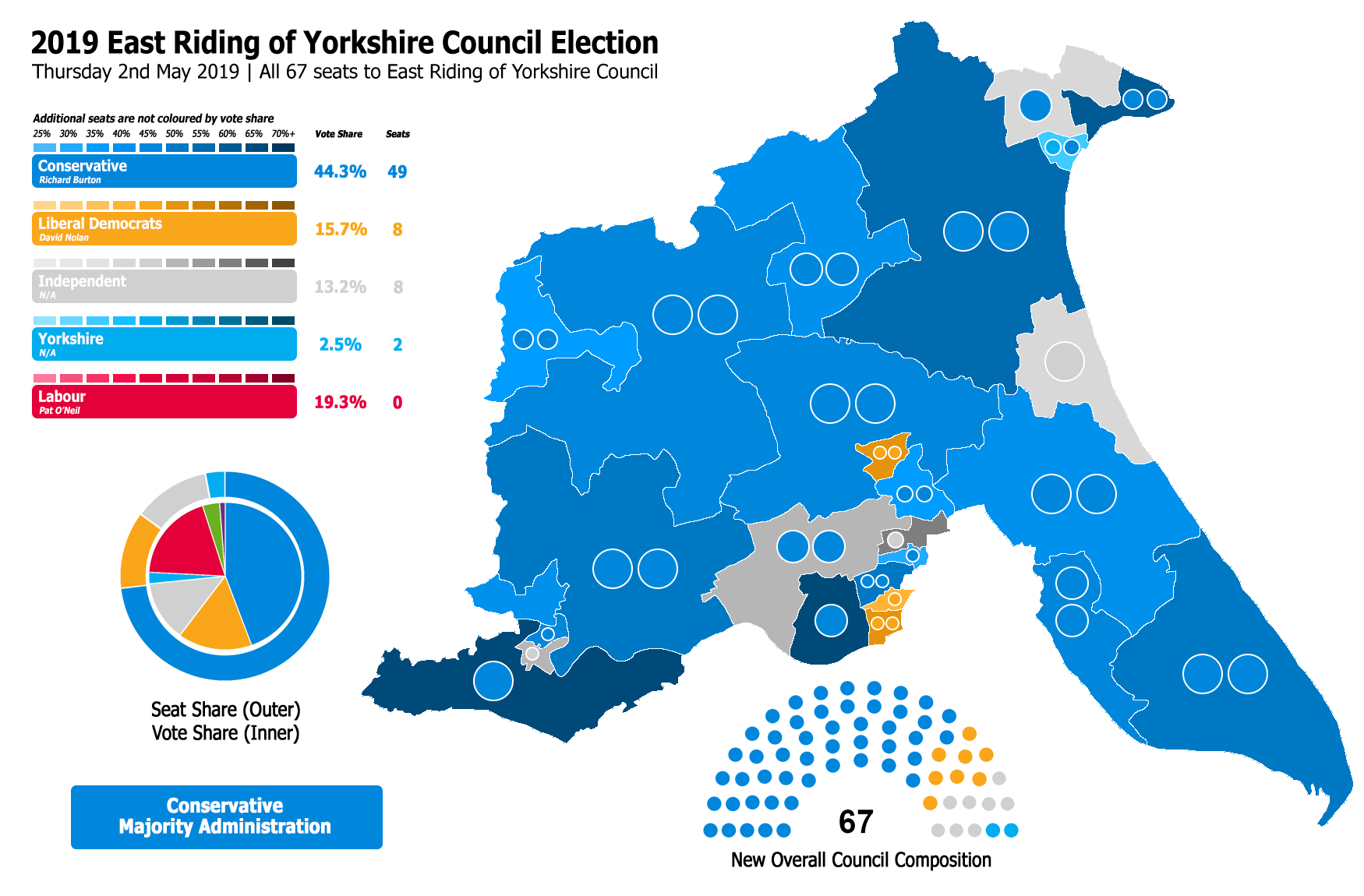
2019 results map

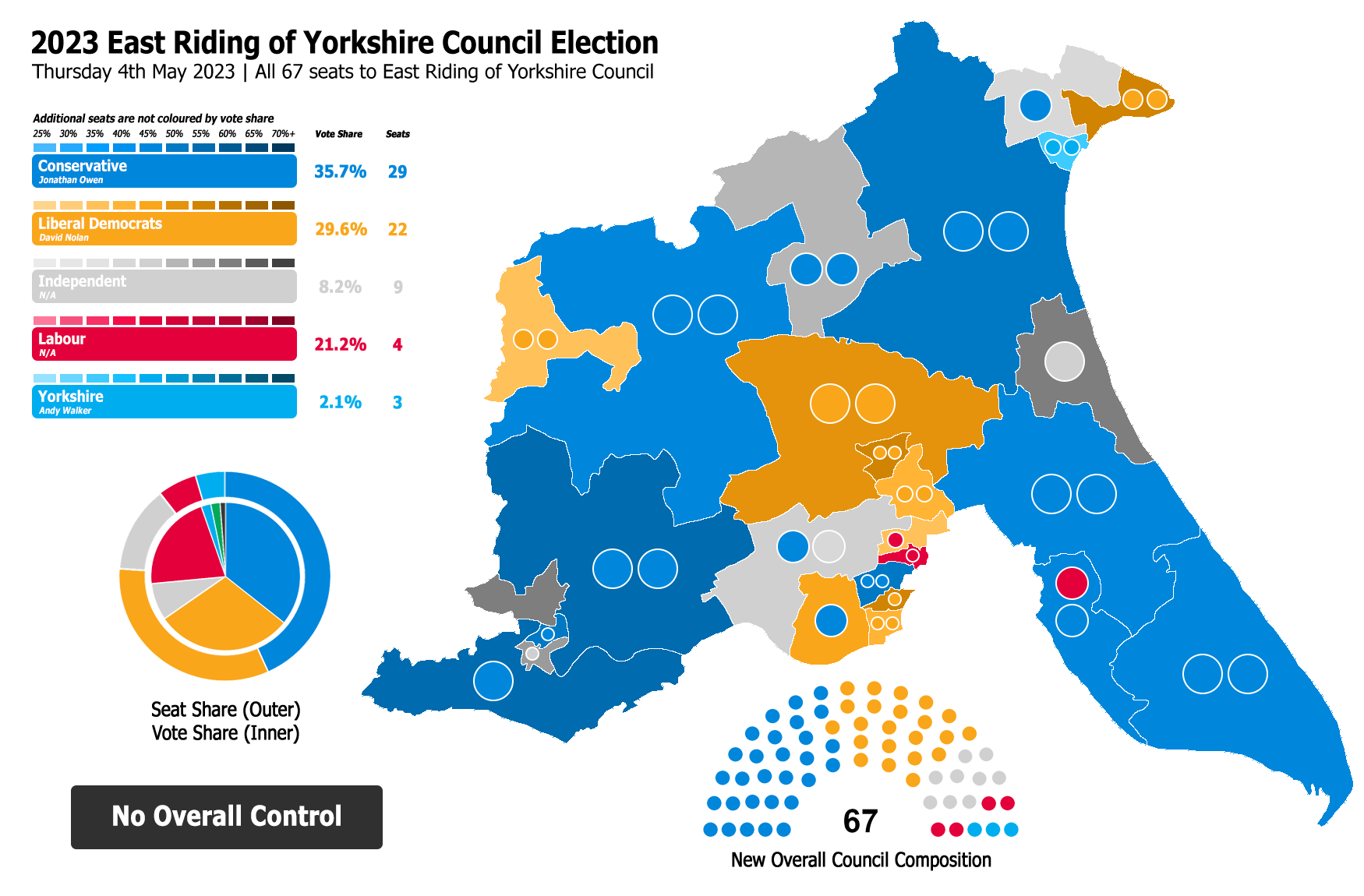
2023 results map

== By-election results ==
=== 1995–1999 ===
Pocklington Provincial by-election 10 October 1996
Party	Candidate	Votes	%	±%
Independent		945	28.9	
Conservative		901	27.5	
Liberal Democrats		768	23.5	
Labour		657	20.1	
Majority		44	1.4	
Turnout		3,271		
Independent hold		Swing		

Howden by-election 17 July 1997
Party	Candidate	Votes	%	±%
Liberal Democrats		672	46.3	+40.9
Conservative		525	36.1	+10.0
Independent		157	10.8	−25.3
Labour		99	6.8	−25.6
Majority		147	10.2	
Turnout		1,453	43.6	
Liberal Democrats gain from Independent		Swing		

Boothferry West by-election 9 October 1997
Party	Candidate	Votes	%	±%
Liberal Democrats		1,036	48.0	+39.4
Labour		617	28.6	−24.0
Independent Labour		315	14.6	−14.5
Conservative		175	8.1	−1.3
Independent		15	0.7	+0.7
Majority		419	19.4	
Turnout		2,158	32.3	
Liberal Democrats gain from Labour		Swing		

Dale by-election 16 July 1998
Party	Candidate	Votes	%	±%
Conservative		2,085	47.5	+9.6
Liberal Democrats		2,081	47.4	−5.2
Labour		227	5.1	−4.4
Majority		4	0.1	
Turnout		4,393	42.0	
Conservative gain from Liberal Democrats		Swing		

=== 1999–2003 ===
Howden By-Election 27 July 2000
Party	Candidate	Votes	%	±%
Liberal Democrats	Jon Neal	853	60.2	−3.9
Conservative		450	31.8	+7.9
UKIP		114	8.0	+8.0
Majority		403	28.4	
Turnout		1,417	41.0	
Liberal Democrats hold		Swing		

Goole By-Election 6 September 2001
Party	Candidate	Votes	%	±%
Liberal Democrats		1,542	61.4	+24.4
Labour		670	26.7	−12.9
Conservative		172	6.9	−5.6
Independent		118	4.7	+4.7
Independent		8	0.3	+0.3
Majority		872	34.7	
Turnout		2,510	31.0	
Liberal Democrats hold		Swing		

Beverley Rural by-election 18 July 2002
Party	Candidate	Votes	%	±%
Conservative		1,515	46.5	−7.1
Liberal Democrats		1,318	40.4	+14.3
Labour		426	13.1	+0.0
Majority		197	6.1	
Turnout		3,259	33.1	
Conservative hold		Swing		

=== 2003–2007 ===
Hessle By-Election 19 June 2003 (3)
Party	Candidate	Votes	%	±%
Liberal Democrats		2,108		
Liberal Democrats		2,043		
Liberal Democrats		2,029		
Conservative		472		
Conservative		472		
Conservative		452		
Labour		343		
Labour		318		
Labour		298		
UKIP		255		
Turnout		8,535	26.5	

Howden by-election 8 December 2005
Party	Candidate	Votes	%	±%
Conservative	Mark Preston	644	48.7	+6.3
Liberal Democrats	Ingrid Ridley	621	47.0	−6.5
Labour	John Frost	57	4.3	+0.2
Majority		23	1.7	
Turnout		1,322	36.0	
Conservative gain from Liberal Democrats		Swing		

=== 2011–2015 ===
South East Holderness by-election 3 May 2012
Party	Candidate	Votes	%	±%
Conservative	Kevan Hough	1,187	37.5	+1.5
Labour	Jed Lee	1,011	32.0	+11.3
Independent	John Windas	971	30.6	+30.6
Majority		176	5.5	−5.6
Turnout		3,169	26.9	
Conservative hold		Swing		

Howdenshire by-election 2 May 2013
Party	Candidate	Votes	%	±%
Conservative	Victoria Aitken	1,573	43.6	−1.8
UKIP	Clive Waddington	1,260	34.9	+34.9
Labour	Mike Whitley	563	15.6	+1.6
Liberal Democrats	Alan Luckraft	212	5.9	−1.3
Majority		313	8.7	−19.3
Turnout		3,608	30.0	
Conservative hold		Swing		

Mid Holderness by-election 2 May 2013
Party	Candidate	Votes	%	±%
Conservative	John Holtby	1,353	38.9	−10.1
UKIP	Gary Shores	1,269	36.5	+36.5
Labour Co-op	George McManus	852	24.5	−7.3
Majority		84	2.4	−14.8
Turnout		3,474	30.7	
Conservative hold		Swing		

Bridlington Central and Old Town by-election 27 November 2014
Party	Candidate	Votes	%	±%
UKIP	Malcolm Milns	401	30.8	+30.8
Conservative	John Copsey	352	27.1	−2.0
Independent	Liam Dealtry	217	16.7	+16.7
Independent	Terry Dixon	214	16.5	+16.5
Independent	Neil Tate	116	8.9	+8.9
Majority		49	3.7	+3.7
Turnout		1,300	15.2	
UKIP gain from SDP		Swing		

Howdenshire by-election 27 November 2014
Party	Candidate	Votes	%	±%
Conservative	Nigel Wilkinson	1,020	46.2	+0.8
UKIP	Clive Waddington	891	40.3	+40.3
Labour	Danny Marten	298	13.5	−0.5
Majority		129	5.9	−22.1
Turnout		2,209	18.2	
Conservative hold		Swing		

Willerby and Kirk Ella by-election 27 November 2014
Party	Candidate	Votes	%	±%
Conservative	Mick Burchill	1,522	55.6	+9.4
UKIP	Robert Skinner	699	25.5	+25.5
Labour	Daniel Palmer	515	18.8	+2.7
Majority		823	30.1	+13.5
Turnout		2,736	24.8	
Conservative hold		Swing		

=== 2015–2019 ===
Pocklington Provincial by-election 7 April 2016
Party	Candidate	Votes	%	±%
Independent	Andy Strangeway	1,032	38.0	+38.0
Conservative	Paul West	980	36.1	−8.1
Labour	Lucie Spadone	490	18.0	−2.0
UKIP	Neil Tate	215	7.9	−11.6
Majority		52	1.9	+1.9
Turnout		2,717	21.2	
Independent gain from Conservative		Swing		

East Wolds and Coastal by-election 5 May 2016
Party	Candidate	Votes	%	±%
Conservative	Paul Lisseter	1,885	52.7	−11.8
Labour	Tom Lee	860	24.0	+9.1
UKIP	Peter Watts	835	23.3	+3.0
Majority		1,025	28.7	+8.1
Turnout		3,580	31.0	
Conservative hold		Swing		

South East Holderness by-election 4 August 2016
Party	Candidate	Votes	%	±%
Conservative	David Tucker	917	38.5	+3.6
Labour	Patrick Wilkinson	806	33.8	+7.9
UKIP	Andrew Weaver	390	16.4	−13.2
Independent	Dave Edwards	173	7.3	+7.3
Liberal Democrats	Helen Wright	97	4.1	+4.1
Majority		111	4.7	−0.6
Turnout		2,383	20.3	
Conservative hold		Swing		

St Mary's by-election 20 October 2016
Party	Candidate	Votes	%	±%
Liberal Democrats	Denis Healy	1,497	40.0	+28.7
Conservative	Roy Begg	947	25.3	−3.2
Labour	Margaret Pinder	689	18.4	+0.6
Beverley Party	Bea Willar	364	9.7	−1.2
Independent	Christine Harrod	141	3.8	+3.8
UKIP	John Kitchener	101	2.7	−10.3
Majority		550	14.7	
Turnout		3,739	29	
Liberal Democrats gain from Conservative		Swing		

=== 2019–2023 ===
Bridlington North by-election 11 July 2019
Party	Candidate	Votes	%	±%
Liberal Democrats	Mike Heslop-Mullens	1,308	42.7	
Conservative	Martin Burnhill	815	26.6	
Yorkshire	Paul Walker	349	11.4	
UKIP	Gary Shores	196	6.4	
Labour	Mike Dixon	135	4.4	
Independent	Terry Dixon	125	4.1	
Independent	David Robson	76	2.5	
Independent	Thelma Milns	56	1.9	
Majority		493		
Turnout		3,072	26.73	
Liberal Democrats gain from Conservative		Swing		

South East Holderness by-election 6 May 2021
Party	Candidate	Votes	%	±%
Conservative	Claire Holmes	1,624	52.1	
Liberal Democrats	Dave Edwards	691	22.2	
Labour	James Ireland	396	12.7	
Yorkshire	Ricky Hoggard	317	10.2	
Reform	Rich Kelly	89	2.9	
Majority		933		
Turnout		3,143	27.60	
Conservative hold		Swing		

South West Holderness by-election 6 May 2021
Party	Candidate	Votes	%	±%
Conservative	David Winter	1,304	39.9	
Labour	Steve Gallant	814	24.9	
Liberal Democrats	Matthew Grove	626	19.1	
Independent	James Baron	525	16.1	
Majority		490		
Turnout		3,282	28.81	
Conservative hold		Swing		

South Hunsley by-election 7 April 2022
Party	Candidate	Votes	%	±%
Liberal Democrats	Margaret Corless	1,351	54.7	
Conservative	Paul Kenneth Hopton	907	36.8	
Labour	Dafydd Taylor	110	4.5	
Green	Stewart Arnold	100	4.1	
Majority		444		
Turnout		2,472	29.42	
Liberal Democrats gain from Conservative		Swing		

Bridlington North by-election 30 June 2022
Party	Candidate	Votes	%	±%
Liberal Democrats	Jayne Phoenix	1,950	57.1	
Conservative	Jonathan Bibb	1,077	31.5	
Labour	David Butland	171	5.0	
SDP	Carlo Verda	125	3.7	
Yorkshire	Kimberley Thomas	93	2.7	
Majority		873		
Turnout		3,422		
Liberal Democrats gain from Conservative		Swing		

Beverley Rural by-election 25 August 2022
Party	Candidate	Votes	%	±%
Liberal Democrats	Diana Stewart	1,948	59.4	
Conservative	Peter Stevens	1,116	34.1	
Labour	Clare Wildey	213	6.5	
Majority		832		
Turnout		3,294		
Liberal Democrats gain from Conservative		Swing		

=== 2023–2027 ===
Minster and Woodmansey by-election 29 February 2024
Party	Candidate	Votes	%	±%
Liberal Democrats	Tony Henderson	1,438	50.7	+9
Conservative	David Keith Elvidge	706	24.9	−4
Labour	Ron Laden	495	17.4	−12
Green	Jonathan Stephenson	198	7.0	New
Majority		732	25.8	
Turnout		2.854	21.1	−10.8
Registered electors		13,543		
Liberal Democrats hold		Swing	+6.5	

Held following the death of Pete Astell.

Tranby by-election 29 February 2024
Party	Candidate	Votes	%	±%
Liberal Democrats	Ross Harrison	958	55.3	+4.1
Labour	Malcolm Richard Stather	408	23.6	+3.1
Conservative	Michael Stephen Whitehead	268	15.5	+3.7
Green	Jane Nicola Robinson	97	5.6	−2.5
Majority		550	31.7	
Turnout		1,737	21.6	−5.0
Registered electors		8,045		
Liberal Democrats hold		Swing	+0.5	

Held following the death of Viv Padden.

East Wolds and Coastal by-election 4 July 2024
Party	Candidate	Votes	%	±%
Conservative	Jonathan Bibb	3,105	41.6	
Liberal Democrats	Gary Lugg	1,823	24.4	
Labour	Mike Dixon	1,144	15.3	
Yorkshire	Peter Garforth	634	8.5	
Green	Jane Lloyd	451	6.0	
Independent	Andrew Frost	300	4.0	
Majority		1,282	17.2	
Turnout		7,457		
Conservative hold		Swing		

Held following the resignation of Charlie Dewhirst.

South East Holderness by-election 4 July 2024
Party	Candidate	Votes	%	±%
Reform	Jon Dimberline	2,027	34.8	
Conservative	David Winter	1,755	30.1	
Labour	Ian Blackburn	1,550	26.6	
Liberal Democrats	Matthew Grove	498	8.5	
Majority		272	4.7	
Turnout		5,830		
Reform gain from Conservative		Swing		

Held following the resignation of Claire Holmes.
