= 2015 East Riding of Yorkshire Council election =

2015 local election in England

← 2011	7 May 2015	2019 →

All 67 seats to East Riding of Yorkshire Council 34 seats needed for a majority
	First party	Second party	Third party
Party	Conservative	Labour	Independent
Last election	53, 79.1%	6, 9.0%	3, 4.5%
Seats won	51	6	5
Seat change	▼2	Steady	▲2
Popular vote	67,241	39,700	15,799
Percentage	37.1%	21.9%	8.7%
Swing	▼3.1%	▼0.4%	▼3.1%
	Fourth party	Fifth party
Party	UKIP	Liberal Democrats
Last election	0, 0.0%	3, 4.5%
Seats won	3	2
Seat change	▲3	▼1
Popular vote	34,069	17,900
Percentage	18.8%	9.9%
Swing	▲18.3%	▼4.9%
- Results of the 2015 East Riding of Yorkshire Council election
Council control before election
Conservative
Council control after election
Conservative

The 2015 East Riding of Yorkshire Council election took place on 7 May 2015 to elect members of East Riding of Yorkshire Council in England. This was on the same day as other local elections across the country. All 67 seats were contested. The Conservatives retained control of the council, surpassing the 34-seat majority threshold with 51 seats, down 2 from the last election.

== Election result ==
2015 East Riding of Yorkshire Council election result
Party	Seats	Gains	Losses	Net gain/loss	Seats %	Votes %	Votes	+/−
Conservative	51	2	4	–2	76.1	37.1	67,241	–3.1
Labour	6	1	1	0	9.0	21.9	39,700	–0.4
UKIP	3	3	0	3	4.5	18.8	34,069	+18.3
Liberal Democrats	2	0	1	–1	3.0	9.9	17,900	–4.9
Independent	5	3	1	2	7.5	8.7	15,799	–3.1
Green	0	0	0	0	0.0	2.0	3,544	–0.8
Beverley Party	0	0	0	0	0.0	1.4	2,485	+1.4
Yorkshire First	0	0	0	0	0.0	0.3	554	+0.3

== Ward results ==
=== Beverley Rural ===
Beverley Rural (3 seats)
Party	Candidate	Votes	%	±%
Conservative	Stephen Parnaby	4,012	41.1	+1.9
Conservative	Phyllis Pollard	3,738		
Conservative	Bradley Birmingham	3,438		
UKIP	Gary Shores	1,615	16.6	+16.6
Labour	Wendy Cross	1,591	16.3	–3.1
Labour	Jan Davis	1,446		
Liberal Democrats	Alison Healy	1,305	13.4	–2.0
Green	Phil Grimes	1,234	12.6	+12.6
Labour	Cherry Walton	1,192		
Total votes		19,571		
Conservative hold		Swing		
Conservative hold		Swing		
Conservative hold		Swing		

=== Bridlington Central and Old Town ===
Bridlington Central and Old Town (2 seats)
Party	Candidate	Votes	%	±%
Conservative	Richard Burton	1,925	34.0	+4.9
UKIP	Malcolm Milns	1,653	29.2	+29.2
Labour	Peter Astell	1,355	23.9	–3.9
Labour	John Morton	920		
Liberal Democrats	Mike Heslop-Mullens	733	12.9	+7.3
Total votes		6,586		
Conservative hold		Swing		
UKIP gain from SDP		Swing		

=== Bridlington North ===
Bridlington North (3 seats)
Party	Candidate	Votes	%	±%
Conservative	Richard Harrap	3,115	36.1	–31.3
Conservative	Chris Matthews	2,505		
UKIP	Thelma Milns	2,185	25.3	+25.3
Conservative	John Wilkinson	1,904		
Labour	Ronnie Morrison	1,796	20.8	–11.8
Independent	Terry Dixon	1,533	17.8	+17.8
Total votes		13,038		
Conservative hold		Swing		
Conservative hold		Swing		
UKIP gain from Conservative		Swing		

=== Bridlington South ===
Bridlington South (3 seats)
Party	Candidate	Votes	%	±%
UKIP	David Robson	1,891	29.5	+15.7
Labour	Shelagh Finlay	1,836	28.6	–2.5
Conservative	Margaret Chadwick	1,775	27.7	–3.9
Conservative	Chad Chadwick	1,713		
Conservative	John Copsey	1,713		
Labour	Colin Croft	1,537		
Labour	Jackie Heffer	1,259		
Independent	Timothy Norman	498	7.8	–6.9
Liberal Democrats	Geofrey Ormerod	419	6.5	–2.4
Total votes		10,928		
UKIP gain from Conservative		Swing		
Labour hold		Swing		
Conservative hold		Swing		

=== Cottingham North ===
Cottingham North (2 seats)
Party	Candidate	Votes	%	±%
Independent	Rosamund Jump	1,710	35.4	+35.4
Independent	Geraldine Mathieson	1,397		
Conservative	Eric Roustoby	1,253	26.0	–28.7
Conservative	Angus West	1,163		
Labour	Daniel Marten	976	20.2	–5.2
Labour	Lynne Petersen	851		
UKIP	Colin Shores	614	12.7	+12.7
Liberal Democrats	Phillip Redshaw	274	5.7	–14.2
Liberal Democrats	Patricia Ellis	254		
Total votes		8,492		
Independent gain from Conservative		Swing		
Independent gain from Conservative		Swing		

=== Cottingham South ===
Cottingham South (2 seats)
Party	Candidate	Votes	%	±%
Conservative	Helen Green	2,077	46.7	+7.9
Conservative	Mike Medini	1,675		
Labour	Alexander Duke	1,518	34.1	+7.9
Labour	Julia Marten	1,490		
Liberal Democrats	Win Knight	853	19.2	–15.8
Liberal Democrats	Richard Weighill	582		
Total votes		8,195		
Conservative hold		Swing		
Conservative hold		Swing		

=== Dale ===
Dale (3 seats)
Party	Candidate	Votes	%	±%
Conservative	Tony Galbraith	4,609	38.0	–6.4
Conservative	Pat Smith	3,904		
Conservative	Richard Meredith	3,786		
Independent	Coleen Gill	2,952	24.3	–3.1
Labour	Richard Newlove	1,719	14.2	+0.6
UKIP	Howard Floyd	1,709	14.1	+14.1
Labour	Ian Hardy	1,388		
Liberal Democrats	Jack Brown	1,145	9.4	–5.1
Labour	Simon Pickering	1,088		
Liberal Democrats	Frank Beill	832		
Total votes		23,132		
Conservative hold		Swing		
Conservative hold		Swing		
Conservative hold		Swing		

=== Driffield and Rural ===
Driffield and Rural (3 seats)
Party	Candidate	Votes	%	±%
Conservative	Symon Fraser	2,977	38.7	–3.4
Conservative	Barbara Hall	2,965		
Conservative	Felicity Temple	2,568		
Labour	Joyce Fletcher	1,604	20.9	–1.3
Labour	David Credland	1,473		
Labour	Paul Rounding	1,447		
UKIP	Neil Tate	1,434	18.6	+18.6
Independent	Stephen Poessl	989	12.9	+12.9
Independent	Matt Rogers	816		
Liberal Democrats	Marcus Ramshaw	687	8.9	–2.4
Independent	Kevin Stack	385		
Total votes		17,345		
Conservative hold		Swing		
Conservative hold		Swing		
Conservative hold		Swing		

=== East Wolds and Coastal ===
East Wolds and Coastal (3 seats)
Party	Candidate	Votes	%	±%
Conservative	Jane Evison	4,185	40.9	–13.7
Conservative	Jonathan Owen	3,788		
Conservative	Margaret Chapman	3,366		
UKIP	Peter Watts	2,080	20.3	+20.3
Labour	Douglas Hope	1,527	14.9	–2.5
Green	Mike Jackson	1,393	13.6	–5.1
Labour	Felicity Walmsley	1,334		
Liberal Democrats	Moira Ormerod	1,040	10.2	+0.9
Total votes		18,713		
Conservative hold		Swing		
Conservative hold		Swing		
Conservative hold		Swing		

=== Goole North ===
Goole North (2 seats)
Party	Candidate	Votes	%	±%
Labour	Keith Moore	1,994	36.8	+5.9
Independent	Josie Head	1,771	32.7	+15.1
UKIP	David Jeffreys	1,654	30.5	+30.5
Labour	Gillian Boatman	1,615		
Total votes		7,034		
Labour hold		Swing		
Independent gain from East Yorkshire Independents		Swing		

=== Goole South ===
Goole South (2 seats)
Party	Candidate	Votes	%	±%
Labour	Mally Boatman	1,317	39.8	–2.6
Labour	Pat O'Neil	1,182		
UKIP	Barbara Jeffreys	1,006	30.4	+30.4
UKIP	Mark Green	914		
Conservative	Liz Sargeantson	672	20.3	–1.3
Conservative	Robert Lingard	589		
Independent	Kevin Flynn	314	9.5	–8.3
Total votes		5,994		
Labour hold		Swing		
Labour hold		Swing		

=== Hessle ===
Hessle (3 seats)
Party	Candidate	Votes	%	±%
Liberal Democrats	Phil Davison	2,337	32.8	–1.5
Labour	Paul Hogan	2,260	31.7	+0.6
Labour	Iain Billinger	2,194		
Labour	Renee Sheehan	2,028		
Liberal Democrats	David Nolan	1,990		
Liberal Democrats	Margot Sutton	1,958		
Conservative	Edward Liddell	1,282	18.0	–2.8
Conservative	Richard Lamb	1,126		
Conservative	Richard McConnell	1,084		
UKIP	Jim Chapman	1,053	14.8	+14.8
UKIP	Mark Fox	906		
UKIP	Ben Fuller	871		
Independent	Phil Withers	187	2.6	–2.5
Total votes		19,276		
Liberal Democrats hold		Swing		
Labour hold		Swing		
Labour gain from Liberal Democrats		Swing		

=== Howden ===
Howden (1 seat)
Party	Candidate	Votes	%	±%
Conservative	Charlie Bayram	1,644	59.9	+16.6
Labour	Bernard Singleton	639	23.3	+6.6
Liberal Democrats	Alan Luckraft	463	16.9	–23.0
Total votes		2,746		
Conservative hold		Swing		

=== Howdenshire ===
Howdenshire (3 seats)
Party	Candidate	Votes	%	±%
Conservative	Victoria Aitken	Unopposed		
Conservative	Linda Bayram	Unopposed		
Conservative	Nigel Wilkinson	Unopposed		
Conservative hold		Swing		
Conservative hold		Swing		
Conservative hold		Swing		

=== Mid Holderness ===
Mid Holderness (3 seats)
Party	Candidate	Votes	%	±%
Conservative	John Holtby	3,516	46.1	–2.9
Conservative	Peter Turner	3,019		
Conservative	Brian Skow	2,628		
UKIP	Andy Weaver	2,170	28.5	+28.5
Labour	Mary Carrick	1,936	25.4	–6.4
Labour	Nidge Thornton	1,865		
Labour	David Beech	1,823		
Total votes		16,957		
Conservative hold		Swing		
Conservative hold		Swing		
Conservative hold		Swing		

=== Minster and Woodmansey ===
Minster and Woodmansey (3 seats)
Party	Candidate	Votes	%	±%
Conservative	David Elvidge	3,050	34.3	+1.1
Conservative	Kerri Harold	2,947		
Conservative	Dominic Peacock	2,469		
Labour	Alan Ablett	2,341	26.3	–1.5
Labour	Ann Willis	2,256		
Labour	George McManus	2,042		
UKIP	Brian Render	1,579	17.8	+17.8
Beverley Party	Howard Tomlinson	1,306	14.7	+14.7
Beverley Party	Derek Schultz	1,021		
Liberal Democrats	Judy Jones	613	6.9	–6.8
Liberal Democrats	Stewart Willie	480		
Total votes		20,104		
Conservative hold		Swing		
Conservative hold		Swing		
Conservative hold		Swing		

=== North Holderness ===
North Holderness (2 seats)
Party	Candidate	Votes	%	±%
Independent	Barbara Jefferson	2,283	38.1	–12.8
Independent	John Whittle	1,487		
Conservative	Guy Miller	1,205	20.1	–13.2
UKIP	Sean Gaughan	1,083	18.1	+18.1
Conservative	David Thorne	950		
Labour	Michael Smallwood	869	14.5	–1.3
Labour	John Youle	631		
Yorkshire First	Lee Walton	554	9.2	+9.2
Total votes		9,062		
Independent hold		Swing		
Independent hold		Swing		

=== Pocklington Provincial ===
Pocklington Provincial (3 seats)
Party	Candidate	Votes	%	±%
Conservative	Kay West	4,542	44.2	+4.6
Conservative	Stephen Lane	4,426		
Conservative	Claude Mole	4,118		
Labour	Fiona Bruce	2,054	20.0	+3.3
Labour	Tony Williams	2,040		
UKIP	Sue Woodcock	2,001	19.5	+19.5
Labour	Cynthia Collier	1,997		
Liberal Democrats	Sue Taylor	1,684	16.4	+3.0
Total votes		22,862		
Conservative hold		Swing		
Conservative hold		Swing		
Conservative hold		Swing		

=== Snaith, Airmyn, Rawcliffe and Marshland ===
Snaith, Airmyn, Rawcliffe and Marshland (2 seats)
Party	Candidate	Votes	%	±%
Conservative	John Barrett	2,848	54.5	–11.7
Conservative	Caroline Fox	2,740		
Labour	Ian Blackburn	1,245	23.8	–10.0
UKIP	Ron Thornton	1,133	21.7	+21.7
Labour	Terence Smith	1,004		
Total votes		8,970		
Conservative hold		Swing		
Conservative hold		Swing		

=== South East Holderness ===
South East Holderness (3 seats)
Party	Candidate	Votes	%	±%
Conservative	Arthur Hodgson	2,406	34.9	–4.1
Conservative	Lyn Healing	2,400		
Conservative	Jackie Cracknell	2,313		
UKIP	Paddy Fisher	2,043	29.6	+29.6
Labour	Pat Beech	1,783	25.9	+5.2
Labour	Jed Lee	1,591		
Labour	Matthew Lloyd	1,531		
Independent	Dave Edwards	660	9.6	–18.3
Total votes		14,727		
Conservative hold		Swing		
Conservative hold		Swing		
Conservative hold		Swing		

=== South Hunsley ===
South Hunsley (2 seats)
Party	Candidate	Votes	%	±%
Conservative	Julie Abraham	4,281	71.6	+0.6
Conservative	Vanessa Walker	3,185		
Labour	Chay Bell	989	16.5	–0.2
Labour	Helen Wise	852		
Liberal Democrats	Tom Nolan	711	11.9	–0.5
Liberal Democrats	Emma Dolman	579		
Total votes		10,597		
Conservative hold		Swing		
Conservative hold		Swing		

=== South West Holderness ===
South West Holderness (3 seats)
Party	Candidate	Votes	%	±%
Conservative	John Dennis	3,062	37.6	+1.8
Conservative	Mike Bryan	2,704		
Conservative	Sue Steel	2,368		
Labour	Neil Black	2,190	26.9	+5.0
UKIP	Terry West	2,108	25.9	+25.9
Labour	Steve Gallant	1,987		
Labour	Brian Stockdale	1,815		
Independent	Sarah Rommell	775	9.5	–20.1
Total votes		17,009		
Conservative hold		Swing		
Conservative hold		Swing		
Conservative gain from Independent		Swing		

=== St Mary's ===
St Mary's (3 seats)
Party	Candidate	Votes	%	±%
Conservative	Elaine Aird	3,069	29.7	–0.4
Conservative	Bryan Pearson	2,721		
Conservative	Irene Charis	2,456		
Labour	Ben Cooper	1,910	18.5	0.0
Labour	Paul McGrath	1,669		
Labour	David Sweet	1,560		
UKIP	Walter Sweeney	1,399	13.5	+13.5
Liberal Democrats	Denis Healy	1,215	11.7	–6.2
Beverley Party	Christine Harrod	1,179	11.4	+11.4
Liberal Democrats	Neil Bant	1,124		
Liberal Democrats	David Horsley	1,039		
Beverley Party	Beate Willar	998		
Beverley Party	Robert Begnett	978		
Green	Peter Dack	917	8.9	–2.9
Independent	Alistair Crompton	660	6.4	–15.3
Independent	Neil Harris	393		
Total votes		23,287		
Conservative hold		Swing		
Conservative hold		Swing		
Conservative hold		Swing		

=== Tranby ===
Tranby (2 seats)
Party	Candidate	Votes	%	±%
Liberal Democrats	Mary-Rose Hardy	2,114	41.0	+7.3
Conservative	Mary Kingston	1,773	34.4	+13.4
Liberal Democrats	Patrick Gradwell	1,607		
Conservative	Yvonne Hetherington	1,424		
Labour	Daniel Palmer	1,267	24.6	–8.6
Labour	Dermot Rathbone	1,058		
Total votes		9,243		
Liberal Democrats hold		Swing		
Conservative gain from Labour		Swing		

=== Willerby and Kirk Ella ===
Willerby and Kirk Ella (3 seats)
Party	Candidate	Votes	%	±%
Conservative	Shaun Horton	3,815	47.0	+0.8
Conservative	Gary McMaster	3,003		
Conservative	Dee Sharpe	2,902		
UKIP	Mick Burchill	1,744	21.5	+21.5
UKIP	Michael Whitehead	1,588		
Labour	Roger Coates	1,499	18.5	+2.4
UKIP	Stephen Kersey	1,473		
Labour	Judy Dickinson	1,156		
Labour	Lee Wise	1,064		
Liberal Democrats	Peter Gardiner	1,060	13.1	–16.5
Liberal Democrats	Lilian McCobb	929		
Liberal Democrats	Tony McCobb	908		
Total votes		21,141		
Conservative hold		Swing		
Conservative hold		Swing		
Conservative hold		Swing		

=== Wolds Weighton ===
Wolds Weighton (3 seats)
Party	Candidate	Votes	%	±%
Conservative	David Rudd	4,148	40.4	–4.8
Conservative	Andy Burton	3,778		
Conservative	Mike Stathers	3,344		
UKIP	Andy Strangeway	1,915	18.7	+18.7
Labour	Andrew Boothroyd	1,485	14.5	+0.5
Independent	Peter Hemmerman	1,467	14.3	+14.3
Labour	Joy Thompson	1,388		
Liberal Democrats	Dale Needham	1,247	12.2	+3.4
Labour	William Thompson	1,108		
Total votes		19,880		
Conservative hold		Swing		
Conservative hold		Swing		
Conservative hold		Swing		
