= Rachael Bell =

Rachael or Rachel Bell may refer to:

- Rachael Bell, political candidate in East Riding of Yorkshire Council election, 2011
- Rachel Bell (born 1950), British actress

== See also ==
- Rachael Bella (born 1984), American actress
