= 2011 East Riding of Yorkshire Council election =

2011 local election in England

← 2007	5 May 2011	2015 →

All 67 seats to East Riding of Yorkshire Council 34 seats needed for a majority
	First party	Second party	Third party
Party	Conservative	Labour	Liberal Democrats
Last election	47, 70.1%	3, 4.5%	12, 18.0%
Seats won	53	6	3
Seat change	▲6	▲3	▼9
Popular vote	47,426	26,349	17,451
Percentage	40.2%	22.3%	14.8%
Swing	▼0.7%	▲8.8%	▼13.1%
	Fourth party	Fifth party	Sixth party
Party	Independent	East Yorkshire Independents	SDP
Last election	4, 6.0%	0, 0.0%	1, 1.5%
Seats won	3	1	1
Seat change	▼1	▲1	Steady
Popular vote	13,900	6,696	1,167
Percentage	11.8%	5.7%	1.0%
Swing	▲0.8%	▲5.7%	▼0.9%
- Results of the 2011 East Riding of Yorkshire Council election
Council control before election
Conservative
Council control after election
Conservative

The 2011 East Riding of Yorkshire Council election took place on 5 May 2011 to elect members of East Riding of Yorkshire Council in England. This was on the same day as other local elections across the country. All 67 seats were contested. The Conservatives retained control of the council, surpassing the 34-seat majority threshold with 53 seats, up 6 from the last election.

== Election result ==
2011 East Riding of Yorkshire Council election result
Party	Seats	Gains	Losses	Net gain/loss	Seats %	Votes %	Votes	+/−
Conservative	53	7	1	+6	79.1	40.2	47,426	–0.7%
Labour	6	4	1	+3	9.0	22.3	26,349	+8.8%
Liberal Democrats	3	0	9	–9	4.5	14.8	17,451	–13.1%
Independent	3	0	1	–1	4.5	11.8	13,900	+0.8%
East Yorkshire Independents	1	1	0	+1	1.5	5.7	6,696	+5.7%
Green	0	0	0	0	0.0	2.8	3,301	+1.1%
SDP	1	0	0	0	1.5	1.0	1,167	–0.9%
English Democrat	0	0	0	0	0.0	1.0	1,164	+0.4%
UKIP	0	0	0	0	0.0	0.5	539	+0.5%

== Ward results ==
=== Beverley Rural ===
Beverley Rural (3 seats)
Party	Candidate	Votes	%	±%
Conservative	Phyllis Pollard	2,767	39.2	–26.2
Conservative	Bradley Birmingham	2,714		
Conservative	Stephen Parnaby	2,714		
Independent	Penelope Peacock	1,842	26.1	+26.1
Labour	Angela Hancock	1,367	19.4	+5.1
Labour	James Pybus	1,153		
Liberal Democrats	Judyth Jones	1,085	15.4	–4.9
Total votes		13,642		
Conservative hold		Swing		
Conservative hold		Swing		
Conservative hold		Swing		

=== Bridlington Central and Old Town ===
Bridlington Central and Old Town (2 seats)
Party	Candidate	Votes	%	±%
SDP	Raymond Allerston	1,167	37.6	+0.5
Conservative	Richard Burton	903	29.1	+3.2
Labour	Liam Dealtry	864	27.8	+16.9
Conservative	John Copsey	685		
Labour	Peter Astell	644		
SDP	Jackie Foster	497		
Liberal Democrats	Linda Chambers	173	5.6	–5.9
Total votes		4,933		
SDP hold		Swing		
Conservative hold		Swing		

=== Bridlington North ===
Bridlington North (3 seats)
Party	Candidate	Votes	%	±%
Conservative	Richard Harrap	2,713	67.4	+25.9
Conservative	Chris Matthews	2,449		
Conservative	John Wilkinson	2,161		
Labour	Elliot Sparks	1,313	32.6	+18.5
Labour	George McManus	1,085		
Labour	Cherry Walton	990		
Total votes		10,711		
Conservative hold		Swing		
Conservative hold		Swing		
Conservative hold		Swing		

=== Bridlington South ===
Bridlington South (3 seats)
Party	Candidate	Votes	%	±%
Conservative	Margaret Chadwick	1,235	31.6	+0.6
Labour	Shelagh Finlay	1,216	31.1	+9.1
Conservative	Chad Chadwick	1,175		
Labour	Dave Grange	1,083		
Labour	Danny Marten	886		
Conservative	Geoff Pickering	831		
Independent	Cyril Marsburg	573	14.7	+14.7
UKIP	Malcolm Milns	539	13.8	+13.8
UKIP	Thelma Milns	419		
Liberal Democrats	Keith Chambers	347	8.9	–2.7
Liberal Democrats	Michael Heslop-Mullens	275		
Total votes		7,538		
Conservative hold		Swing		
Labour gain from Conservative		Swing		
Conservative hold		Swing		

=== Cottingham North ===
Cottingham North (2 seats)
Party	Candidate	Votes	%	±%
Conservative	Ros Jump	1,665	54.7	+5.7
Conservative	Geraldine Mathieson	1,462		
Labour	Mick Armitage	774	25.4	+15.7
Labour	Richard Bridge	740		
Liberal Democrats	Gary Cooper	605	19.9	–12.7
Liberal Democrats	Richard Weighill	596		
Total votes		5,842		
Conservative hold		Swing		
Conservative hold		Swing		

=== Cottingham South ===
Cottingham South (2 seats)
Party	Candidate	Votes	%	±%
Conservative	Helen Green	1,237	38.8	–1.7
Conservative	Lena Slater	1,127		
Liberal Democrats	Win Knight	1,117	35.0	–12.0
Liberal Democrats	Katrin McClure	1,031		
Labour	Sam Kind	837	26.2	+13.7
Labour	Julia Marten	786		
Total votes		6,135		
Conservative gain from Liberal Democrats		Swing		
Conservative gain from Liberal Democrats		Swing		

=== Dale ===
Dale (3 seats)
Party	Candidate	Votes	%	±%
Conservative	Rita Hudson	3,315	44.4	–11.3
Conservative	Tony Galbraith	2,925		
Conservative	Patricia Smith	2,603		
Independent	Coleen Gill	2,046	27.4	+27.4
Liberal Democrats	Anita Kay	1,084	14.5	–24.9
Labour	Anthony Bridge	1,013	13.6	+8.7
Labour	Christopher Howarth	934		
Labour	Louise Turner	888		
Liberal Democrats	Suzanne Davison	646		
Liberal Democrats	David Luckraft	566		
Total votes		6,135		
Conservative hold		Swing		
Conservative hold		Swing		
Conservative hold		Swing		

=== Driffield and Rural ===
Driffield and Rural (3 seats)
Party	Candidate	Votes	%	±%
Conservative	Symon Fraser	1,993	42.1	–12.6
Conservative	Barbara Hall	1,980		
Conservative	Felicity Temple	1,931		
East Yorkshire Independents	Stephen Poessl	1,155	24.4	+24.4
Labour	Joyce Fletcher	1,048	22.2	+2.4
Labour	Granville Credland	922		
Labour	Paul Rounding	870		
Liberal Democrats	Richard Gorski	535	11.3	–14.3
Liberal Democrats	Geoffrey Ormerod	466		
Total votes		10,900		
Conservative hold		Swing		
Conservative hold		Swing		
Conservative hold		Swing		

=== East Wolds and Coastal ===
East Wolds and Coastal (3 seats)
Party	Candidate	Votes	%	±%
Conservative	Jane Evison	2,769	54.6	+3.9
Conservative	Jonathan Owen	2,595		
Conservative	Margaret Chapman	2,511		
Green	Michael Jackson	949	18.7	+4.4
Labour	Elizabeth Whitfield	883	17.4	+7.5
Labour	Gillian Boatman	778		
Labour	Daniel Young	609		
Liberal Democrats	Moira Ormerod	470	9.3	–2.5
Liberal Democrats	Grace Gorski	431		
Liberal Democrats	Geoffrey Boland	418		
Total votes		12,413		
Conservative hold		Swing		
Conservative hold		Swing		
Conservative hold		Swing		

=== Goole North ===
Goole North (2 seats)
Party	Candidate	Votes	%	±%
Labour	Keith Moore	1,090	30.9	+5.0
East Yorkshire Independents	Josephine Head	1,072	30.4	+30.4
Labour	William Frost	805		
Liberal Democrats	Jean Kitchen	745	21.1	–22.5
Independent	Mavis Vines	620	17.6	+17.6
Total votes		4,332		
Labour hold		Swing		
East Yorkshire Independents gain from Liberal Democrats		Swing		

=== Goole South ===
Goole South (2 seats)
Party	Candidate	Votes	%	±%
Labour	Malcolm Boatman	907	37.2	+5.1
Labour	Patricia O'Neil	871		
East Yorkshire Independents	Kevin Flynn	569	23.3	+23.3
Conservative	Kenneth Hammond	528	21.6	+6.1
Independent	Christoph Rick	435	17.8	–3.4
Total votes		3,310		
Labour hold		Swing		
Labour gain from Liberal Democrats		Swing		

=== Hessle ===
Hessle (3 seats)
Party	Candidate	Votes	%	±%
Liberal Democrats	Brian Jefferies	1,471	34.3	–25.8
Liberal Democrats	Phil Davison	1,459		
Labour	Paul Hogan	1,335	31.1	+15.9
Labour	Robin Bettison	1,334		
Liberal Democrats	David Prattley	1,269		
Labour	Joseph Key	1,257		
Conservative	Howard Jennings	893	20.8	–3.9
Conservative	John Wilding	793		
Conservative	Matthew Leonard	673		
English Democrat	Victoria Carter	367	8.6	+8.6
English Democrat	Peter Mawer	333		
English Democrat	Michael Burton	291		
Independent	Simon Pickering	220	5.1	+5.1
Total votes		11,695		
Liberal Democrats hold		Swing		
Liberal Democrats hold		Swing		
Labour gain from Liberal Democrats		Swing		

=== Howden ===
Howden (1 seat)
Party	Candidate	Votes	%	±%
Conservative	Charlie Bayram	750	43.4	–14.8
Liberal Democrats	Ingrid Haywood	689	39.9	+2.8
Labour	Paul Ablett	288	16.7	+12.0
Total votes		1,727		
Conservative hold		Swing		

=== Howdenshire ===
Howdenshire (3 seats)
Party	Candidate	Votes	%	±%
Conservative	Paul Robinson	2,640	45.4	–3.5
Conservative	Doreen Engall	2,347		
Conservative	Nicholas Evans	2,212		
Independent	Bernard Darley	1,013	17.4	–3.2
East Yorkshire Independents	Christopher Worrall	925	15.9	+15.9
Labour	Matthew Gibson	815	14.0	+7.3
Labour	Mike Whitley	811		
Labour	Rachael Bell	754		
Liberal Democrats	Angela Hunter	421	7.2	–16.6
Liberal Democrats	Fiona Braithwaite	386		
Liberal Democrats	Valerie Wood	353		
Independent	Geofrey Harrison	326		
Total votes		13,003		
Conservative hold		Swing		
Conservative hold		Swing		
Conservative hold		Swing		

=== Mid Holderness ===
Mid Holderness (3 seats)
Party	Candidate	Votes	%	±%
Conservative	Matthew Grove	2,331	49.0	–6.1
Conservative	Peter Turner	2,255		
Conservative	Brian Skow	1,910		
Labour	Judy Dickinson	1,513	31.8	+19.1
Labour	Jan Davis	1,471		
Labour	Trevor Whatmore	1,174		
Liberal Democrats	John Leeman	910	19.1	–16.9
Total votes		11,564		
Conservative hold		Swing		
Conservative hold		Swing		
Conservative hold		Swing		

=== Minster and Woodmansey ===
Minster and Woodmansey (3 seats)
Party	Candidate	Votes	%	±%
Conservative	David Elvidge	2,075	33.2	+0.2
Conservative	Kerri Harold	2,064		
Conservative	Dominic Peacock	1,764		
Labour	James Whitfield	1,733	27.8	–3.6
Labour	David Sweet	1,559		
Labour	Paul McGrath	1,552		
Green	Shan Oakes	889	14.2	+1.2
Liberal Democrats	Bessie Foot	857	13.7	–8.9
Independent	Beate Willar	689	11.0	+11.0
Total votes		13,182		
Conservative hold		Swing		
Conservative hold		Swing		
Conservative gain from Labour		Swing		

=== North Holderness ===
North Holderness (2 seats)
Party	Candidate	Votes	%	±%
Independent	Barbara Jefferson	1,911	50.9	+7.4
Independent	John Whittle	1,415		
Conservative	Carl Milson	1,248	33.3	+10.9
Labour	John Youle	592	15.8	+7.3
Labour	Ken Thorley	505		
Total votes		5,671		
Independent hold		Swing		
Independent hold		Swing		

=== Pocklington Provincial ===
Pocklington Provincial (3 seats)
Party	Candidate	Votes	%	±%
Conservative	Kay West	2,228	39.6	–1.0
Conservative	Stephen Lane	2,186		
Conservative	Claude Mole	1,933		
East Yorkshire Independents	Jeff Shepherd	1,698	30.2	+30.2
East Yorkshire Independents	Richard Bryon	1,623		
East Yorkshire Independents	Tony Marron	1,356		
Labour	Cynthia Collier	940	16.7	+3.5
Labour	Michael Harrison	766		
Liberal Democrats	Susan Taylor	754	13.4	–2.2
Labour	Stephen Harrison	678		
Total votes		14,162		
Conservative hold		Swing		
Conservative hold		Swing		
Conservative hold		Swing		

=== Snaith, Airmyn, Rawcliffe and Marshland ===
Snaith, Airmyn, Rawcliffe and Marshland (2 seats)
Party	Candidate	Votes	%	±%
Conservative	John Barrett	1,886	66.2	+21.6
Conservative	Caroline Fox	1,825		
Labour	Ian Blackburn	962	33.8	–0.4
Labour	Bryan Dicker	951		
Total votes		5,624		
Conservative hold		Swing		
Conservative hold		Swing		

=== South East Holderness ===
South East Holderness (3 seats)
Party	Candidate	Votes	%	±%
Conservative	Richard Stead	1,791	39.0	–2.7
Conservative	Arthur Hodgson	1,534		
Conservative	Jackie Cracknell	1,482		
Independent	John Windas	1,281	27.9	+1.6
Labour	Dave Beech	951	20.7	+8.2
Labour	Patricia Beech	920		
Labour	Jed Lee	892		
Liberal Democrats	Brian Cloke	569	12.4	–7.1
Independent	Chuck Hunter	560		
Independent	Neil Whitelam	543		
Independent	Patrick Spicer	465		
Independent	Thomas Fisher	255		
Total votes		11,243		
Conservative hold		Swing		
Conservative hold		Swing		
Conservative hold		Swing		

=== South Hunsley ===
South Hunsley (2 seats)
Party	Candidate	Votes	%	±%
Conservative	Julie Abraham	2,688	71.0	–0.3
Conservative	Helen Gilmour	2,441		
Labour	Alex MacFarlane	631	16.7	+9.4
Labour	Gillian Sheard	576		
Liberal Democrats	Alexandra Eagle	468	12.4	–9.7
Liberal Democrats	Patricia Jones	386		
Total votes		7,190		
Conservative hold		Swing		
Conservative hold		Swing		

=== South West Holderness ===
South West Holderness (3 seats)
Party	Candidate	Votes	%	±%
Conservative	John Dennis	1,846	35.8	+13.9
Conservative	Mike Bryan	1,723		
Independent	Ann Suggit	1,529	29.6	–1.6
Labour	Brian Stockdale	1,130	21.9	+12.3
Labour	Carol Williams	1,025		
Labour	Neil Watts	916		
Liberal Democrats	Steve Sloan	656	12.7	–24.6
Liberal Democrats	Janet Selkirk	619		
Independent	Adam Lonsdale	568		
Liberal Democrats	Ken Wilson	507		
Total votes		10,519		
Conservative gain from Liberal Democrats		Swing		
Conservative gain from Liberal Democrats		Swing		
Independent hold		Swing		

=== St Mary's ===
St Mary's (3 seats)
Party	Candidate	Votes	%	±%
Conservative	Bryan Pearson	2,416	30.1	+3.92
Conservative	Elaine Aird	2,362		
Conservative	Irene Charis	1,785		
Independent	Kathleen Gray	1,741	21.7	–3.3
Labour	Stuart Pearce	1,486	18.5	+7.2
Labour	Jack Falkingham	1,458		
Liberal Democrats	John Bird	1,436	17.9	–10.5
Labour	Margaret Pinder	1,399		
Green	Bill Rigby	947	11.8	+3.4
Liberal Democrats	David Horsley	870		
Liberal Democrats	Neil Bant	808		
Total votes		16,708		
Conservative hold		Swing		
Conservative gain from Liberal Democrats		Swing		
Conservative gain from Independent		Swing		

=== Tranby ===
Tranby (2 seats)
Party	Candidate	Votes	%	±%
Liberal Democrats	Mary-Rose Hardy	1,093	33.7	–19.1
Labour	Josh Newlove	1,077	33.2	+26.5
Labour	Daniel Palmer	1,058		
Liberal Democrats	Mary Kingston	1,046		
Conservative	Stephen Kersey	683	21.0	+0.7
Conservative	Vanessa Walker	581		
English Democrat	Michael Cassidy	394	12.1	–8.1
English Democrat	Peter Asquith-Cowen	367		
Total votes		6,299		
Liberal Democrats hold		Swing		
Labour gain from Liberal Democrats		Swing		

=== Willerby and Kirk Ella ===
Willerby and Kirk Ella (3 seats)
Party	Candidate	Votes	%	±%
Conservative	Angela Ibson	2,300	46.2	–5.2
Conservative	Shaun Horton	2,163		
Conservative	Michael Whitehead	2,039		
Liberal Democrats	Fred Smith	1,476	29.6	–14.0
Liberal Democrats	Jo Carden	1,443		
Liberal Democrats	Chris Lawson	1,324		
Labour	Roger Coates	801	16.1	+11.0
Labour	Alan Sheard	705		
Labour	John Marten	682		
English Democrat	Graham Robinson	403	8.1	+8.1
English Democrat	Joanne Robinson	387		
English Democrat	John Ottaway	318		
Total votes		14,041		
Conservative hold		Swing		
Conservative hold		Swing		
Conservative hold		Swing		

=== Wolds Weighton ===
Wolds Weighton (3 seats)
Party	Candidate	Votes	%	±%
Conservative	David Rudd	2,526	45.2	–7.5
Conservative	Andy Burton	2,288		
Conservative	Dee Sharpe	2,093		
East Yorkshire Independents	Nigel Chicken	1,277	22.8	+22.8
East Yorkshire Independents	Peter Hemmerman	1,146		
East Yorkshire Independents	Malcolm Lindley	897		
Labour	Martha Hanson	783	14.0	–0.3
Labour	Kim Peake	740		
Labour	Douglas Hope	724		
Green	Mark Maloney	516	9.2	+9.2
Liberal Democrats	Dale Needham	490	8.8	–4.9
Liberal Democrats	Alan Allsopp	489		
Total votes		13,969		
Conservative hold		Swing		
Conservative hold		Swing		
Conservative hold		Swing		
