= 2023 East Riding of Yorkshire Council election =

2023 local election in England

- 4 May 2023

All 67 seats to East Riding of Yorkshire Council 34 seats needed for a majority
- Turnout: 29.3%

	First party	Second party	Third party
Leader	Anne Handley	Denis Healy	N/A (Note: Of the nine independent councillors after the election, eight formed the "Independent Group" led by Barbara Jefferson.)
Party	Conservative	Liberal Democrats	Independent
Last election	49 seats, 44.3%	8 seats, 15.7%	8 seats, 13.2%
Seats before	42	13	10
Seats won	29	22	9
Seat change	▼20	▲14	▲1
Popular vote	69,544	57,637	15,907
Percentage	35.7%	29.6%	8.2%
Swing	▼8.7%	▲13.9%	▼5.0%
	Fourth party	Fifth party
Leader	n/a	Andy Walker
Party	Labour	Yorkshire
Last election	0 seats, 18.3%	2 seats, 2.5%
Seats before	0	2
Seats won	4	3
Seat change	▲4	▲1
Popular vote	41,282	4,126
Percentage	21.2%	2.1%
Swing	▲2.9%	▼0.4%
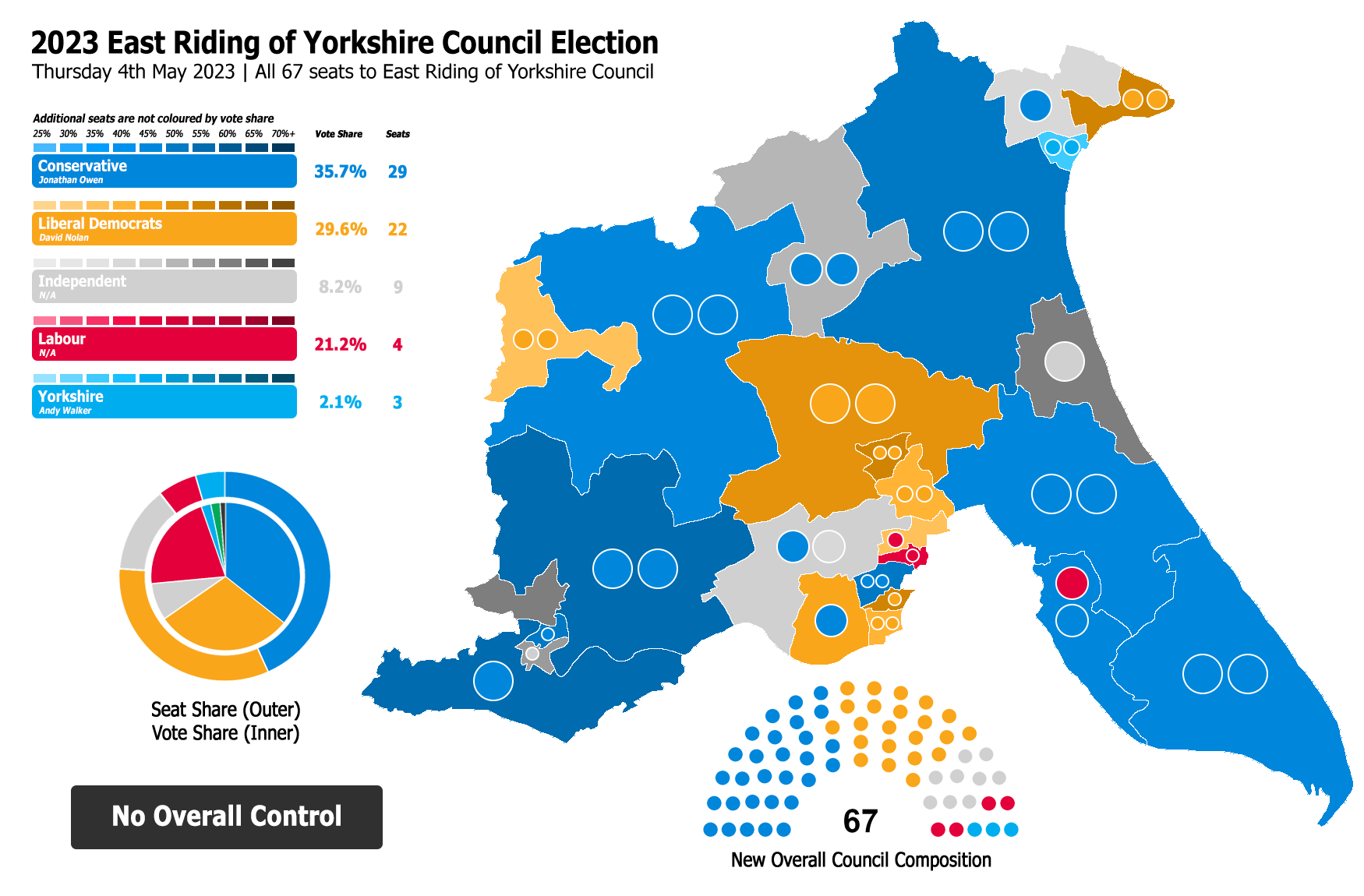
- Map of the results of the election by ward
Leader before election
Jonathan Owen
Conservative
Leader after election
Anne Handley
Conservative
No overall control

The 2023 East Riding of Yorkshire Council election took place on 4 May 2023 to elect all 67 members of East Riding of Yorkshire Council in England. This was on the same day as other local elections across England.

The Conservatives lost their majority on the council at this election, which saw the council go under no overall control.

The Conservatives remained the largest party and managed to form a minority administration. Immediately after the election the Conservatives and Liberal Democrats both changed their group leaders. The Conservative leader Jonathan Owen was replaced by Anne Handley, who was then appointed the new leader of the council at the subsequent annual council meeting on 18 May 2023. The Liberal Democrats replaced their leader David Nolan with Denis Healy. There had been no Labour councillors prior to the election; there were four afterwards and they appointed Steve Gallant as their leader.

== Results summary ==
2023 East Riding of Yorkshire Council election
Party	Candidates	Seats	Gains	Losses	Net gain/loss	Seats %	Votes %	Votes	+/−
Conservative	60	29	0	20	▼20	43.2	35.7	69,544	-8.7
Liberal Democrats	65	22	14	0	▲14	32.8	29.6	57,637	+13.9
Labour	59	4	4	0	▲4	6.0	21.2	41,282	+2.9
Independent	17	9	1	0	▲1	13.4	8.2	15,907	-5.0
Yorkshire	6	3	1	0	▲1	4.5	2.1	4,126	-0.4
Green	9	0	0	0	Steady	0.0	2.0	3,868	-1.6
Reform	3	0	0	0	Steady	0.0	0.6	1,259	New
SDP	3	0	0	0	Steady	0.0	0.2	398	New
TUSC	2	0	0	0	Steady	0.0	0.1	276	New
ADF	1	0	0	0	Steady	0.0	0.1	182	New
Freedom Alliance (UK)	1	0	0	0	Steady	0.0	0.1	98	New

Almost a quarter of the 67 councillors prior to the election did not stand for re-election.

== Ward results ==
Sitting councillors are marked with an asterisk (*).

=== Beverley Rural ===
Beverley Rural (3 seats)
Party	Candidate	Votes	%	±%
Liberal Democrats	Diana Stewart*	2,131	53.3	+29.3
Liberal Democrats	Paul Smith	1,870	46.8	+20.6
Liberal Democrats	Jeremy Wilcock	1,786	44.7	+25.5
Conservative	Madeleine Horton	1,494	37.4	−12.3
Conservative	Richard Warren	1,412	35.3	−12.4
Conservative	Richard Royal	1,314	32.9	−12.2
Labour	Wendy Cross	464	11.6	−1.4
Labour	Clare Wildey	400	10.0	−1.4
Labour	John Fawcett	397	9.9	−0.4
Registered electors		11,216		
Rejected ballots		22	0.6	
Turnout		4,000	35.7	−0.8
Liberal Democrats gain from Conservative				
Liberal Democrats gain from Conservative				
Liberal Democrats gain from Conservative				

=== Bridlington Central and Old Town ===
Bridlington Central and Old Town (2 seats)
Party	Candidate	Votes	%	±%
Independent	Liam Dealtry*	830	42.9	+0.7
Conservative	Maria Ibbotson	622	32.1	−4.4
Liberal Democrats	Ray Pollard	619	32.0	+22.5
Liberal Democrats	John Arthur	501	25.9	N/A
Labour	David Sweet	350	18.1	−0.5
SDP	Carlo Verda	228	11.8	N/A
Registered electors		8,355		
Rejected ballots		15	0.8	
Turnout		1,936	23.17	−2.33
Independent hold				
Conservative hold				

=== Bridlington North ===
Bridlington North (3 seats)
Party	Candidate	Votes	%	±%
Liberal Democrats	Jayne Phoenix*	2,055	55.2	N/A
Liberal Democrats	Mike Heslop-Mullens*	1,994	53.6	N/A
Liberal Democrats	Thomas Robson	1,710	45.9	N/A
Conservative	John Copsey	1,130	30.4	−31.4
Conservative	Jonathan Bibb	1,089	29.3	−31.0
Conservative	Bob Taylor	990	26.6	−30.2
Labour	Carol Williams	394	10.6	−14.6
Independent	Malcolm Milns	250	6.7	N/A
Reform	Tommy Cawkwell	239	6.4	N/A
SDP	Joy Verda	118	3.2	N/A
Registered electors		11,334		
Rejected ballots		12	0.3	
Turnout		3,723	32.85	+3.45
Liberal Democrats gain from Conservative				
Liberal Democrats gain from Conservative				
Liberal Democrats gain from Conservative				

=== Bridlington South ===
Bridlington South (3 seats)
Party	Candidate	Votes	%	±%
Yorkshire	Andy Walker*	762	37.5	+2.2
Yorkshire	Tim Norman*	699	34.4	−1.1
Yorkshire	Rick Arrand	576	28.3	N/A
Labour	Jakey Anderson	550	27.0	−0.3
Conservative	Jaya Authunuri	481	23.6	−5.4
Conservative	Kimberley-Nicholle Thomas	472	23.2	−1.9
Labour	Hollie Devanney	435	21.4	−0.5
Independent	Thelma Milns	261	12.8	−12.1
Liberal Democrats	Angela Walker	209	10.3	N/A
Liberal Democrats	Ingrid Haywood	172	8.5	N/A
Reform	Sean Cooper	157	7.7	N/A
Liberal Democrats	Ed King	108	5.3	N/A
Freedom Alliance	Alan Thompson	98	4.8	N/A
SDP	Chris Daniels	52	2.6	N/A
Registered electors		10,662		
Rejected ballots		38	1.9	
Turnout		2,034	19.08	−4.92
Yorkshire hold				
Yorkshire hold				
Yorkshire gain from Conservative				

=== Cottingham North ===
Cottingham North (2 seats)
Party	Candidate	Votes	%	±%
Liberal Democrats	Phillip Redshaw	877	37.1	+29.7
Labour	Alex Duke	776	32.9	+18.5
Liberal Democrats	Graham Johnson	763	32.3	+25.1
Labour	Danny Marten	722	30.6	+16.6
Conservative	George Bennett	572	24.2	+9.2
Conservative	Owen McConaghy	516	21.8	+7.2
Reform	Roger Hoe	232	9.8	N/A
Registered electors		6,727		
Rejected ballots		6	0.3	
Turnout		2,362	35.11	−0.29
Liberal Democrats gain from Independent				
Labour gain from Independent				

=== Cottingham South ===
Cottingham South (2 seats)
Party	Candidate	Votes	%	±%
Labour	Carolyn Cantrell	1,263	47.7	+21.3
Labour	Kevin Casson	1,239	46.8	+24.0
Conservative	Mike Medini*	955	36.1	+3.7
Conservative	Helen Green*	948	35.8	+1.9
Liberal Democrats	Keith Stubbs	395	14.9	+0.6
Liberal Democrats	Fran Hessen	296	11.2	−1.6
Registered electors		7,503		
Rejected ballots		21	0.8	
Turnout		2,647	35.28	+1.88
Labour gain from Conservative				
Labour gain from Conservative				

=== Dale ===
Dale (3 seats)
Party	Candidate	Votes	%	±%
Independent	Terry Gill*	2,179	48.6	−5.3
Conservative	Richard Meredith*	2,153	48.0	+5.6
Independent	Coleen Gill	2,065	46.1	N/A
Conservative	Pat Smith*	1,680	37.5	−6.2
Conservative	Marinos Loizides	1,157	25.8	−15.2
Labour	Paul Cantrell	767	17.1	+3.7
Labour	Stephanie Haywood	752	16.8	N/A
Labour	Ann Wordingham	663	14.8	+3.4
Liberal Democrats	Mukesh Tirkoti	592	13.2	−6.2
Registered electors		13,838		
Rejected ballots		22	0.5	
Turnout		4,484	32.40	−1.8
Independent hold				
Conservative hold				
Independent gain from Conservative				

=== Driffield and Rural ===
Driffield and Rural (3 seats)
Party	Candidate	Votes	%	±%
Independent	Mark Blakeston	1,718	50.8	+21.4
Conservative	Matt Rogers*	1,202	35.5	−3.5
Conservative	Michael Lee*	1,038	30.7	−4.6
Conservative	Andrew Frost	949	28.1	−13.0
Labour	Wendy Phillips	873	25.8	+8.3
Labour	Thomas Watson	767	22.7	+3.0
Labour	Richard Phillips	764	22.6	+5.8
Independent	David Thorley	680	20.1	N/A
Liberal Democrats	Jenny Aspden	330	9.8	−0.1
Liberal Democrats	Hollie Haeney	324	9.6	+1.7
Liberal Democrats	Richard Hawkins	224	6.6	−1.1
Registered electors		12,640		
Rejected ballots		10	0.3	
Turnout		3,383	26.76	−1.34
Independent gain from Conservative				
Conservative hold				
Conservative hold				

=== East Wolds and Coastal ===
East Wolds and Coastal (3 seats)
Party	Candidate	Votes	%	±%
Conservative	Charlie Dewhirst*	1,941	53.8	−3.7
Conservative	Jonathan Owen*	1,802	50.0	−3.1
Conservative	Denise Howard	1,653	45.8	−1.8
Labour	Judy Dickinson	862	23.9	+10.5
Labour	Bill Meadows	769	21.3	+7.9
Green	Mike Jackson	650	18.0	−13.3
Green	John Scullion	485	13.4	−6.0
Yorkshire	Peter Garforth	451	12.5	N/A
Liberal Democrats	David Butt	407	11.3	N/A
Liberal Democrats	Ellie Ripton	402	11.1	N/A
Liberal Democrats	David Hoskins	339	9.4	N/A
Registered electors		11,960		
Rejected ballots		14	0.4	
Turnout		3,606	30.15	−2.85
Conservative hold				
Conservative hold				
Conservative hold				

=== Goole North ===
Goole North (2 seats)
Party	Candidate	Votes	%	±%
Conservative	Anne Handley*	830	51.0	+4.5
Conservative	Nick Coultish*	807	49.6	+2.6
Labour	John Frost	426	26.2	−11.4
Labour	Iain Ball	387	23.8	−5.6
Liberal Democrats	Ray Kilcoyne	208	12.8	N/A
Liberal Democrats	Liam Moiser	168	10.3	N/A
Independent	Terry Fisher	161	9.9	N/A
Registered electors		8,227		
Rejected ballots		14	0.9	
Turnout		1,627	19.78	−9.52
Conservative hold				
Conservative hold				

=== Goole South ===
Goole South (2 seats)
Party	Candidate	Votes	%	±%
Independent	Barbara Jeffreys*	634	59.9	+8.3
Independent	David Jeffreys*	620	58.5	+14.5
Labour	Judi Armitage	362	34.2	+13.2
Labour	Jackie Huntington	309	29.2	+11.7
Liberal Democrats	Annie Nolan	47	4.4	N/A
Liberal Democrats	Tom Nolan	36	3.4	N/A
Registered electors		7,321		
Rejected ballots		10	0.9	
Turnout		1,059	14.47	−11.53
Independent hold				
Independent hold				

=== Hessle ===
Hessle (3 seats)
Party	Candidate	Votes	%	±%
Liberal Democrats	David Nolan*	1,414	43.8	−5.8
Liberal Democrats	Simon Pickering	1,376	42.6	−10.5
Liberal Democrats	John Bovill*	1,373	42.5	−6.7
Labour	Paul Toogood	1,207	37.4	+9.1
Labour	Sally Waters	1,196	37.0	+10.2
Labour	Janet Worrell	1,156	35.8	+8.2
Conservative	Christine Mackay	462	14.3	+1.4
Conservative	Daniel Bond	396	12.3	+0.6
Conservative	Michael Whitehead	364	11.3	−0.8
Registered electors		12,221		
Rejected ballots		34	1.1	
Turnout		3,231	26.44	−1.96
Liberal Democrats hold				
Liberal Democrats hold				
Liberal Democrats hold				

=== Howden ===
Howden (1 seat)
Party	Candidate	Votes	%	±%
Independent	David Howard	933	61.0	N/A
Liberal Democrats	Charlie Bayram*	245	16.0	−25.6
Conservative	Julian Hakes	227	14.8	−26.8
Labour	Julia Marten	124	8.1	−1.2
Registered electors		4,645		
Rejected ballots		3	0.2	
Turnout		1,531	32.96	−0.24
Independent gain from Conservative				

* Elected as a Conservative, but defected to the Liberal Democrats mid term

=== Howdenshire ===
Howdenshire (3 seats)
Party	Candidate	Votes	%	±%
Conservative	Victoria Aitken*	1,856	57.4	+3.0
Conservative	Linda Bayram*	1,593	49.3	+6.2
Conservative	Nigel Wilkinson*	1,438	44.5	+4.8
Labour	Stephen Clarke	913	28.3	+12.3
Labour	Nicola Booth	833	25.8	+11.2
Labour	Bernard Singleton	687	21.3	+7.6
Liberal Democrats	Matt Nolan	488	15.1	N/A
Liberal Democrats	Emma Dolman	469	14.5	N/A
Liberal Democrats	Richard Weighill	421	13.0	N/A
Registered electors		12,148		
Rejected ballots		35	1.1	
Turnout		3,231	26.60	−4.3
Conservative hold				
Conservative hold				
Conservative hold				

=== Mid Holderness ===
Mid Holderness (3 seats)
Party	Candidate	Votes	%	±%
Conservative	John Holtby*	1,481	45.3	+0.4
Conservative	Amanda Talbot	1,222	37.3	−1.2
Conservative	Samantha Whyte	1,194	36.5	+2.1
Liberal Democrats	Matthew Grove	1,161	35.5	+3.7
Liberal Democrats	Diana Hoskins	965	29.5	+15.1
Liberal Democrats	Paul Williams	958	29.3	N/A
Labour	Rachael Tomlinson	757	23.1	+5.1
Labour	Peter Welch	632	19.3	+3.4
Registered electors		11,066		
Rejected ballots		19	0.6	
Turnout		3,272	29.57	−2.13
Conservative hold				
Conservative hold				
Conservative hold				

=== Minster and Woodmansey ===
Minster and Woodmansey (3 seats)
Party	Candidate	Votes	%	±%
Liberal Democrats	Tom Astell	1,783	42.0	+16.5
Liberal Democrats	Peter Astell	1,764	41.5	+15.9
Liberal Democrats	Eliza Whitaker	1,603	37.8	+13.8
Conservative	David Elvidge*	1,137	26.8	−9.7
Labour	Ron Laden	1,137	26.8	−4.3
Labour	Margaret Pinder	1,131	26.6	−3.2
Conservative	Kerri Harold*	1,117	26.3	−6.0
Conservative	Harry Bulmer	1,104	26.0	−6.0
Labour	Tony Maione	996	23.5	−3.9
ADF	John Ottaway	182	4.3	N/A
Registered electors		13,304		
Rejected ballots		25	0.6	
Turnout		4,246	31.92	−2.28
Liberal Democrats gain from Conservative				
Liberal Democrats gain from Conservative				
Liberal Democrats gain from Conservative				

=== North Holderness ===
North Holderness (2 seats)
Party	Candidate	Votes	%	±%
Independent	Barbara Jefferson*	1,680	63.0	+20.5
Independent	John Whittle*	1,235	46.3	+11.0
Conservative	June Greensmith	818	30.7	+11.4
Labour	Brian Stockdale	274	10.3	+2.4
Green	Tessa Coombes	240	9.0	−2.7
Labour	Nidge Thornton	219	8.2	+1.6
Liberal Democrats	Chris Smith	200	7.5	+3.2
Liberal Democrats	John Rebecchi	70	2.6	N/A
Registered electors		8,406		
Rejected ballots		3	0.1	
Turnout		2,668	31.74	−4.26
Independent hold				
Independent hold				

=== Pocklington Provincial ===
Pocklington Provincial (3 seats)
Party	Candidate	Votes	%	±%
Liberal Democrats	Gareth Shepherd	1,991	38.9	N/A
Liberal Democrats	Andrew Cousins	1,864	36.4	N/A
Liberal Democrats	Dale Needham	1,653	32.3	N/A
Conservative	Andy Burton	1,552	30.3	−3.9
Conservative	Kay West*	1,424	27.8	−8.4
Labour	Richard Bryon	1,185	23.1	+1.2
Labour	Dafydd Ap-Williams	1,108	21.6	+4.2
Labour	Liam Draycott	965	18.8	N/A
Independent	Andy Strangeway	710	13.9	−14.0
Green	Ged Leach	658	12.8	−7.7
Green	Peter McClymont	347	6.8	−9.3
TUSC	Steve Scott	117	2.3	N/A
Registered electors		15,280		
Rejected ballots		23	0.4	
Turnout		5,124	33.53	+1.23
Liberal Democrats gain from Conservative				
Liberal Democrats gain from Conservative				
Liberal Democrats gain from Conservative				

=== Snaith, Airmyn and Rawcliffe and Marshland ===
Snaith, Airmyn and Rawcliffe and Marshland (2 seats)
Party	Candidate	Votes	%	±%
Conservative	Caroline Fox*	1,185	56.9	−10.3
Conservative	Liz Sargeantson*	1,080	51.8	−9.4
Labour	Ann Gilbert	527	25.3	+0.7
Independent	Shona Wade	425	20.4	N/A
TUSC	Andy Hiles	159	7.6	N/A
Liberal Democrats	Tom Codling	158	7.6	N/A
Liberal Democrats	Shaun Chaplin	152	7.3	N/A
Registered electors		7,868		
Rejected ballots		7	0.3	
Turnout		2,083	26.47	−7.33
Conservative hold				
Conservative hold				

=== South East Holderness ===
South East Holderness (3 seats)
Party	Candidate	Votes	%	±%
Conservative	Lyn Healing*	1,312	46.4	−6.1
Conservative	Claire Holmes*	1,215	43.0	−3.9
Conservative	Sean McMaster	903	31.9	−11.3
Labour	Ian Blackburn	796	28.2	−0.6
Labour	Martin Devanney	731	25.9	+0.6
Reform	Jon Dimberline	631	22.3	N/A
Yorkshire	Ricky Hoggard	605	21.4	N/A
Liberal Democrats	Cheryl Giles	406	14.4	+0.8
Liberal Democrats	Daniel Whitaker	283	10.0	−2.7
Liberal Democrats	Alan Luckraft	248	8.8	N/A
Registered electors		11,399		
Rejected ballots		11	0.4	
Turnout		2,827	24.8	−2.1
Conservative hold				
Conservative hold				
Conservative hold				

=== South Hunsley ===
South Hunsley (2 seats)
Party	Candidate	Votes	%	±%
Liberal Democrats	Margaret Corless*	1,449	47.0	+32.9
Conservative	Paul Hopton	1,274	41.4	−26.4
Liberal Democrats	Sandra Mills	1,172	38.1	+24.9
Conservative	Soraya Hutchinson	1,045	33.9	−23.8
Green	Duncan Ross	292	9.5	N/A
Green	Stewart Arnold	238	7.7	N/A
Labour	Dafydd Taylor	230	7.5	−4.2
Labour	Mark Ward	175	5.7	−3.9
Registered electors		8,568		
Rejected ballots		12	0.4	
Turnout		3,080	36.0	+1.2
Liberal Democrats gain from Conservative				
Conservative hold				

=== South West Holderness ===
South West Holderness (3 seats)
Party	Candidate	Votes	%	±%
Conservative	John Dennis*	1,263	46.3	+0.9
Labour	Steve Gallant	1,125	41.2	+14.7
Conservative	Sue Steel*	1,096	40.2	+1.7
Labour	Colin Billany	1,069	39.2	+11.3
Conservative	David Winter*	1,057	38.7	−1.5
Labour	Elisha Heslop	1,023	37.5	+17.7
Liberal Democrats	Abigail Bell	363	13.3	+1.8
Liberal Democrats	Stewart Willie	319	11.7	N/A
Liberal Democrats	David Tucker	268	9.8	N/A
Registered electors		11,274		
Rejected ballots		19	0.7	
Turnout		2,729	24.2	−1.7
Conservative hold				
Labour gain from Conservative				
Conservative hold				

=== St Mary's ===
St Mary's (3 seats)
Party	Candidate	Votes	%	±%
Liberal Democrats	Linda Johnson*	2,832	58.0	+8.5
Liberal Democrats	Denis Healy*	2,819	57.7	+2.8
Liberal Democrats	David Boynton*	2,739	56.1	+7.1
Conservative	Elaine Aird	1,309	26.8	−0.2
Conservative	Bethany Needham	1,184	24.2	+0.1
Conservative	Peter Stevens	1,162	23.8	+1.1
Labour	Jim Whitfield	803	16.4	+5.0
Labour	Ann Willis	775	15.9	+5.2
Registered electors		12,672		
Rejected ballots		23	0.5	
Turnout		4,883	38.5	−4.2
Liberal Democrats hold				
Liberal Democrats hold				
Liberal Democrats hold				

=== Tranby ===
Tranby (2 seats)
Party	Candidate	Votes	%	±%
Liberal Democrats	Viv Padden*	1,207	55.7	+13.7
Liberal Democrats	Margot Sutton*	1,115	51.5	+10.5
Labour	Chay Bell	496	22.9	N/A
Conservative	Waqar Khan	467	21.6	−13.8
Labour	Barrie Green	423	19.5	+6.0
Green	Jane Robinson	201	9.3	N/A
Registered electors		8,148		
Rejected ballots		13	0.6	
Turnout		2,167	26.6	−4.7
Liberal Democrats hold				
Liberal Democrats hold				

=== Willerby and Kirk Ella ===
Willerby and Kirk Ella (3 seats)
Party	Candidate	Votes	%	±%
Conservative	Gary McMaster*	1,606	50.7	+0.1
Conservative	Zahra Saribal	1,432	45.2	−6.5
Conservative	David Tucker	1,346	42.5	−8.0
Labour	Roger Coates	823	26.0	+10.8
Liberal Democrats	Pat Ellis	775	24.4	+8.9
Labour	Jane Redpath	761	24.0	+11.5
Labour	Malcolm Stather	732	23.1	+11.7
Liberal Democrats	Tony McCobb	724	22.8	+7.7
Liberal Democrats	Lilian McCobb	722	22.8	+8.9
Registered electors		10,950		
Rejected ballots		21	0.7	
Turnout		3,170	29.0	−3.1
Conservative hold				
Conservative hold				
Conservative hold				

=== Wolds Weighton ===
Wolds Weighton (3 seats)
Party	Candidate	Votes	%	±%
Conservative	Leo Hammond*	2,019	47.2	+4.2
Conservative	Derek Cary	1,612	37.7	−10.2
Conservative	Paul West	1,385	32.4	−15.1
Yorkshire	Peter Hemmerman	1,033	24.1	−7.6
Labour	Bridget Cooper	825	19.3	+0.2
Independent	Mike Stathers*	801	18.7	−28.8
Labour	Mike Cooper	757	17.7	−1.0
Green	Gill Leek	757	17.7	N/A
Independent	Catherine Simpson	725	16.9	N/A
Liberal Democrats	Gill Healy	586	13.7	−7.9
Liberal Democrats	Chris Healy	521	12.2	N/A
Liberal Democrats	Bob Morgan	418	9.8	N/A
Registered electors		12,955		
Rejected ballots		13	0.3	
Turnout		4,278	33.0	−1.8
Conservative hold				
Conservative hold				
Conservative hold				

== Changes 2023–2027 ==
- David Nolan, elected as a Liberal Democrat in 2023, joined Labour in January 2024. Nolan resigned from Labour in September 2025, in opposition to the government's identity card plans, and said he intended to sit as an independent.
- Maria Bowtell, elected as a Conservative in 2023, joined Reform UK in February 2024. Bowtell proceeded to resign from Reform UK in March 2025, and later joined Restore Britain in February 2026, becoming their first councillor nationally.
- Caroline Fox, elected as a Conservative, left the party in May 2024 to sit as an independent.
- Samantha Whyte (later Samantha Christon-Whyte), elected as a Conservative in 2023, left the party to sit as an independent, before joining Reform UK on 26 February 2026.
- Andy Walker and Tim Norman, both elected for the Yorkshire Party in 2023, left the party in July 2025 to form East Riding Council's first Green Party group; their Bridlington South ward colleague Rick Arrand also left the Yorkshire Party at the same time but sits as an independent.
- Denise Howard, elected as a Conservative in 2023, defected to Reform UK in October 2025.

=== By-elections ===
==== Minster and Woodmansey ====
Minster and Woodmansey by-election: 29 February 2024
Party	Candidate	Votes	%	±%
Liberal Democrats	Tony Henderson	1,438	50.7	+9
Conservative	David Keith Elvidge	706	24.9	−4
Labour	Ron Laden	495	17.4	−12
Green	Jonathan Stephenson	198	7.0	New
Majority		732	25.8	
Registered electors		13,543		
Rejected ballots		17	0.6	
Turnout		2,854	21.1	−10.8
Liberal Democrats hold		Swing	+6.5	

The by-election followed the death of the sitting Liberal Democrat councillor, Peter Astell, a former mayor of Beverley first elected to the ward in May 2023, who died suddenly on 3 December 2023.

==== Tranby ====
Tranby by-election, 29 February 2024
Party	Candidate	Votes	%	±%
Liberal Democrats	Ross Douglas Harrison	958	55.3	+4.1
Labour	Malcolm Stather	408	23.6	+3.1
Conservative	Michael Whitehead	268	15.5	+3.7
Green	Jane Nicola Robinson	97	5.6	−2.5
Majority		550	31.7	
Registered electors		8,045		
Rejected ballots		6	0.3	
Turnout		1,737	21.6	−5.0
Liberal Democrats hold		Swing	+0.5	

The by-election followed the death of the sitting Liberal Democrat councillor, Viv Padden, who died on the same day as Astell, 3 December 2023, after an illness resulting from a stroke.

==== East Wolds and Coastal ====
East Wolds and Coastal by-election, 4 July 2024
Party	Candidate	Votes	%	±%
Conservative	Jonathan Colin Bibb	3,105	41.6	−12.2
Liberal Democrats	Gary Lugg	1,823	24.5	+13.2
Labour	Mike Dixon	1,144	15.3	−8.6
Yorkshire	Peter Garforth	634	8.5	−4.0
Green	Jane Elizabeth Lloyd	451	6.1	−11.9
Independent	Andrew Frost	300	4.0	New
Majority		1,282	20.1	
Registered electors		12,043		
Rejected ballots		10	0.1	
Turnout		7,548	62.68	+32.53
Conservative hold		Swing	-12.7	

The by-election followed the resignation of the sitting Conservative councillor, Charlie Dewhirst, who stood down in June 2024 ahead of his election, on the same day as the by-election, as Member of Parliament for Bridlington and The Wolds.

==== South East Holderness ====
South East Holderness by-election, 4 July 2024
Party	Candidate	Votes	%	±%
Reform	Jon Dimberline	2,027	34.8	+12.5
Conservative	David Winter	1,755	30.1	−16.3
Labour	Ian Blackburn	1,550	26.6	−1.6
Liberal Democrats	Matthew Grove	498	8.5	−5.9
Majority		272	4.7	
Registered electors		11,357		
Rejected ballots		4	0.1	
Turnout		5,859	51.6	+28.8
Reform gain from Conservative		Swing	+14.4	

The by-election followed the resignation of the sitting Conservative councillor, Claire Holmes.
