= 2019 East Riding of Yorkshire Council election =

2019 local election in England

- 2 May 2019

All 67 seats to East Riding of Yorkshire Council 34 seats needed for a majority
	First party	Second party	Third party
	Con	LD	Ind
Party	Conservative	Liberal Democrats	Independent
Last election	51 seats, 37.1%	2 seats, 9.9%	5 seats, 8.7%
Seats won	49	8	8
Seat change	▼2	▲6	▲3
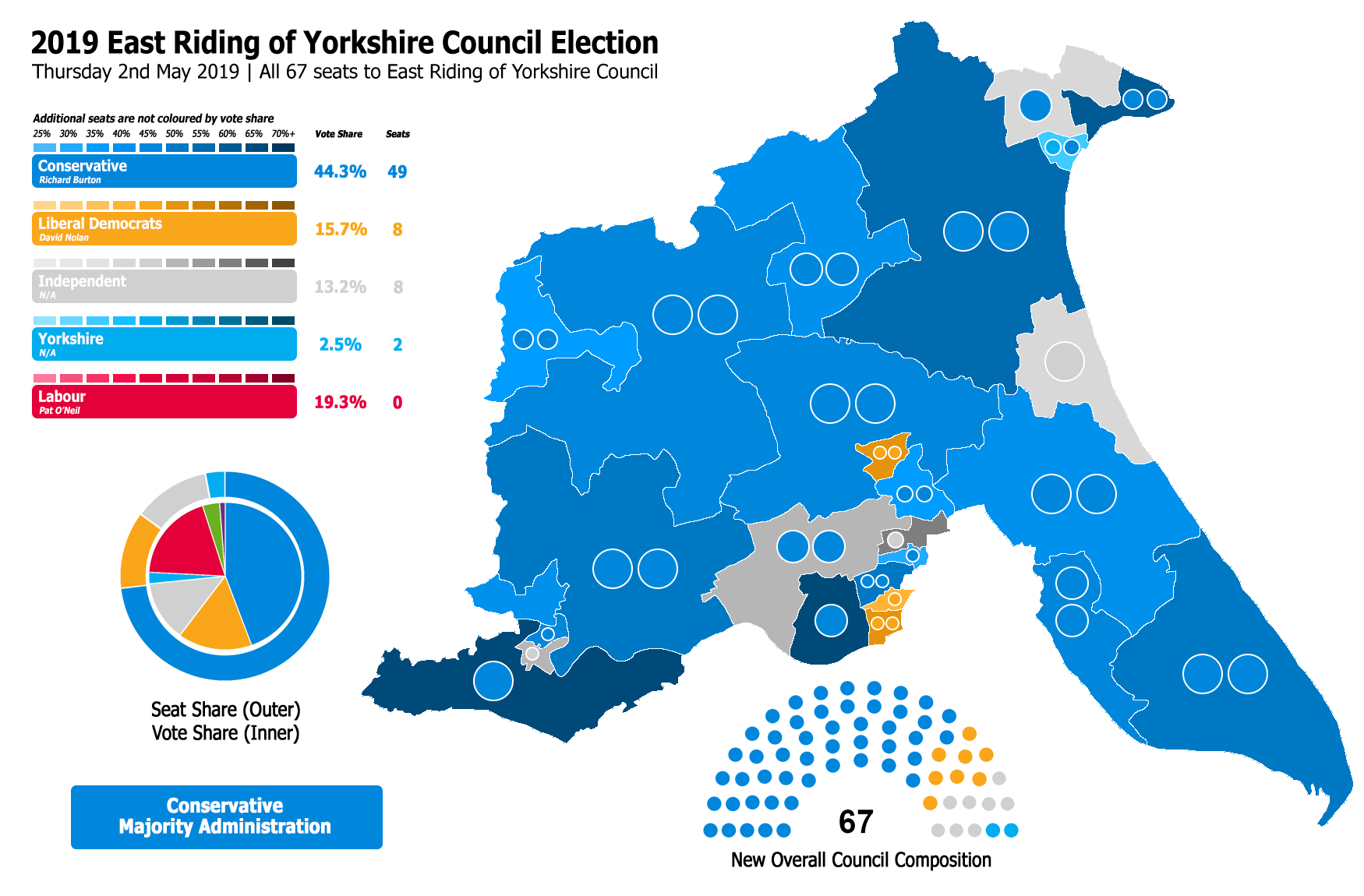
- Map of the results of the election. Colours denote the winning party, as shown in the main table of results.

The 2019 East Riding of Yorkshire Council election took place on 2 May 2019 to elect all 67 members of East Riding of Yorkshire Council in England. This was on the same day as other local elections. The whole of the council was up for election and the Conservative Party retained control of the council.

== Summary ==
=== Election result ===
2019 East Riding of Yorkshire Council election
Party	Candidates	Seats	Gains	Losses	Net gain/loss	Seats %	Votes %	Votes	+/−
Conservative	61	49	3	5	▼2	73.1	44.3	86,499	–1.7
Liberal Democrats	36	8	6	0	▲6	11.9	15.7	30,604	+7.2
Independent	28	8	4	1	▲3	11.9	13.2	25,776	+7.5
Yorkshire	6	2	2	0	▲2	3.0	2.5	4,965	+2.4
Labour	61	0	0	6	▼6	0.0	19.3	37,640	–6.7
Green	9	0	0	0	Steady	0.0	3.6	7,023	+2.6
UKIP	5	0	0	3	▼3	0.0	1.2	2,356	–10.0
Democrats and Veterans	1	0	0	0	Steady	0.0	0.2	399	N/A

== Ward results ==
=== Beverley Rural ===
Beverley Rural
Party	Candidate	Votes	%	±%
Conservative	Pauline Greenwood	2,003	49.7	
Conservative	Bernard Gateshill	1,925	47.7	
Conservative	Kevin Beaumont	1,817	45.1	
Liberal Democrats	Alison Healy	1,055	26.2	
Liberal Democrats	Diana Stewart	968	24.0	
Green	Philip Grimes	916	22.7	
Liberal Democrats	Hamish Stewart	776	19.2	
Labour	Chloe Hopkins	525	13.0	
Labour	Cherry Walton	461	11.4	
Labour	James Whitfield	417	10.3	
Turnout		4,033	36.5	
Conservative hold				
Conservative hold				
Conservative hold				

=== Bridlington Central and Old Town ===
Bridlington Central and Old Town
Party	Candidate	Votes	%	±%
Independent	Liam Dealtry	884	42.2	
Conservative	Richard Burton	764	36.5	
Independent	Alan Felber	426	20.3	
Labour	Mike Dixon	390	18.6	
Labour	Margaret Pinder	361	17.2	
Independent	Malcolm Milns	355	17.0	
Liberal Democrats	Mike Heslop-Mullens	199	9.5	
Turnout		2,094	25.5	
Independent gain from UKIP				
Conservative hold				

=== Bridlington North ===
Bridlington North
Party	Candidate	Votes	%	±%
Conservative	Chris Matthews	2,101	61.8	
Conservative	Richard Harrap	2,050	60.3	
Conservative	Chad Chadwick	1,929	56.8	
Labour	Jan Davis	855	25.2	
Turnout		3,397	29.4	
Conservative hold				
Conservative hold				
Conservative gain from UKIP				

=== Bridlington South ===
Bridlington South
Party	Candidate	Votes	%	±%
Yorkshire	Tim Norman	907	35.5	
Yorkshire	Andy Walker	904	35.3	
Conservative	John Copsey	742	29.0	
Labour	Shelagh Finlay	698	27.3	
Conservative	J Wilson	642	25.1	
Independent	Thelma Milns	636	24.9	
Labour	Colin Croft	561	21.9	
Independent	David Robson	543	21.2	
Labour	Chris Sutton	533	20.8	
Turnout		2,558	24.0	
Yorkshire gain from UKIP				
Yorkshire gain from Labour				
Conservative hold				

=== Cottingham North ===
Cottingham North
Party	Candidate	Votes	%	±%
Independent	Ros Jump	1,450	61.8	
Independent	Geraldine Mathieson	1,338	57.0	
Conservative	Dylan Medini	352	15.0	
Conservative	James Chapman	342	14.6	
Labour	Julia Marten	338	14.4	
Labour	Mark Ward	329	14.0	
Liberal Democrats	Frank Beill	174	7.4	
Liberal Democrats	Alan Hindley	168	7.2	
Turnout		2,347	35.4	
Independent hold				
Independent hold				

=== Cottingham South ===
Cottingham South
Party	Candidate	Votes	%	±%
Conservative	Helen Green	833	33.9	
Conservative	Mike Medini	796	32.4	
Labour	Alex Duke	649	26.4	
Labour	Sam Kind	559	22.8	
Independent	Kevin Casson	531	21.6	
Liberal Democrats	Phillip Redshaw	350	14.3	
Liberal Democrats	Richard Weighill	315	12.8	
UKIP	Andy Hargreaves	273	11.1	
UKIP	Alan Williams	231	9.4	
Turnout		2,454	33.4	
Conservative hold				
Conservative hold				

=== Dale ===
Dale
Party	Candidate	Votes	%	±%
Independent	Terry Gill	2,511	53.9	
Conservative	Pat Smith	2,033	43.7	
Conservative	Richard Meredith	1,974	42.4	
Conservative	Phil Scaife	1,907	41.0	
Liberal Democrats	Alan Luckraft	903	19.4	
Liberal Democrats	Patricia Jones	777	16.7	
Labour	Judy Dickinson	623	13.4	
Labour	Ann Wordingham	529	11.4	
Turnout		4,656	34.2	
Independent gain from Conservative				
Conservative hold				
Conservative hold				

=== Driffield and Rural ===
Driffield and Rural
Party	Candidate	Votes	%	±%
Conservative	Felicity Temple	1,370	41.1	
Conservative	Matt Rogers	1,300	39.0	
Conservative	Michael Lee	1,178	35.3	
Independent	Mark Blakeston	982	29.4	
Independent	Maureen Steward	691	20.7	
Labour	Tom Watson	658	19.7	
Labour	Jan Blyton	585	17.5	
Independent	Kevin Mcleod	569	17.1	
Labour	William Meadows	561	16.8	
Yorkshire	Terry Walls	410	12.3	
Liberal Democrats	Richard Gorski	329	9.9	
Liberal Democrats	Geoffrey Ormerod	265	7.9	
Liberal Democrats	Grace Gorski	258	7.7	
Turnout		3,336	28.1	
Conservative hold				
Conservative hold				
Conservative hold				

=== East Wolds and Coastal ===
East Wolds and Coastal
Party	Candidate	Votes	%	±%
Conservative	Jane Evison	2,242	57.5	
Conservative	Jonathan Owen	2,072	53.1	
Conservative	William Lisseter	1,856	47.6	
Green	Mike Jackson	1,222	31.3	
Green	Ollie Smith	928	23.8	
Green	John Scullion	757	19.4	
Labour	Daniel Vulliamy	522	13.4	
Labour	Wendy Cross	522	13.4	
Turnout		3,900	33.0	
Conservative hold				
Conservative hold				
Conservative hold				

=== Goole North ===
Goole North
Party	Candidate	Votes	%	±%
Conservative	Nick Coultish	1,156	47.0	
Conservative	Anne Handley	1,142	46.5	
Labour	Keith Moore	923	37.6	
Labour	Richard Walker	723	29.4	
Turnout		2,458	29.3	
Conservative gain from Labour				
Conservative gain from Independent				

=== Goole South ===
Goole South
Party	Candidate	Votes	%	±%
Independent	Barbara Jeffreys	960	51.6	
Independent	David Jeffreys	819	44.0	
Independent	Sid Gilroy-Simpson	680	36.5	
Labour	Mally Boatman	390	21.0	
Labour	Pat O'Neil	326	17.5	
Turnout		1,861	26.0	
Independent gain from Labour				
Independent gain from Labour				

=== Hessle ===
Hessle
Party	Candidate	Votes	%	±%
Liberal Democrats	Philip Davison	1,756	53.1	
Liberal Democrats	David Nolan	1,640	49.6	
Liberal Democrats	John Bovill	1,628	49.2	
Labour	Paul Hogan	934	28.3	
Labour	Janet Worrell	911	27.6	
Labour	Iain Billinger	887	26.8	
Conservative	Christine Mackay	425	12.9	
Conservative	Ryan Jacobsz	400	12.1	
Conservative	Daniel Bond	386	11.7	
Independent	Phil Withers	376	11.4	
Turnout		3,306	28.4	
Liberal Democrats hold				
Liberal Democrats gain from Labour				
Liberal Democrats gain from Labour				

=== Howden ===
Howden
Party	Candidate	Votes	%	±%
Conservative	Charlie Bayram (Note: On 14 May 2022, Bayram, crossed the floor to sit as a Liberal Democrat.)	556	41.6	
Green	Angela Stone	512	38.3	
Liberal Democrats	Emma Dolman	144	10.8	
Labour	Billy Bell	125	9.3	
Majority				
Turnout		1,364	33.2	
Conservative hold		Swing		

=== Howdenshire ===
Howdenshire
Party	Candidate	Votes	%	±%
Conservative	Victoria Aitken	2,025	54.4	
Conservative	Linda Bayram	1,602	43.1	
Conservative	Nigel Wilkinson	1,479	39.7	
UKIP	Jane Collins	880	23.6	
Independent	David Kite	861	23.1	
UKIP	Mary Hook	676	18.2	
Labour	David Aldred	594	16.0	
Labour	Mike Whitley	544	14.6	
Labour	Bernard Singleton	508	13.7	
Turnout		3,721	30.9	
Conservative hold				
Conservative hold				
Conservative hold				

=== Mid Holderness ===
Mid Holderness
Party	Candidate	Votes	%	±%
Conservative	John Holtby	1,592	44.9	
Conservative	Jacob Birch	1,368	38.5	
Conservative	Brian Skow	1,221	34.4	
Independent	Matthew Grove	1,128	31.8	
Yorkshire	Andy Shead	862	24.3	
Labour	Jayne Birkett	638	18.0	
Labour	James Ireland	563	15.9	
Labour	Colin Stoneman	550	15.5	
Liberal Democrats	Eliza Whitaker	510	14.4	
Turnout		3,549	31.7	
Conservative hold				
Conservative hold				
Conservative hold				

=== Minster and Woodmansey ===
Minster and Woodmansey
Party	Candidate	Votes	%	±%
Conservative	David Elvidge	1,584	36.5	
Conservative	Kerri Harold	1,401	32.3	
Conservative	Paul Nickerson	1,390	32.0	
Labour	Clare Wildey	1,350	31.1	
Labour	Ann Willis	1,292	29.8	
Labour	George McManus	1,188	27.4	
Liberal Democrats	Peter Astell	1,112	25.6	
Liberal Democrats	Tom Astell	1,106	25.5	
Liberal Democrats	Bob Morgan	1,042	24.0	
Turnout		4,340	34.2	
Conservative hold				
Conservative hold				
Conservative hold				

=== North Holderness ===
North Holderness
Party	Candidate	Votes	%	±%
Independent	Barbara Jefferson	1,287	42.5	
Independent	John Whittle	1,067	35.3	
Independent	Tim Bunch	1,032	34.1	
Conservative	Stuart Addy	583	19.3	
Yorkshire	Lee Walton	477	15.8	
Green	Paul Davey	355	11.7	
Labour	Brian Stockdale	239	7.9	
Labour	Nidge Thornton	200	6.6	
Liberal Democrats	Graham Johnson	130	4.3	
Turnout		3,025	36.0	
Independent hold				
Independent hold				

=== Pocklington Provincial ===
Pocklington Provincial
Party	Candidate	Votes	%	±%
Conservative	Kay West	1,602	36.2	
Conservative	David Sykes	1,512	34.2	
Conservative	Paul West	1,247	28.2	
Independent	Andy Strangeway	1,233	27.9	
Independent	Dee Sharpe	995	22.5	
Independent	Iris Madden	972	22.0	
Labour	Richard Byron	968	21.9	
Green	Pauline Fothergill	907	20.5	
Independent	Ruth Strangeway	800	18.1	
Labour	Catherine Minns	769	17.4	
Green	Peter Ingram	713	16.1	
Turnout		4,421	32.3	
Conservative hold				
Conservative hold				
Conservative hold				

=== Snaith, Airmyn and Rawcliffe and Marshland ===
Snaith, Airmyn and Rawcliffe and Marshland
Party	Candidate	Votes	%	±%
Conservative	Caroline Fox	1,771	67.2	
Conservative	Liz Sargeantson	1,611	61.2	
Labour	Laura Dean	648	24.6	
Labour	Lee Rogers	544	20.7	
Turnout		2,634	33.8	
Conservative hold				
Conservative hold				

=== South East Holderness ===
South East Holderness
Party	Candidate	Votes	%	±%
Conservative	Lyn Healing	1,631	52.5	
Conservative	David Tucker	1,457	46.9	
Conservative	Paul Whitehead	1,342	43.2	
Labour	Ian Blackburn	895	28.8	
Labour	Martin Devanney	785	25.3	
Labour	Nicola Regan	782	25.2	
Liberal Democrats	Judy Jones	423	13.6	
Liberal Democrats	David Horsley	394	12.7	
Turnout		3,104	26.9	
Conservative hold				
Conservative hold				
Conservative hold				

=== South Hunsley ===
South Hunsley
Party	Candidate	Votes	%	±%
Conservative	Julie Abraham	1,947	67.8	
Conservative	Vanessa Walker	1,656	57.7	
Liberal Democrats	Matt Nolan	406	14.1	
Liberal Democrats	Tom Nolan	378	13.2	
Labour	Dafydd Taylor	335	11.7	
UKIP	James May	296	10.3	
Labour	Adrian Duke	276	9.6	
Turnout		2,870	34.8	
Conservative hold				
Conservative hold				

=== South West Holderness ===
South West Holderness
Party	Candidate	Votes	%	±%
Conservative	John Dennis	1,359	45.4	
Conservative	Mike Bryan	1,203	40.2	
Conservative	Sue Steel	1,152	38.5	
Independent	James Baron	889	29.7	
Labour	Neil Black	836	27.9	
Labour	Steve Gallant	792	26.5	
Labour	Dave Langcaster	593	19.8	
Liberal Democrats	Simon Rance	344	11.5	
Turnout		2,992	25.9	
Conservative hold				
Conservative hold				
Conservative hold				

=== St. Mary's ===
St. Mary's
Party	Candidate	Votes	%	±%
Liberal Democrats	Denis Healy	3,036	54.9	
Liberal Democrats	Linda Johnson	2,739	49.5	
Liberal Democrats	David Boynton	2,713	49.0	
Conservative	Elaine Aird	1,492	27.0	
Conservative	Walter Sweeney	1,331	24.1	
Conservative	Peter Stevens	1,254	22.7	
Green	Michael Farman	713	12.9	
Labour	Robert Armstrong	629	11.4	
Labour	Richard Boal	590	10.7	
Labour	Ann Gilbert	577	10.4	
Democrats and Veterans	Thomas Flynn	399	7.2	
Turnout		5,534	42.7	
Liberal Democrats gain from Conservative				
Liberal Democrats gain from Conservative				
Liberal Democrats gain from Conservative				

=== Tranby ===
Tranby
Party	Candidate	Votes	%	±%
Liberal Democrats	Viv Padden	1,034	42.0	
Liberal Democrats	Margot Sutton	1,008	41.0	
Conservative	Craig Ulliott	872	35.4	
Independent	Graham Bate	678	27.5	
Labour	Barrie Green	332	13.5	
Turnout		2,461	31.3	
Liberal Democrats hold				
Liberal Democrats gain from Conservative				

=== Willerby and Kirk Ella ===
Willerby and Kirk Ella
Party	Candidate	Votes	%	±%
Conservative	Ben Weeks	1,820	51.7	
Conservative	Gary McMaster	1,781	50.6	
Conservative	Shaun Horton	1,778	50.5	
Independent	Michael Whitehead	1,083	30.7	
Liberal Democrats	Pat Ellis	546	15.5	
Labour	Roger Coates	534	15.2	
Liberal Democrats	Tony McCobb	532	15.1	
Liberal Democrats	Lillian McCobb	489	13.9	
Labour	Chay Bell	441	12.5	
Labour	Stephanie Haywood	401	11.4	
Turnout		3,523	32.1	
Conservative hold				
Conservative hold				
Conservative hold				

=== Wolds Weighton ===
Wolds Weighton
Party	Candidate	Votes	%	±%
Conservative	David Rudd	2,126	47.9	
Conservative	Mike Stathers	2,107	47.5	
Conservative	Leo Hammond	1,910	43.0	
Yorkshire	Peter Hemmerman	1,405	31.7	
Liberal Democrats	Dale Needham	957	21.6	
Labour	Katherine Lovett	849	19.1	
Labour	Andrew Boothroyd	828	18.7	
Labour	Andrew Lovett	675	15.2	
Turnout		4,439	34.8	
Conservative hold				
Conservative hold				
Conservative hold				

== Changes 2019–2023 ==
=== Affiliation changes ===
- 14 May 2022: Charlie Bayram (Howden) left the Conservatives and joined the Liberal Democrats, citing concerns about how the council was being run.
- 18 July 2022: Mike Stathers (Wolds Weighton) left the Conservatives to sit as an independent.

=== By-elections ===
==== Bridlington North ====
Bridlington North by-election, 11 July 2019
Party	Candidate	Votes	%	±%
Liberal Democrats	Mike Heslop-Mullens	1,308	42.7	N/A
Conservative	Martin Burnhill	815	26.6	−33.7
Yorkshire	Paul Walker	349	11.4	N/A
UKIP	Gary Shores	196	6.4	N/A
Labour	Mike Dixon	135	4.4	−20.8
Independent	Terry Dixon	125	4.1	N/A
Independent	David Robson	76	2.5	N/A
Independent	Thelma Milns	58	1.9	N/A
Majority		493	16.1	−19.0
Turnout		3,072	26.7	−2.7
Liberal Democrats gain from Conservative		Swing	+38.2	

The by-election followed the death of Conservative councillor Richard Harrap.

==== South East Holderness ====
South East Holderness by-election, 6 May 2021
Party	Candidate	Votes	%	±%
Conservative	Claire Holmes	1,624	52.1	+8.9
Liberal Democrats	Dave Edwards	691	22.2	+8.6
Labour	James Ireland	396	12.7	−16.1
Yorkshire	Ricky Hoggard	317	10.2	N/A
Reform	Rich Kelly	89	2.9	N/A
Majority		933	29.9	+15.5
Turnout		3,143	27.6	+0.7
Conservative hold		Swing	+0.2	

The South East Holderness by-election was held after Conservative councillor Paul Whitehead's seat became vacant.

==== South West Holderness ====
South West Holderness by-election, 6 May 2021
Party	Candidate	Votes	%	±%
Conservative	David Winter	1,304	39.9	−0.3
Labour	Steve Gallant	814	24.9	−1.9
Liberal Democrats	Matthew Grove	626	19.1	+7.6
Independent	James Baron	525	16.1	−13.6
Majority		490	15.0	+1.3
Turnout		3,282	28.8	+2.9
Conservative hold		Swing	+0.8	

The by-election followed the death of Conservative councillor Mike Bryan.

==== East Wolds and Coastal ====
East Wolds and Coastal by-election, 19 August 2021
Party	Candidate	Votes	%	±%
Conservative	Charles Dewhirst	1,190	54.0	+6.4
Labour	Daniel Vulliamy	447	20.3	+6.9
Yorkshire	Kimberley-Nicholle Thomas	347	15.7	N/A
Green	John Scullon	142	6.4	−13.0
Liberal Democrats	Peter Astell	79	3.6	N/A
Majority		743	33.7	+17.4
Turnout		2,209	18.4	−14.6
Conservative hold		Swing	▼0.3	

The by-election followed the death of Conservative councillor Paul Lisseter.

==== South Hunsley ====
South Hunsley by-election, 7 April 2022
Party	Candidate	Votes	%	±%
Liberal Democrats	Margaret Corless	1,351	54.7	+41.1
Conservative	Paul Hoption	907	36.8	−28.5
Labour	Dafydd Taylor	110	4.5	−6.8
Green	Stewart Arnold	100	4.1	N/A
Majority		444	17.9	
Turnout		2,472	29.4	
Liberal Democrats gain from Conservative		Swing	▲34.8	

The by-election followed the death of Conservative councillor Vanessa Walker.

==== Bridlington North ====
Bridlington North by-election, 30 June 2022
Party	Candidate	Votes	%	±%
Liberal Democrats	Jayne Phoenix	1,950	57.1	+14.4
Conservative	Jonathan Bibb	1,077	31.5	+4.9
Labour	David Butland	171	5.0	+0.6
SDP	Carlo Verda	125	3.7	N/A
Yorkshire	Kimberley Thomas	93	2.7	−8.7
Majority		873	25.6	+9.5
Turnout		3,422	30.1	+3.4
Liberal Democrats gain from Conservative		Swing	▲4.8	

The by-election followed the death of Conservative councillor Chad Chadwick.

==== Beverley Rural ====
Beverley Rural by-election, 25 August 2022
Party	Candidate	Votes	%	±%
Liberal Democrats	Diana Stewart	1,948	59.4	+33.2
Conservative	Peter Stevens	1,116	34.1	−15.6
Labour	Clare Wildey	213	6.5	−6.5
Majority		832	25.3	
Turnout		3,294	29.2	−7.3
Liberal Democrats gain from Conservative		Swing	▲24.4	

The by-election followed the death of Conservative councillor Pauline Greenwood.
