= 2007 East Riding of Yorkshire Council election =

2007 local election in England

Results of the 2007 East Riding of Yorkshire Council election

The 2007 East Riding of Yorkshire Council election took place on 3 May 2007 to elect members of East Riding of Yorkshire Council in England. This was on the same day as other local elections.

The Conservative Party gained a majority of seats, including those of the Liberal Democrats and Labour Party leaders.

== Result summary ==
East Riding of Yorkshire Council Election Result 2007
Party	Seats	Gains	Losses	Net gain/loss	Seats %	Votes %	Votes	+/−
Conservative	47	18	0	+18	69.1	46.7	111,272	
Liberal Democrats	12	0	10	-10	17.6	28.6	68,149	
Labour	3	0	5	-5	4.4	13.4	32,051	
Independent	5	0	3	-3	7.4	7.0	16,791	
SDP	1	0	1	-1	1.5	1.5	3,453	
BNP	0	0	0	0	0.0	1.2	2,736	
Green	0	0	0	0	0.0	0.8	1,821	
English Democrat	0	0	0	0	0.0	0.5	1,156	
