= Andy Strangeway =

British decorator

Andy Strangeway (born 1965 in Londesborough, East Riding of Yorkshire) is an adventurer from the Yorkshire Wolds. He has landed and slept on all 162 of Scotland's islands of 100 acres (40 hectares) and above. He completed this challenge on 29 August 2007 after landing on Soay, St. Kilda the day before.

On Saturday 8 August 2009, upon landing Out Stack, Strangeway claimed to be the first person to land the four extreme points of Scotland. However, as he has not yet landed on Rockall, this claim is disputed. On 10 May 2010, Strangeway claimed to have successfully applied for the first ever planning permission for Rockall to replace the Queen's plaque. He intended to do this 2011 but abandoned the trip. However, Tom McClean had in fact applied successfully for consent for his temporary shelter in 1985.

Upon landing and sleeping on the southerly point of Yorkshire on 5/6 February 2011 Strangeway became the first person not only to sleep on the summits of the three Ridings but also the first person to sleep on the seven extreme points of Yorkshire. On 31 August 2011 Strangeway became the first person to sleep at each of the six extreme points of Great Britain solo on consecutive nights. In September 2012, he became the first person to sleep on the summit of all 52 counties of England and Wales.

Strangeway is an access rights campaigner. In June 2012, he successfully campaigned for the removal of 69 No Overnight Parking signs on trunk roads in the Highlands. He followed this in September 2012 by successfully campaigning for an estimated 250 No Overnight Parking signs to be removed from non-trunk roads across the Highlands.

On 7 May 2015, Strangeway stood as the UK Independence Party candidate for the Wolds Weighton ward of East Riding of Yorkshire Council, finishing fourth in the three-member ward with 1,915 votes. As an independent candidate, he was elected for the Pocklington Provincial ward in a by-election on 7 April 2016. Standing in the May 2019 election, he lost his place and is no longer a councillor.
