= East Riding of Yorkshire Council =

Local authority of the East Riding of Yorkshire

East Riding of Yorkshire

Type
- Type: Unitary authority

History
- Founded: 1 April 1996

Leadership
- Chair: Linda Johnson, Liberal Democrats since 14 May 2026
- Leader: Anne Handley, Conservative since 18 May 2023
- Chief Executive: Paul Bellotti since November 2025

Structure
- Seats: 67 councillors
- Graph of the party split among 67 seats.
- Political groups: Administration (23) Conservative (23) Other parties (44) Liberal Democrats (21) Labour (4) Reform (3) Green (1) Restore (1) Independent (14)

Elections
- Voting system: First past the post
- Last election: 4 May 2023
- Next election: 6 May 2027

Motto
- Tradition and progress

Meeting place
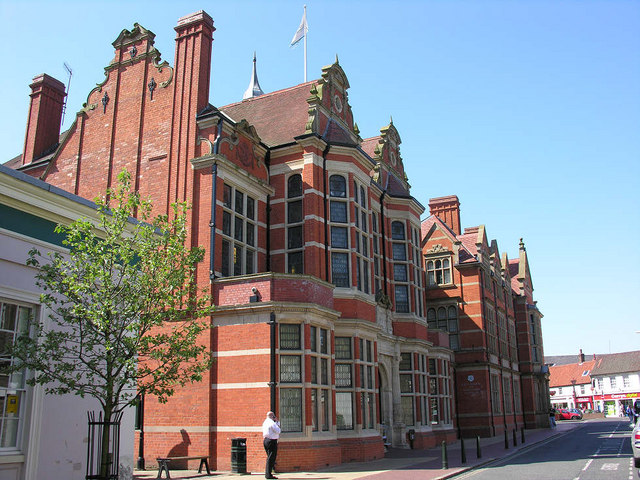
- County Hall, Cross Street, Beverley, HU17 9BA

Website
- www.eastriding.gov.uk

East Riding of Yorkshire Council is the local authority for the East Riding of Yorkshire, a unitary authority area within the larger ceremonial county of the same name. The council has been under no overall control since 2023, being led by a Conservative minority administration. It is based at County Hall in Beverley.

== History ==
The East Riding was one of the traditional subdivisions of the historic county of Yorkshire. From the middle ages the quarter sessions were held separately for each of Yorkshire's three ridings, and from 1660 there was a Lord Lieutenant of the East Riding of Yorkshire. Elected county councils were established in 1889 to take over the administrative functions previously exercised by unelected magistrates at the quarter sessions. East Riding County Council was therefore created and the East Riding became an administrative county, whilst remaining part of the wider judicial and shrieval county of Yorkshire; Kingston upon Hull became a county borough administratively independent from the East Riding. East Riding County Council based itself in Beverley, where it built County Hall in 1891.

The East Riding was abolished as an administrative area in 1974 under the Local Government Act 1972, with most of its area passing to a new county called Humberside.

Just 22 years later, in 1996, Humberside was abolished and its area was split into four districts, one of which is called East Riding of Yorkshire. Each of the four districts is legally both a non-metropolitan district and a non-metropolitan county but with no separate county council, instead having the district council also perform county functions. The district of East Riding of Yorkshire covers a slightly different area to the pre-1974 administrative county; notably the modern district includes the area around Goole which was in the West Riding prior to 1974, but excludes some northern and western parts of the pre-1974 administrative county, including the towns of Filey and Norton-on-Derwent, which had been transferred to North Yorkshire in 1974. A ceremonial county called East Riding of Yorkshire was established at the same time, with the position of Lord Lieutenant that had been abolished in 1974 being re-created. The ceremonial county covers a larger area than the district, also including the neighbouring city of Kingston upon Hull.

The council became a member of the new Hull and East Yorkshire Combined Authority in 2025, which is chaired by the directly elected Mayor of Hull and East Yorkshire.

== Governance ==
The council provides both district-level and county-level functions. The whole district is also covered by civil parishes, which form a second tier of local government for their areas.

=== Political control ===
The council has been under no overall control since the 2023 election, being run by a Conservative minority administration.

The first election to the council was held in 1995, initially acting as a shadow authority alongside the outgoing authorities until it came into its powers on 1 April 1996. Political control of the council since 1996 has been as follows:

Party in control	Years
No overall control	1996–2007
Conservative	2007–2023
No overall control	2023–present

=== Leadership ===
The leaders since 1996 have been:

Councillor	Party	From	To	Notes
Ian Male	Labour	1 Apr 1996	May 2000	Joint leaders
Stephen Parnaby	Conservative	1 Apr 1996	May 2000	Joint leaders
Bob Tress	Liberal Democrats	1 Apr 1996	May 2000	Joint leaders
Stephen Parnaby	Conservative	May 2000	Sep 2001	Joint leaders
Stewart Willie	Liberal Democrats	May 2000	Sep 2001	Joint leaders
Ian Male	Labour	May 2000	Sep 2001	Joint leaders
Stephen Parnaby	Conservative	Sep 2001	May 2019	
Richard Burton	Conservative	16 May 2019	13 May 2021	
Jonathan Owen	Conservative	13 May 2021	May 2023	
Anne Handley	Conservative	18 May 2023		

=== Composition ===
Following the 2023 election, and subsequent by-elections and changes of allegiance up to September 2026, the composition of the council was as follows:

Party	Seats
Conservative	23
Liberal Democrats	21
Labour	4
Reform	3
Green	1
Restore	1
Independent	14
Total	67

Ten of the independent councillors sit together as the "Independent Group", three form the "People not Party" group, and one sits in a group with the Liberal Democrats. The next election is due in 2027.

== Premises ==
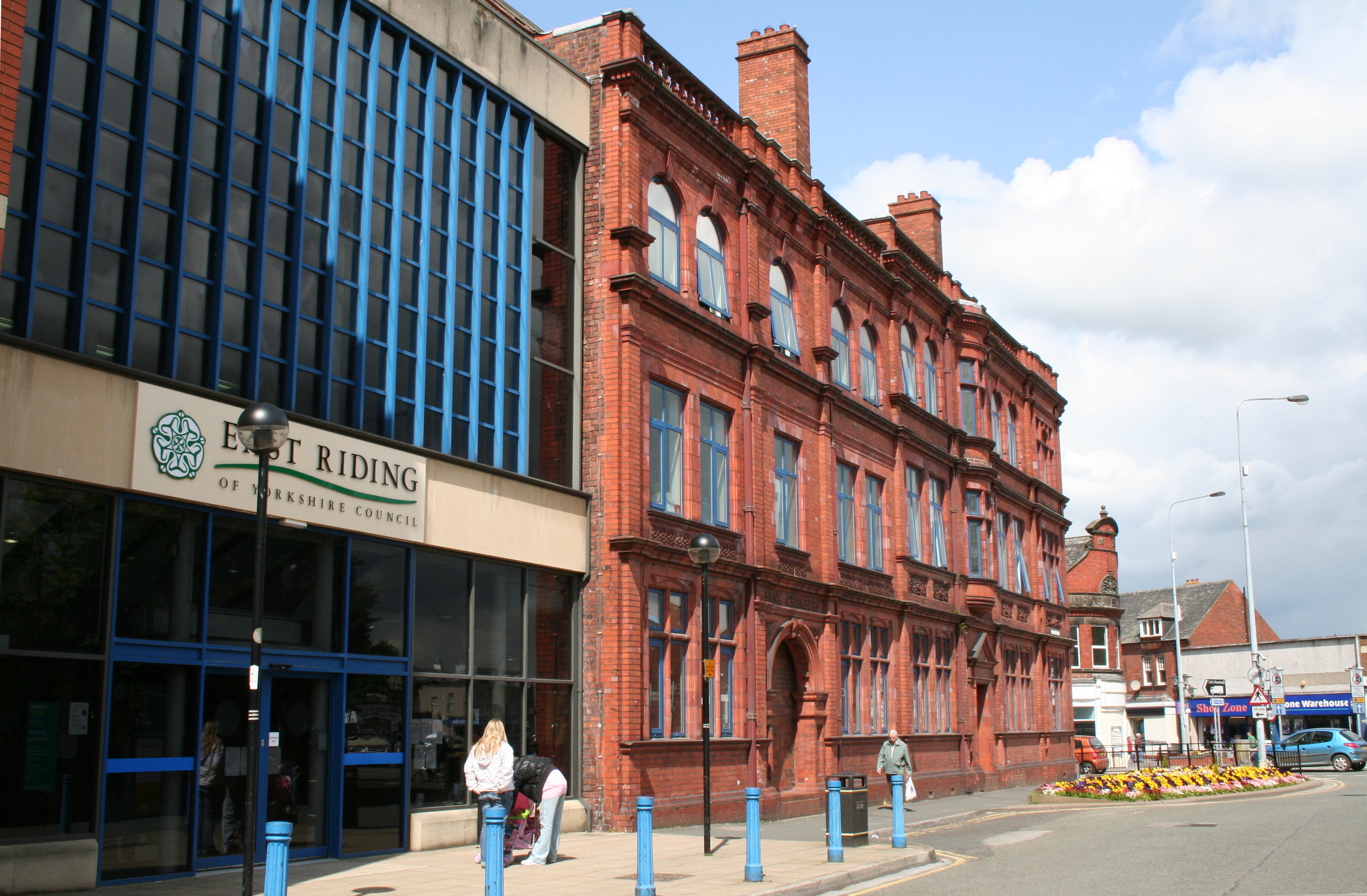
Council's offices in Goole, formerly the headquarters of Boothferry Borough Council

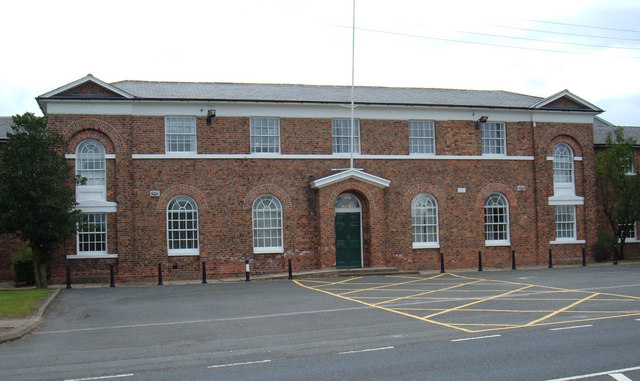
Council's offices in Skirlaugh, formerly the headquarters of Holderness Borough Council

The council's headquarters are at County Hall in Beverley, which was completed in 1891 for the old East Riding County Council and served as the headquarters of Humberside County Council between 1974 and 1996. The council has several other offices around the district, including some inherited from the pre-1996 district councils, being the Boothferry Borough Council offices in Goole, the East Yorkshire District Council offices at Bridlington Town Hall, and the Holderness Borough Council offices at Skirlaugh.

== Elections ==
Since the last full review of boundaries in 2003 the council has comprised 67 councillors representing 26 wards, with each ward electing one, two or three councillors.

East Riding of Yorkshire wards

Ward	Councillors	Map location
Beverley Rural	3	20
Bridlington North	3	26
Bridlington South	3	24
Bridlington Central and Old Town	2	25
Cottingham North	2	12
Cottingham South	2	11
Dale	3	6
Driffield and Rural	3	22
East Wolds and Coastal	3	23
Goole North	2	3
Goole South	2	2
Hessle	3	8
Howden	1	4
Howdenshire	3	5
Mid Holderness	3	17
Minster and Woodmansey	3	13
North Holderness	2	21
Pocklington Provincial	3	18
Snaith, Airmyn, Rawcliffe and Marshland	2	1
South East Holderness	3	15
South Hunsley	2	7
South West Holderness	3	16
St Mary's	3	14
Tranby	2	9
Willerby and Kirk Ella	3	10
Wolds Weighton	3	19
