= Listed buildings in Beverley (west and southwest areas) =

Beverley is a civil parish in the county of the East Riding of Yorkshire, England. It contains about 450 listed buildings that are recorded in the National Heritage List for England. Of these, eight are listed at Grade I, the highest of the three grades, 31 are at Grade II*, the middle grade, and the others are at Grade II, the lowest grade. The parish contains the market town of Beverley and the surrounding region. This list contains the listed buildings in the areas described by Pevsner and Neave as the west and southwest areas, which include Lairgate, Newbegin, Keldgate and the adjacent streets. The areas are largely residential, and most of the listed buildings are houses, cottages and associated structures. The others include a turret moved from a church, former almshouses, a former warehouse, a public house, lamp standards, a pair of lodges, a former bank, a former workhouse and its gateway, a library and art gallery, and, out to the west, two former windmills.

== Key ==
Grade	Criteria
I	Buildings of exceptional interest, sometimes considered to be internationally important
II*	Particularly important buildings of more than special interest
II	Buildings of national importance and special interest

== Buildings ==
Name and location	Photograph	Date	Notes	Grade
Gothic turret 53.84055°N 0.42987°W		15th century	The turret has been moved from St Mary's Church. It is in stone, and in Gothic style. The turret is octagonal, on a stone base, with two columns and a cornice. It is open on one side, and at the top is cresting and a pierced parapet.	II
65 Lairgate; 53.84059°N 0.43131°W	—	Late 17th century	The main part of the house dates from the late 18th century, and is in painted brick with wide projecting eaves, iron spouting and a slate roof. There are two storeys and attics, and four bays, the right bay projecting slightly, and containing a sill band. The doorway has Doric pilasters, an entablature, an arched fanlight, a dentilled cornice and an open pediment. The windows are sashes, and on the roof are three gabled dormers. The older part to the left has two storeys and one bay. It has a moulded eaves cornice and a pantile roof, and contain a doorway and a window above.	II
The Old Manse; 53.84081°N 0.43143°W		Late 17th century	The building is in brown brick, painted on the front, on a plinth, with a moulded eaves cornice, and a pantile roof, hipped on the left. There are two storeys and four bays. On the front is a carriage entrance, and sash windows, and on the roof is a flat-roofed dormer. At the rear is a two-storey splayed bay window, and a doorway with a rectangular fanlight.	II
14 and 16 Newbegin; 53.84224°N 0.43474°W		c. 1689	The house, later divided, is in red brick, with a shaped bracketed eaves cornice, and a hipped tile roof. There are two storeys and attics, and seven bays. Steps with a wrought iron rail and scrapers lead up to the central doorway that has a moulded shouldered architrave, a traceried fanlight, a pulvinated frieze and a cornice. The windows are sashes with flat gauged brick arches, and on the roof are three dormers, the central one with a pediment, and the outer ones with rounded heads.	II*
30 and 32 Lairgate; 53.84210°N 0.43292°W		c. 1690	Two houses in painted brick, the older being No. 30 on the right. This has three storeys, five bays, an eaves cornice and a slate roof. In the centre is a doorway that has panelled pilasters with decorated caps, an architrave, an ornamental frieze and a dentilled pediment, and to the right is a doorway with a plain surround. The windows are sash windows, those on the top floor with gauged brick arches. No. 32 dates from the late 18th century, and has two storeys and attics, and three bays, a moulded eaves cornice and a pantile roof. The doorway has a divided fanlight, the windows are sashes, and there are two gabled dormers.	II
The Old Grammar School; 53.83778°N 0.42870°W		c. 1696	The house was at one time used as a school. The front, which dates from the 18th century, is stuccoed, and has a moulded bracketed eaves cornice. There are two storeys and seven bays. The central doorway has an architrave, chambranles, a fanlight, moulded consoles, a frieze, a central tablet, and a dentiled pediment. The windows are reglazed, and there are three gabled dormers. The garden front is in brick with a hipped tile roof and five bays.	II*
9 Newbegin; 53.84225°N 0.43392°W		c. 1700	The house is in red brick on a plinth, with a moulded eaves cornice, and a tile roof with tumbled brickwork on the gables. There are two storeys and attics, and three bays. Steps with wrought iron rails and scrapers lead up to the doorway that has an architrave, chambranles, decorated consoles, a frieze broken over the consoles decorated with three fleurs-de-lys and fluting, and a dentilled pediment. To its left is a canted bay window, the other windows are sashes, there is a smaller window to the right with a segmental head, and on the roof are two gabled dormers.	II
Keldgate Manor; 53.83794°N 0.42702°W		c. 1700	The house is in painted stucco, with rusticated quoins, a cornice on paired brackets with paterae, and a slate roof. There are three storeys and three bays. On the garden front is a projecting three-storey porch and a doorway with a fanlight. There is a three-storey canted bay window, and the other windows are sashes.	II
2 Lairgate; 53.84326°N 0.43343°W		Early 18th century	The shop is in colourwashed brick, with a moulded eaves cornice,and a pantile roof. There are two storeys and one bay. The ground floor has a shopfront with a bow window on a stone base, pilasters, a broken entablature, and a modillion cornice on small consoles. To the left is a double doorway, and on the upper floor is a three-light sash window.	II
4 Lairgate; 53.84322°N 0.43340°W		Early 18th century	The shop is in painted brick with a pantile roof. There are two storeys and an attic, and two bays. On the ground floor is a shopfront with pilasters and an entablature, and to the left is a passage doorway with a rectangular fanlight. The upper floor contains two sash windows, and there is a gabled dormer with sliding casements.	II
Keldgate House; 53.83763°N 0.42838°W		Early 18th century	The house is in painted stucco, with rusticated quoins, wood spouting on moulded console blocks, and a pantile roof. There are three storeys and three bays. The central doorway has a rusticated surround, a keystone carved with a female mask, and a pediment. To its left is a square bay window, and the other windows are sashes. To the right is a projecting block in red brick, with one storey and four bays, and tumbled brickwork in the gable ends. It has a coved and beaded cornice, and the windows have flat gauged brick heads. The interior is finely decorated.	II*
Walls, gate piers and gate, 51 and 51A Keldgate; 53.83772°N 0.42841°W		Early 18th century	Along the forecourt is a wall in red brick with coping about 2.5 metres (8 ft 2 in) in height. It contains low piers with stone caps, and a gate in wrought and cast iron.	II
14 Lairgate; 53.84287°N 0.43324°W		Early or mid-18th century	The building is in red brick, and has a parapet and a pantile roof. There are three storeys and five bays. The central doorway has applied elongated Tuscan columns, a recessed reeded transom, a fanlight, an entablature and a shelf cornice, and to the right is a shop window. The other windows are sashes with painted gauged flat brick arches.	II
Newbegin Bar House; 53.84167°N 0.43581°W		1745–46	The house, on a corner site, is in red brick, and has a pantile roof with tumbled brickwork on the gable end, two storeys and attics. The front facing Albert Terrace has five bays. It contains sash windows, those on the ground floor with painted gauged brick heads, and those on the upper floor with shutters, and above are two gabled dormers. On the front facing Newbegin is a porch with paired pilasters, an entablature and a recessed doorway, on the far left is a pair of carriage doors, and on the roof are three dormers, two gabled.	II
10 and 12 Newbegin; 53.84242°N 0.43388°W		1746	The house is in red brick, with sill bands, eaves brackets and a slate roof. There are three storeys and three bays, and a rear wing with two storeys and four bays. The central doorway has engaged Doric columns, an entablature, a radial fanlight, a pulvinated frieze and a cornice. The windows are sashes with painted stone heads.	II
Ann Routh's Almshouses; 53.83824°N 0.42717°W		1749	A row of almshouses in red brick on a plinth with two storeys. The entrance front facing the street has three bays, each with semicircular gauged arch on pilasters. In the centre is a doorway with a plain architrave and a three-light rectangular fanlight, and elsewhere are sash windows with flat gauged brick heads. Above is a moulded cornice and a pediment containing a Rococo cartouche of arms above an inscribed tablet.	II
10 Keldgate; 53.83826°N 0.42621°W		Mid-18th century	The house is in brick on a stone plinth, with a cogged eaves cornice and a tile roof. There are two storeys and two bays. The doorway is in the centre, and the windows are horizontally sliding sashes.	II
14 and 16 Keldgate; 53.83815°N 0.42646°W		18th century	A pair of houses in rough rendered brick on a plinth, with a pantile roof and tumbled brickwork on the gable end. There are two storeys and six bays. At the ends are doorways with plain surrounds, and in the centre is a blocked doorway. The windows are modern, and there are three blocked windows.	II
Coach house, wall and gatepiers, 31 Keldgate; 53.83786°N 0.42736°W		18th century	The coach house is in brick, with tumbled brickwork in the gable ends, and two storeys. The garden wall contains two arched gateways, one blocked, and two gate piers with ball finials and modern gates.	II
61 and 63 Keldgate; 53.83759°N 0.42930°W		18th century	A pair of rendered houses, with a dentilled eaves cornice, and a steep pantile roof with tumbled brickwork on the gable end. There are two storeys and three bays. On the front are two doorways, the windows are sashes, and there are two sloped dormers.	II
71 and 73 Keldgate; 53.83753°N 0.42969°W		Mid-18th century	A pair of houses in painted brick, with a diagonally-set brick eaves cornice, and a pantile roof with moulded gable ends. There are two storeys and four bays. The doorways have rectangular fanlights, the windows are sashes, and all the openings have segmental-arched heads.	II
16 Lairgate; 53.84277°N 0.43320°W		18th century (probable)	The shop is in painted brick with a slate roof. There are two storeys and three bays. The ground floor has a doorway and a shop window, both with pilasters and entablatures, and the doorway with a divided fanlight. The upper floor contains sash windows with gauged flat arches.	II
24 Lairgate; 53.84238°N 0.43310°W		18th century	The house is in red brick on a stone plinth, with a wood block bracketed eaves cornice, and a pantile roof with moulded kneelers. There are two storeys and three bays. The doorway has applied Doric columns, an architrave, a decorated rectangular fanlight, a frieze and a cornice. The windows are sashes with painted flat gauged arches.	II
33 Lairgate; 53.84203°N 0.43253°W		18th century	A warehouse, later used for other purposes, in brick, partly rendered, with a dentilled cornice, and a pantile roof with tumbled brickwork on the gable end. There are three storeys and three bays. Most of the openings are modern.	II
34 Lairgate; 53.84199°N 0.43274°W		18th century	The building is in brick with a double-span slate roof. There are two storeys and three bays. The doorway has a segmental head and a three-light fanlight. The windows are sashes, those on the ground floor with rendered lintels.	II
Garden wall, 65 Lairgate; 53.84024°N 0.43114°W		18th century (probable)	The garden wall runs along Lairgate and Champney Road, and is curved on the corner. It is in brick, with stone coping and brick buttresses, and is about 3 metres (9.8 ft) in height.	II
70 Lairgate; 53.84119°N 0.43189°W		18th century	The house is in limewashed brick with a pantile roof. There are two storeys and attics, and two bays. The central doorway has a moulded surround, and the windows are casements.	II
78 Lairgate; 53.84068°N 0.43158°W		Mid-18th century	A stable block, later converted for residential use, in red brick, with a sill band, a cornice, wood spouting on wrought iron brackets, and a pantile roof. There are two storeys and three bays, each bay containing a round-headed gauged brick arch. The right bay has a full-height arch and contains a carriage entrance, above which is a small window. The middle arch is lower and blind, and above it is a segmental-arched opening. The left arch is full-height and blind, and contains a small window.	II
82 and 84 Lairgate; 53.84055°N 0.43151°W		18th century	The house is rendered, on a plinth, with a partial floor band, a dentilled eaves cornice and a pantile roof. There are two storeys and three bays. The doorway has a divided fanlight, and the windows are sashes.	II
119 and 121 Lairgate; 53.83785°N 0.43024°W		18th century	Two houses in brick, partly rendered, with a pantile roof and tumbled brickwork on the gable ends. There are two storeys and an attic, and three bays. The right bay contains a 19th-century shopfront with pilasters, to the left is a doorway with a divided fanlight, and the windows are sashes.	II
17 and 19 Minster Moorgate; 53.83926°N 0.42713°W		18th century	A pair of houses in brick, with a pantile roof and tumbled brickwork on the gable end. There are two storeys and three bays. The left doorway has pilasters, a three-pane fanlight, an entablature and a cornice, the right doorway has a three-pane fanlight and a segmental head, and between them is a flat carriage entry. The windows are sashes, those on the ground floor with segmental heads.	II
Former stables, 14 and 16 Newbegin; 53.84201°N 0.43509°W		18th century	The stable block, later converted for residential use, is in brick with a steep pantile roof. The gable end faces the road, and contains tall carriage doors, above which is a hoist door and a window. On the left is a later extension under a catslide roof containing a doorway.	II
Wall, gate piers and railings, 14 and 16 Newbegin; 53.84218°N 0.43450°W		18th century (probable)	The garden wall is in brick with stone coping, and is about 2 metres (6 ft 7 in) in height. It contains two brick gate piers with stone cornices to the caps and stone consoles crowning the imposts. The railings are in wrought iron with pierced spearheads, on a brick wall with stone coping.	II
Garden wall, 31 Newbegin; 53.84147°N 0.43571°W	—	18th century	The garden wall, which runs along the east side of Albert Terrace, is in brick with stone coping, and is about 3 metres (9.8 ft) in height.	II
Cromwell House; 53.84076°N 0.43164°W		18th century or earlier	The house is in brown brick, with a moulded eaves cornice, and a slate roof with tumbled brickwork on the gable end. There are two storeys and attics and two bays. The doorway in the right bay has pilasters, a rectangular fanlight and a dentilled cornice, the windows are sashes, and above is a gabled dormer.	II
Trees Cottage; 53.84036°N 0.43146°W		18th century (probable)	The house is rendered, and has a dentilled eaves cornice and a pantile roof. There are two storeys and two bays. The doorway in the right bay has pilasters, an entablature and a rectangular fanlight. To its right is a passage doorway, and the windows are sashes.	II
93 Minster Moorgate; 53.83894°N 0.43056°W		1758	The house, on a corner site, is in red brick on a plinth, with a moulded cornice, oversailing brick courses to the eaves, an iron gutter, and a pantile and tile roof with tumbled brickwork on the gable end. There are two storeys and attics, and an L-shaped plan, with three bays on Lairgate. The doorway has a three-light fanlight and a large lion mask knocker, and the windows are sashes. On the garden front is a triple window, an ogee bracketed cornice, and two gabled dormers.	II
Lairgate Hall; 53.83944°N 0.43201°W		c. 1760	A house, later used as offices, in red brick on a plinth, with stone dressings, rusticated quoins, a modillion cornice, and a hipped Westmorland slate roof. There are two storeys and attics, and an east front of five bays. In the centre, steps lead up to a tetrastyle Roman Doric portico in sandstone, and a doorway with a reeded architrave and a semicircular fanlight. Above the portico is a balustrade, and a tripartite window with an entablature and flanking attached Geek Ionic columns and pilasters. The outer bays contain sash windows with flat brick gauged heads and triple keystones, and moulded sills, and there are three pedimented roof dormers. The south front is flanked by two large semi-octagonal bays, each with three windows.	I
Cross Keys Hotel; 53.84307°N 0.43333°W		Mid-1760s	The public house is in painted brick on a plinth, with a moulded eaves cornice, and a slate roof. There are three storeys and five bays. The central doorway has applied Tuscan columns and an entablature. The windows are sashes with flat gauged arches and triple keystones. Inside, there is a staircase moved from elsewhere.	II*
Warton's Almshouses; 53.83915°N 0.42973°W		1774	The almshouses are in red brick on a plinth, with a moulded brick cornice, and a tile roof with moulded stone coped gables. There are two storeys and nine bays. In the centre is a doorway approached by steps with wrought iron rails, with a rusticated head. Most of the windows are horizontally sliding sashes with flat brick gauged heads, and there are smaller intermediate windows.	II
12 Keldgate; 53.83820°N 0.42632°W		Late 18th century	The house is in brick with a pantile roof. There are two storeys and two bays. The doorway has a plain surround, to its left is a shop window with pilasters, and on the far right is a passage doorway. The other windows are casements.	II
59 Keldgate; 53.83759°N 0.42918°W		Late 18th century	The house is in brick with a pantile roof. There are two storeys and an attic, and two bays. The doorway on the left bay has a divided rectangular fanlight, the windows are sashes with brick voussoirs, and on the roof is a dormer.	II
31 Lairgate; 53.84208°N 0.43262°W		Late 18th century	The house is in red brick, with an eaves board and a pantile roof. There are three storeys and five bays. The doorway has an architrave, a divided fanlight, a frieze with a central tablet and a dentilled pediment. The windows are sashes.	II
39 and 41 Minster Moorgate; 53.83915°N 0.42844°W		Late 18th century	A pair of houses in brown brick, with wood spouting to the eaves, and a pantile roof. There are two storeys and two bays. The doorways have plain surrounds, the windows are sash windows, and the ground floor openings have flat gauged brick arches. On the upper floor are two blank recesses.	II
49–67 Minster Moorgate; 53.83909°N 0.42907°W		Late 18th century	A terrace of ten houses in red brick, with a dentilled eaves cornice, iron spouting on wrought iron brackets, and a pantile roof with tumbled brickwork on the gable ends. There are two storeys, and each house has one bay. The doorways have plain surrounds, most of the windows are horizontally sliding sashes, and all the openings have flat gauged brick heads.	II
75–81 Minster Moorgate; 53.83902°N 0.42990°W		Late 18th century	A terrace of four houses in red brick, with wood spouting to the eaves, and a pantile roof. There are two storeys and four bays. The doorways have plain surrounds, and the outer two have rectangular fanlights. The windows are horizontally sliding sashes, and all the openings have flat gauged brick heads.	II
3 Newbegin; 53.84232°N 0.43359°W		Late 18th century	The house is in brick, with a dentilled eaves cornice and a pantile roof. There are two storeys and attics, and three bays. The central doorway has an architrave and chambranles, a rectangular fanlight, decorated consoles, a frieze, a dentilled cornice broken over the consoles, and an open pediment containing a cartouche of fruit and flowers. The windows are sashes with gauged brick heads, and on the roof are two gabled dormers.	II
5 and 7 Newbegin; 53.84230°N 0.43375°W		Late 18th century	A pair of houses in brick, with projecting eaves courses and a pantile roof. There are two storeys and five bays. The doorway is on the left, and in the centre is a carriage entry. The windows are sashes, the ground floor windows and the doorway with segmental heads.	II
Minster Garth; 53.83843°N 0.42593°W		Late 18th century	A house, later used for other purposes, in red brick, with a sill bands, a bracketed eaves cornice, and a hipped slate roof. There are three storeys and three bays, and on the right is a projecting two-storey wing connected by a short link. In the centre, steps lead up to a doorway with applied Doric columns, an entablature, a decorated rectangular fanlight and a cornice. This is flanked by canted bay windows, and the other windows are sashes with incised lintels and fluted keystones.	II
6 Newbegin; 53.84248°N 0.43347°W		c. 1780	The house is in red brick, with a dentilled and ogee bracketed eaves cornice, and a slate roof. There are three storeys and four bays. Steps with wrought iron rails lead up to the doorway that has an architrave, chambranles, a divided fanlight, decorated consoles, a frieze and a dentilled pediment. The windows on the lower two floors are sashes with painted flat gauged arches, and on the top floor are three-light casement windows.	II
8 Newbegin; 53.84246°N 0.43363°W		c. 1780	The house is in red brick, with a dentilled and ogee bracketed eaves cornice, and a slate roof. There are two storeys and attics, and four bays. Steps with wrought iron rails and scrapers lead up to the doorway that has an architrave, chambranles, a divided fanlight, decorated consoles, a frieze with an urn and scrolling, and a dentilled pediment. The windows are sashes with painted flat gauged arches, and there are two gabled dormers.	II
72 and 74 Lairgate; 53.84106°N 0.43184°W		c. 1797	A pair of houses in red brick, with a sill band, a bracketed eaves cornice and a pantile roof. There are three storeys and six bays. In the centre of each house is a doorway with applied Doric columns, a decorated fanlight, a lintel, and a dentilled pediment. The windows are sashes with flat gauged brick arches, those on the ground floor with panelled shutters.	II
86 and 88 Lairgate; 53.84046°N 0.43149°W		c. 1800	A pair of houses in white brick, with an eaves fascia, and a hipped pantile roof. There are three storeys and four bays. The doorways in the outer bays each has panelled pilasters, an entablature, a decorative fanlight, fluted consoles, and a dentilled cornice. The windows are sashes with painted rendered flat arches.	II
127 and 128 Keldgate; 53.83721°N 0.43192°W		Late 18th or early 19th century	A pair of houses in brick, with some rusticated quoins, and a pantile roof. There are two storeys and four bays. On the front are two doorways, a carriage entry, and sash windows, all with rendered voussoirs.	II
29 and 29A Newbegin; 53.84185°N 0.43528°W		Late 18th to early 19th century	The house is in brick with a pantile roof. There are two storeys and five bays. The doorway has a moulded surround and a rectangular fanlight, and the windows are sashes. The doorway and ground floor windows have segmental heads.	II
Black Mill; 53.83706°N 0.45020°W		1803	The former windmill is in tarred brick. It is circular and tapering, with five storeys, and has an embattled top.	II
Union Mill; 53.83290°N 0.44885°W		1803	The former windmill is in tarred brick. It is circular and tapering, with three storeys, and has an embattled top.	II
22 Lairgate; 53.84259°N 0.43318°W		c. 1820	The house is in red brick, with sill bands, wooden spouting on paired shaped stone brackets, and a slate roof. There are two storeys and three bays. In the centre is a Doric doorcase and a doorway with a fanlight, and it is flanked by cast iron foot scrapers. The windows are sashes with rusticated stone heads, and keystones carved with anthemion.	II
Lamp standard, 18 Newbegin; 53.84190°N 0.43527°W		1824–26	The lamp standard is in cast iron, and has a square stepped base with a wreathed shield with lion mask on each face. On this is an octagonal step, and a column, fluted in the lower part, the upper part tapering, surmounted by a copper lantern.	II
Lamp standard, 2 Westwood Road; 53.84164°N 0.43607°W		1824–26	The lamp standard is in cast iron, and has a square stepped base with a wreathed shield with lion mask on each face. On this is an octagonal step, and a column, fluted in the lower part, the upper part tapering, surmounted by a copper lantern.	II
Lamp standard, 60 Wood Lane; 53.84248°N 0.43649°W		1824–26	The lamp standard is in cast iron, and has a square stepped base with a wreathed shield with lion mask on each face. On this is an octagonal step, and a column, fluted in the lower part, the upper part tapering, surmounted by a copper lantern.	II
Lamp standard, Newbegin House; 53.84207°N 0.43471°W	—	1824–26	The lamp standard is in cast iron, and has a square stepped base with a wreathed shield with lion mask on each face. On this is an octagonal step, and a column, fluted in the lower part, the upper part tapering, surmounted by a copper lantern.	II
Lamp standard in front of the north wing of The Hall; 53.83975°N 0.43193°W	—	1824–26	The lamp standard is in cast iron, and has a square stepped base with a wreathed shield with lion mask on each face. On this is an octagonal step, and a column, fluted in the lower part, the upper part tapering, surmounted by a copper lantern.	II
Lamp standard n the courtyard of The Hall; 53.83974°N 0.43239°W	—	1824–26	The lamp standard is in cast iron, and has a square stepped base with a wreathed shield with lion mask on each face. On this is an octagonal step, and a column, fluted in the lower part, the upper part tapering, surmounted by a copper lantern.	II
Holborn House; 53.83803°N 0.43069°W		c. 1825	The house is in brick, stuccoed and painted on the front, with rusticated quoins, a wide plaster soffit to the eaves, and a hipped slate roof. There are two storeys, three bays, and a lower two-bay wing on the left. In the centre of the main block is a porch that has two columns with clustered shafts, a moulded entablature with a pulvinated frieze, and a doorway with a Gothic-style fanlight. Above the porch is a canopy with decorative ogee tracery including poppy heads and crockets. Flanking the porch are canted bay windows, and the other windows are sashes.	II
22–26 Keldgate; 53.83812°N 0.42676°W		Early 19th century	A terrace of three houses in red brick, with a slate roof and coped gables. There are two storeys and six bays. Each bay contains a full-height recessed round-headed arch divided by pilasters with stone caps and projecting bases. The doorways have plain architraves, and divided fanlights. The windows are sashes, those on the upper floor with segmental heads.	II
Foregate wall, 22–26 Keldgate; 53.83805°N 0.42678°W		Early 19th century	The wall enclosing the forecourt to the house is in brick with stone coping and is ramped at the ends. It contains piers with stone capping, and consoles to the imposts.	II
45 and 47 Keldgate; 53.83777°N 0.42792°W		Early 19th century	A pair of lodges of similar design in painted stucco, with wide eaves, a stucco soffit, a scalloped valance and a low-pitched hipped slate roof. Both lodges have one storey and three bays, each bay with a full-height recessed round arch. The doorways, with a divided fanlight, are in the middle bay, and the outer bays contain sash windows.	II
49 and 49A Keldgate; 53.83775°N 0.42812°W		Early 19th century	The house is in red brick with a slate roof. There are two storeys and five bays. The porch has columns and pilasters, between which are iron railings, an entablature, panelled reveals, and steps leading to a doorway with a rectangular fanlight. In the right bay is a carriage entry with a segmental arch. The windows are sashes with rendered lintels.	II
53–57 Keldgate; 53.83762°N 0.42902°W		Early 19th century	A terrace of three houses in brick with a pantile roof. There are two storeys and four bays. On the front are three doorways, the windows are sashes, and all the openings have rendered lintels. In the right bay is a flat-headed carriage entry.	II
135 Keldgate; 53.83713°N 0.43226°W	—	Early 19th century	The house is in white brick, with a sill band and a pantile roof. There are two storeys and two bays. The doorway on the right bay has pilasters, an entablature, a rectangular fanlight and a cornice. The windows are sashes with rendered voussoirs.	II
69 Lairgate; 53.84000°N 0.43071°W		Early 19th century	The house is in white brick, with a sill band, a moulded gutter on widely spaced modillion blocks to the eaves, and a hipped slate roof. There are two storeys and three bays. In the centre is a porch with two Tuscan columns and an entablature, and a doorway with a decorated fanlight. The windows are sashes with painted stone rusticated heads.	II
71 Lairgate; 53.83988°N 0.43065°W		Early 19th century	The house is in white brick, with a sill band, a moulded gutter on widely spaced modillion blocks to the eaves, and a hipped slate roof. There are two storeys and three bays. The doorway is in a recessed porch at the side of the house. The windows are sashes with painted stone rusticated heads.	II
80 Lairgate; 53.84064°N 0.43151°W		Early 19th century	The house is in red brick, and has an eaves soffit with widely spaced block brackets, and a slate roof. There are three storeys and two bays. The doorway in the left bay has pilasters, an entablature, a rectangular fanlight, and a cornice. The windows are sashes with stuccoed flat arches.	II
5–13 Minster Moorgate; 53.83929°N 0.42678°W		Early 19th century	A terrace of five houses in red brick with a pantile roof. There are two storeys and each house has one bay. The left doorway has pilaster, a frieze and a cornice, and the others have rectangular fanlights, and segmental heads. The windows are sashes, those on the ground floor with segmental heads.	II
69–71 Minster Moorgate; 53.83905°N 0.42970°W		Early 19th century	A terrace of three houses in red brick, the eaves with paired brackets, and a pantile roof. There are three storeys and three bays. In the centre of the ground floor is a shopfront with pilasters, an entablature and a cornice. The doorways have divided fanlights, the windows are sashes, and the openings have rendered lintels.	II
Gates, gate piers and wall, 10 Newbegin; 53.84240°N 0.43377°W		Early 19th century	To the left of the house is a quadrant wall in brick. To the right of the house are iron gates and gate piers.	II
39 and 41 Westwood Road; 53.84099°N 0.43758°W		Early 19th century	A pair of brick houses with a dentilled eaves cornice and a pantile roof. There are two storeys and three bays. The right doorway has pilasters, a rectangular fanlight, a frieze and a cornice. The left doorway has a plain surround and a divided fanlight, above which is a rectangular bay window, to the left is a round-headed passage entry, and to the right are sash windows. The windows on the right bay are modern, and the ground floor windows have segmental heads.	II
43–47 Westwood Road; 53.84095°N 0.43768°W		Early 19th century	A terrace of three brick houses, with a partial dentilled eaves cornice and a pantile roof. There are two storeys and four bays, the left bay lower. The three doorways have rectangular fanlights, and between them is a round-arched passage entry with a semicircular fanlight. Most of the windows are sashes; those on the right bay are modern. The ground floor openings have slightly segmental heads.	II
Forecourt wall, piers and lamp holders, Ann Routh's Almshouses; 53.83800°N 0.42708°W		Early 19th century	Rebuilt to the original design, the wall is in red brick with stone coping and curved ramps. It contains low piers with stone coping, and console caps to the imposts. They are surmounted by ornamental wrought iron lamp holders.	II
Boundary marker 53.84027°N 0.43073°W		Early 19th century	The parish boundary marker consists of a cast iron plaque set into a wall on the north side of Champney Road. It has a curved top and is divided into three sections. The top section is inscribed "PARISH BOUNDARY" and in the lower sections are the names of the parishes.	II
The Tiger Inn; 53.83848°N 0.43036°W		Early 19th century	The public house is in rendered brick, with applied timber framing and a tile roof. There are two storeys and three bays, the middle bay gabled with carved bargeboards. The doorway is in the centre, and the windows are modern.	II
Woolpack Public House; 53.84102°N 0.43747°W		Early 19th century	The public house is in painted brick with a pantile roof. There are two storeys and two bays. The doorway has a rectangular four-light fanlight, the windows are sashes, and the ground floor openings have slightly segmental heads.	II
4 Newbegin; 53.84249°N 0.43334°W		1826	The house is in brick with a pantile roof. There are two storeys and two bays. The doorway is on the left, the windows are sash windows, and all have segmental heads.	II
Lamp standard west of 26 Newbegin; 53.84177°N 0.43571°W		After 1826	The lamp standard is in cast iron, and has a square stepped base with a wreath on each face. On this is an octagonal step, and a column, fluted in the lower part, the upper part tapering, surmounted by a copper lantern.	II
Lamp standard, 2 St Mary's Terrace; 53.84223°N 0.43679°W	—	After 1826	The lamp standard is in cast iron, and has a square stepped base with a wreath on each face. On this is an octagonal step, and a column, fluted in the lower part, the upper part tapering, surmounted by a copper lantern.	II
Lamp standard opposite 20 The Woodlands; 53.84200°N 0.43743°W	—	After 1826	The lamp standard is in cast iron, and has a square stepped base with a wreath on each face. On this is an octagonal step, and a column, fluted in the lower part, the upper part tapering, surmounted by a copper lantern.	II
Lamp standard, 36 The Woodlands; 53.84166°N 0.43788°W	—	After 1826	The lamp standard is in cast iron, and has a square stepped base with a wreath on each face. On this is an octagonal step, and a column, fluted in the lower part, the upper part tapering, surmounted by a copper lantern.	II
Lamp standard, 7 Willow Grove; 53.84381°N 0.43820°W	—	After 1826	The lamp standard is in cast iron, and has a square stepped base with a wreath on each face. On this is an octagonal step, and a column, fluted in the lower part, the upper part tapering, surmounted by a copper lantern.	II
Lamp standard, 17 Willow Grove; 53.84353°N 0.43885°W		After 1826	The lamp standard is in cast iron, and has a square stepped base with a wreath on each face. On this is an octagonal step, and a column, fluted in the lower part, the upper part tapering, surmounted by a copper lantern.	II
Lamp standard south of Newbegin Bar House; 53.84151°N 0.43574°W		After 1826	The lamp standard is in cast iron, and has a square stepped base with a wreath on each face. On this is an octagonal step, and a column, fluted in the lower part, the upper part tapering, surmounted by a copper lantern.	II
Lamp standard in front of The Hall; 53.83957°N 0.43191°W	—	After 1826	The lamp standard is in cast iron, and has a square stepped base with a wreath on each face. On this is an octagonal step, and a column, fluted in the lower part, the upper part tapering, surmounted by a copper lantern.	II
Lamp standard, 20 St Giles Croft; 53.83997°N 0.43595°W		c. 1830	The lamp standard is in cast iron. It has a fluted column in two stages with moulded bases and a foliated capital. It is surmounted by a later box and gooseneck lamp holder.	II
29 Westwood Road; 53.84115°N 0.43699°W		Early to mid-19th century	The house is in grey brick on a stone plinth, with a sill band, and a hipped Welsh slate roof. There are two storeys and three bays. The central doorway has attached Doric columns, an entablature, a semicircular fanlight, and a cornice. The windows are sashes with stuccoed lintels.	II
Acacia House; 53.83711°N 0.43242°W		Early to mid-19th century	A pair of houses in white brick, with sill bands and a slate roof. There are two storeys and five bays. There are two doorways, the left with attached columns, panelled reveals, a radiating fanlight, and a cornice, the right with a plain surround and a rectangular fanlight. The windows are sashes with rusticated rendered lintels.	II
26 and 28 Lairgate; 53.84224°N 0.43298°W		1843	Originally a savings bank, the building is in sandstone on a plinth, with a slate roof. There are two storeys and five bays. The middle three bays project under a pediment containing a tablet. The bays are flanked by Ionic pilasters with carved capitals, and carry an entablature. The ground floor windows are paired with a mullion, and have moulded consoles, and shield cornices. The windows on the upper floor have keystones, and below them is a band. The narrow outer bays each contains a doorway with an architrave, a fanlight and a shelf cornice.	II
6 Lairgate; 53.84317°N 0.43339°W		Mid-19th century	The shop is in red brick, with a sill band, an eaves board and a tile roof. There are three storeys and two bays. On the ground floor is a shopfront with pilasters and an entablature, and a separate doorway to the right. The upper floors contain sash windows with rendered lintels.	II
2–14 Minster Moorgate; 53.83942°N 0.42591°W		Mid-19th century	A terrace of seven houses in red brick with a slate roof. There are two storeys and attics, and each house has one bay. The doorways are on the left and have a rectangular fanlight, mostly divided, most of the windows are sashes, and all the openings have rendered lintels. On the roof are gabled dormers.	II
11 Westwood Road; 53.84134°N 0.43634°W		Mid-19th century	The house is in rendered brick on a plinth, it has a Welsh slate roof with cope gables, and is in Gothic style. There are two storeys and an attic, and two bays. The doorway in the right bay has a four-centred arched fanlight with three lights, the windows are sashes, and all the openings have rectangular hood moulds. Above is a flat-roofed dormer.	II
Gate piers, Westwood Hall; 53.84068°N 0.43881°W		Mid-19th century	There are pairs of gate piers flanking the two entrances to the grounds of the house. They square and in stone, and have dentilled cornices and rosettes.	II
Westwood Hall; 53.84039°N 0.43840°W		c. 1854	A large house in yellow brick, with a sill band, a floor band and a hipped Welsh slate roof. There are two storeys, and in the centre is a porch with columns and piers. This is flanked by two-storey curved bay windows with three lights and brick voussoirs. To the left is a wing containing round-headed windows.	II
Original block, Westwood Hospital; 53.84142°N 0.43991°W		1860–61	Originally a workhouse designed by J. B. and W. Atkinson, later used as a hospital, and subsequently converted for residential use. It is in red brick, with stone dressings, rusticated quoins and a Welsh slate roof. There are two storeys, a central block of eleven bays, and projecting gabled wings. The central bay projects, and contains a doorway with a stone architrave and a cusped head. Above it is a rounded oriel window with mullioned and transomed windows, over which is a clock in a round surround, and a moulded gable with a finial and a bell. Two of the outer bays have a projecting gabled upper storey, and the windows are sashes.	II
60–66 Lairgate; 53.84133°N 0.43202°W		1862	A row of four cottages, originally almshouses, in red brick, with a string course forming a frieze, a cogged brick cornice, and a pantile roof. There is a single storey and attics, and each cottage has one bay. On the front are four doorways with a horizontally sliding sash window to the right, all under a relieving arch. Above, each cottage has a gabled dormer with slightly cusped bargeboards.	II
44 and 46 Westwood Road; 53.84102°N 0.43827°W		1895	A pair of mirror-image houses in brick with a slate roof. There are three storeys and five bays. The ground floor of the central bay has two windows, flanked by doorways with rectangular two-light fanlights and flat hoods on brackets. Above is a six-light window with a central decorative panel and pediment, and over this are two dormers. The flanking bays have shaped gables, and contain wide two-storey canted bay windows with dentilled cornices, above which is a four-light mullioned window. The narrow outer bays contain a window in each lower floor.	II
Gateway, Beverley Westwood Hospital; 53.84161°N 0.43847°W		1895	The gateway consists of an archway in red brick with stone dressings. The entry has a moulded round arch with a mask keystone. Above it is a gable with a segmental pediment and scrolls at the ends, containing a circular window with a keystone. Inside, the arch is barrel vaulted and lined with wood.	II
Beverley Library and Art Gallery; 53.84032°N 0.42966°W		1904–10	The public library and art gallery, which were later extended, are in red brick, with sandstone banding, stone and terracotta dressings, and mainly tiled roofs. The original block has three bays flanked by end bays with shaped gables, and to the right is an entrance bay. Recessed on the right is a later gabled range, linked by a two-storey block. The entrance bay has a distyle Ionic portico, above which is a mullioned and transomed bay window, and a copper-covered roof.	II
36 Lairgate; 53.84185°N 0.43260°W		Undated	A shop on a corner site in brick, the front rendered, on a plinth, with a cornice and a pantile roof. There is one storey and an attic, and a front of one bay. On the front is a mid-19th-century shopfront with pilasters, an entablature and a cornice, above which is a gabled dormer breaking through the eaves.	II

== See also ==
- Listed buildings in Beverley (central and northeast areas)
- Listed buildings in Beverley (south area)
- Listed buildings in Beverley (southeast area)
- Listed buildings in Beverley (north area)
