= Old School House, Beverley =

Building in Beverley, East Riding of Yorkshire, England

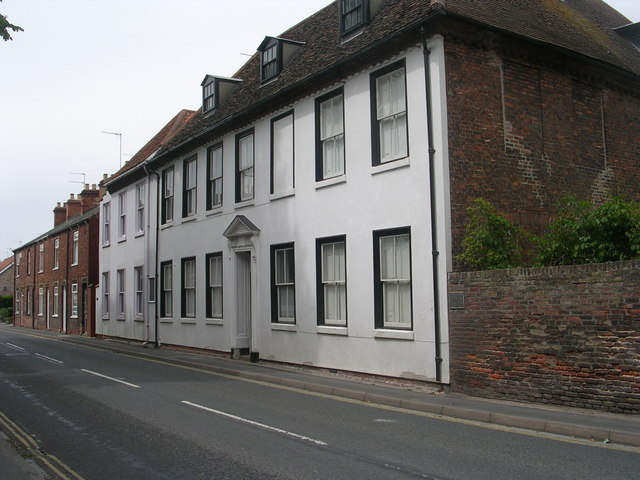
The building, in 2011

The Old School House is a historic building in Beverley, a town in the East Riding of Yorkshire, in England.

The house was constructed around 1696, for the Constable family. In the early 18th century, the front to Keldgate was rebuilt, and it was further altered later in the century. The house was later acquired for the headteacher of Beverley Grammar School, and between 1816 and 1817 the school moved to a neighbouring site. The school closed in 1878, but soon refounded on another site, and in 1913 the Old School House was converted into accommodation for its boarders, before later becoming a private house once more. The building was grade II* listed in 1950.

The front of the house is stuccoed, and has a moulded bracketed eaves cornice. There are two storeys and seven bays. The central doorway has an architrave, chambranles, a fanlight, moulded consoles, a frieze, a central tablet, and a dentiled pediment. The windows are reglazed, and there are three gabled dormers. The garden front is in brick with a hipped tile roof and five bays. Inside, the house has its original main and rear staircases, and one room on each floor has panelling and chimneypieces from 1770. Two further rooms on the first floor have chimneypieces with paintings of landscapes above, and the ground floor has further panelling and a peat-burning fireplace.

== See also ==
- Grade II* listed buildings in the East Riding of Yorkshire
- Listed buildings in Beverley (west and southwest areas)
