= Ann Routh's Almshouses =

Building in Beverley, East Riding of Yorkshire, England

Coordinates: 53°50′18″N 0°25′38″W

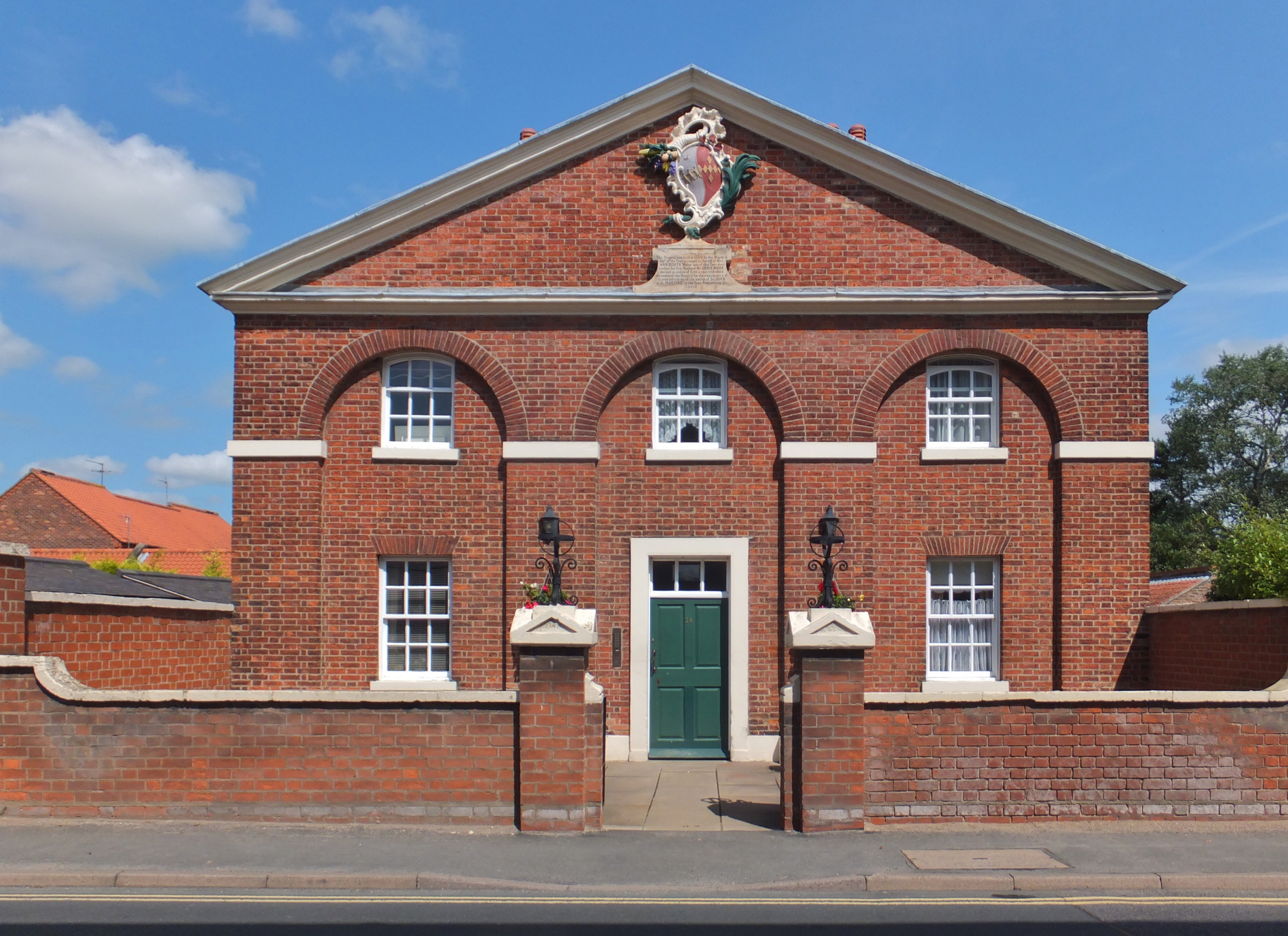
The building, in 2015

Ann Routh's Almshouses is a historic building in Beverley, a town in the East Riding of Yorkshire, in England.

Ann Routh died in 1722 and left a bequest for the construction of an almshouse. The building was not constructed until 1749, when it was built to a design by James Moyser. It initially housed 12 poor widows, and in 1788 was extended to accommodate another eight women. In 1810, a further extension took the total capacity up to 30 women. The building was grade II listed in 1950. It continues to serve as an almshouse.

The building consists of a row of almshouses in red brick on a plinth with two storeys. The entrance front facing the street has three bays, each with semicircular gauged arch on pilasters. In the centre is a doorway with a plain architrave and a three-light rectangular fanlight, and elsewhere are sash windows with flat gauged brick heads. Above is a moulded cornice and a pediment containing a Rococo cartouche of arms above an inscribed tablet. Inside there is a staircase, built in the early 19th century but replicating the design of the original stairs.

== See also ==
- Listed buildings in Beverley (west and southwest areas)
