= Norwich Medical School =

Medical school at the University of East Anglia

- Motto: Latin: Omnium artium medicina nobilissima est (Medicine is the noblest of all arts)
- Type: Medical school
- Established: 2002
- Parent institution: University of East Anglia
- Dean: Professor Kristian Bowles OBE
- Director: Professor Philip Baker DM FRCOG FMedSci
- Students: 1,040 (2023)
- Location: Norwich, Norfolk, England
- Website: https://www.uea.ac.uk/about/norwich-medical-school

Norwich Medical School is a medical school based at the University of East Anglia, in Norwich, England. It is part of the Faculty of Medicine and Health Sciences at the university. The first intake of students was in 2002. The school has a 5-year MBBS course, with the possibility of intercalation after year 3 or 4. The school is ranked 25th best medical school in the UK. In the most recent Research Excellence Framework assessment, 91% of research at the school was rated as "world leading" or "internationally excellent".

== History ==
In July 2000 the University of East Anglia Medical School was announced. The medical school opened in 2002 as part of the School of Medicine, Health Policy and Practice. The first intake of 110 students was in 2002, of whom 56% were not straight from school.

In March 2018, the MBBS programme at the medical school was anticipated to expand from 167 to 208 places per year by 2019 as part of a government plan to increase training places within the UK.

== Courses ==
Norwich Medical School offers two undergraduate courses: a five-year MBBS and a six-year MBBS with a foundation year. Students must complete the foundation year to a satisfactory standard before progressing to the rest of the course; they join the five-year program after foundation.

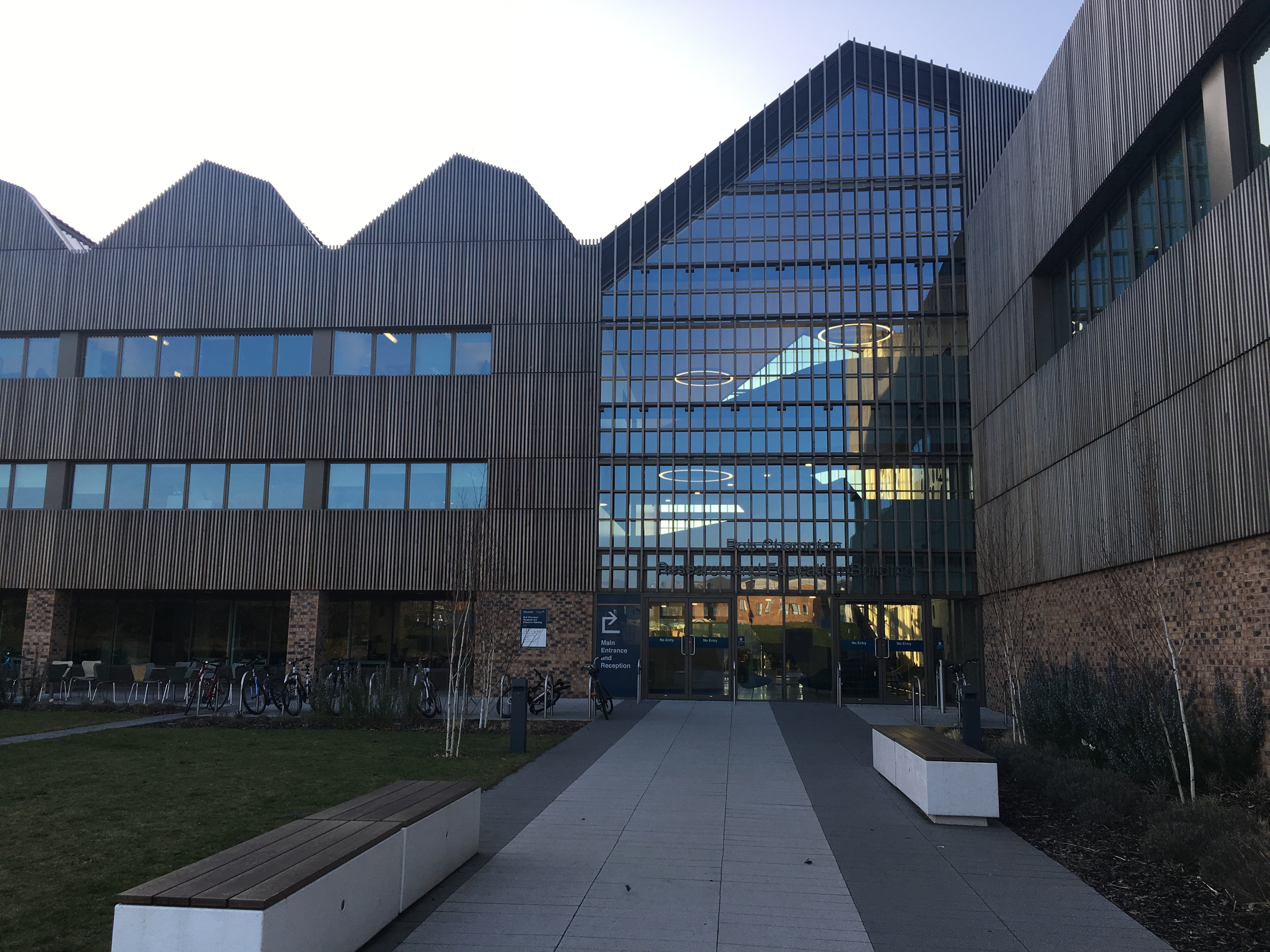
The Bob Champion Research and Education Building, the main site of Norwich Medical School

The Medical School also offers a number of postgraduate courses, the newest of which (Founded in 2016) is an MSc in Physician Associate Studies - which in 2016 is one of only 11 courses in the UK.

The Medical School also includes the Department for Clinical Psychology and Psychological Therapies (CPPT), which has grown significantly over recent years. The department includes the Doctorate in Clinical Psychology (ClinPsyD) training programme, first established in 1997, and a number of other postgraduate psychological practitioner programmes including a Clinical Associate Psychologist (CAP) Degree Apprenticeship, IAPT (Improving Access to Psychological Therapies) training programmes (both the PWP (Psychological Wellbeing Practitioner) and HIT (High Intensity Therapist)), and the EMHP (Education Mental Health Practitioner) programme. These programmes are all strongly linked to local NHS services.

MBBS students undertake clinical rotations throughout their course at various general practice surgeries and the following hospitals: Norfolk and Norwich University Hospital, James Paget University Hospital, Colchester General Hospital, Queen Elizabeth Hospital King's Lynn, and Ipswich Hospital.

MBBS students must complete a series of assessments throughout the year in order to progress into the following year, including Objective Structured Clinical Examinations, written examinations, and other projects.

== Societies ==
The Medical School has various active medical societies, including the MedSoc which offers some education and social events. The MedSoc activities include "MedSoc's got talent" and MRAG week (Medicine Raising and Giving week). The society's selected charity for the 2016/17 academic year is "Medical Aid for Palestinians".

Norwich Medics Hockey Club (NMHC) is one of the popular sports clubs set up by medical students in 2010. They compete in the local league during the summer as well as representing the medical school in the National Association of Medical School (NAMS) hockey tournament each year. The medical student rugby club, Norwich Medics RFC, was established in 2005 by a group of medical students and continues to compete in the Eastern Counties league and local or inter-school competitions.

As of 2022 Norwich Medics Football play in the Central and South Norfolk League.

== Notable alumni ==
- Ibrahim Abubakar, Director of the UCL Institute for Global Health
- Leah Totton, winner of series nine of The Apprentice

== Notable faculty ==
- Colin Cooper, cancer researcher
- Marcus Flather, cardiologist and recognised expert in clinical trials
- Michael Frenneaux, cardiologist
- Amanda Howe, General Practitioner and President of the World Organisation of Family Doctors
- Paul Hunter, microbiologist
- Sir Tom Shakespeare, 3rd Baronet, sociologist
- Ailsa A. Welch, nutritional epidemiologist
