= East Riding Community Hospital =

Hospital in the East Riding of Yorkshire, England

- Humber Teaching NHS Foundation Trust
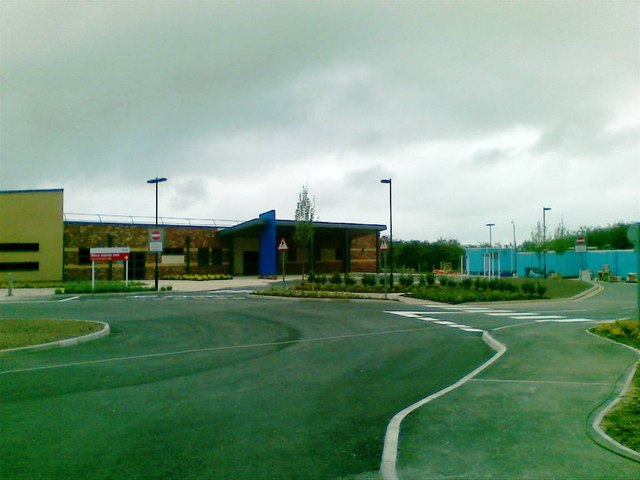
- East Riding Community Hospital

- Shown in the East Riding of Yorkshire

Geography
- Location: Swinemoor Lane, Beverley, East Riding of Yorkshire, England
- Coordinates: 53.8525°N 0.4139°W

Organisation
- Care system: National Health Service
- Type: Community Hospital

Services
- Emergency department: No, Urgent Treatment Centre only
- Beds: 36

History
- Founded: 2012

Links
- Lists: Hospitals in England

East Riding Community Hospital is a health facility in Swinemoor Lane, Beverley, East Riding of Yorkshire, England. It is managed by Humber Teaching NHS Foundation Trust.

== History ==
The hospital was commissioned to replace the ageing Westwood Hospital. It was built by Interserve at a cost of £19 million and opened in July 2012. In early 2015 the number of beds provided was increased from 26 to 36 to meet a surge in demand.
