= Beverley High School =

Community school in Beverley, East Riding of Yorkshire, England

Location
- Norwood; Beverley, East Riding of Yorkshire, HU17 9EX; England; 53.8462°N 0.4305°W

Information
- Type: Community school
- Motto: Pietas
- Established: 1908
- Department for Education URN: 118072 Tables
- Ofsted: Reports
- Head teacher: Sharon Japp
- Age: 11 to 18
- Enrolment: 852 pupils
- Website: http://www.beverleyhigh.net/

Beverley High School is a girls' comprehensive school in Beverley, East Riding of Yorkshire, England.

According to government league tables for 2018, it was the highest performing secondary school in the East Riding of Yorkshire, with a Progress 8 score of "well above average". In 2021 the school was rated as "Outstanding” by Ofsted, and "Outstanding" in every category including 6th form.

Beverley High School shares a joint sixth form with Beverley Grammar School.

== History ==
Beverley High School opened on 23 September 1908. In 1933 its head was Ethel Sandford, whose mother, Margaret Sandford, had been head of The Queen's School in Chester.

The school celebrated its 100th anniversary in 2008. Some of the school buildings were constructed in 1875, as part of St Mary’s School, which became part of Beverley High School when it opened.

In 2026, the school attracted national media attention after it was sued for allegedly admitting a transgender student.

== Curriculum ==
=== Key Stage 3/4 ===
Beverley High School is a five-form comprehensive school for girls, with key stage 3 and 4 for those aged 11–16. At the end of this period, pupils sit the GCSE exams. The school currently has 845 pupils on their roll.

=== Sixth form ===
The Joint Sixth Form is the final stage before pupils leave school to either seek further education or employment, and is conducted jointly with Beverley Grammar School. Pupils split their time between the two schools. During the Sixth Form pupils sit only A2 exams. The sixth form also accepts pupils who have previously attended other schools.

== Notable alumni ==
- Eleanor Tomlinson (2003–2009), Actress
- Lindsey Chapman (1995–2002), TV and radio presenter
- Anna Maxwell Martin (1988–1995), Actress
- Sue Hearnshaw (1972–1979), Athlete
- Hilda Lyon, Engineer, inventor, after whom one of the school's Houses is named
