= Ibrahim Abubakar =

British-Nigerian infectious disease researcher

Ibrahim Abubakar FMedSci FRCP FFPH
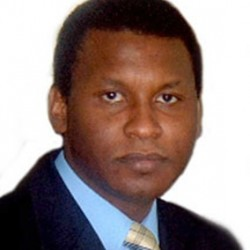
- Education: London School of Hygiene & Tropical Medicine; University of Cambridge; University of East Anglia
- Scientific career
- Fields: Epidemiology and global health
- Workplaces: University College London; University of East Anglia
- Thesis: An epidemiological investigation of the role of mycobacterium avium subspecies paratuberculosis in the aetiology of Chrohn's disease (2007)
- Website: https://iris.ucl.ac.uk/iris/browse/profile?upi=IABUB15

Ibrahim Ibrahim Abubakar is a British epidemiologist who is Vice Provost (Health) and Professor of Infectious Disease Epidemiology at University College London. He was Pro-Provost (Health) and Dean of the Faculty of Population Health Sciences.

== Education ==
He qualified in medicine in 1992 from Ahmadu Bello University and initially trained in general medicine before specialising in public health medicine. He trained in public health at the London School of Hygiene and Tropical Medicine graduating with an MSc in 1999, DPH from the University of Cambridge in 2000 and a PhD from the University of East Anglia in 2007.

== Work ==
He was director of the UCL Institute for Global Health until August 2021. He previously served as head of TB at Public Health England. Prior to his appointment at UCL, he was Professor in Health Protection at Norwich Medical School. In 2011, he was awarded a Senior Research Fellowship by the National Institute for Health and Care Research (NIHR) on tuberculosis and in 2016 he was appointed as an NIHR Senior Investigator.

He was elected to the Fellowship of the Academy of Medical Sciences in 2020 in recognition of his research in infectious disease epidemiology and migration and health. In 2025, he was elected member of the US National Academy of Medicine.

He was the chair of the NIHR Global Professorship Selection Committee, and currently chairs the NIHR Senior Investigator Medical and Dental Sub-Committee and the Lancet Migration Initiative. He was an Advisory Board member of the Public Health Board of Open Society Foundation and of the MRC Applied Global Health Board. He is also on the Editorial Board of BMC Medicine.

He is a member of the Global Preparedness Monitoring Board. and was a non-executive member of the North Central London Integrated Care Board until 2025.

He served as the chair of the WHO Strategic and Technical Advisory Group for Tuberculosis (STAG TB) from 2016 to 2019 and co-chaired the NICE TB guidelines development group, and was a board member, Africa Research Excellence Fund.

In 2023, the Institute for Health Metrics and Evaluation awarded Professor Abubaker the Roux Prize for his dedication to improving health outcomes over the prior three decades.

== Research and publications ==
Abubakar led the Lancet Nigeria Commission which was launched in March 2022 in Abuja with media coverage and has influenced national health policy in Nigeria including the recent passage of the National Health Insurance Authority Act 2022. He led the UCL-Lancet Commission on Migration and Health which dispelled myths regarding the perceived threat from migration to public health and urged action on improved health provision for migrants. The results were especially topical in the context of mass migration in the Mediterranean and in central and North America. The findings of the commission achieved widespread media coverage, such as reports in The Guardian, NBC News, and at the World Economic Forum. In 2022, he co-edited a textbook on refugee health.

He co-edited the Oxford Specialist Handbook in Infectious Disease Epidemiology published in 2016. His work on mass gathering medicine in 2012 as part of the Lancet infectious Diseases Mass Gathering Medicine Series generated media interest due to the potential impact of pandemics in crowded settings (London 2012: Mass gathering risks disease spreading).

He is widely published in tuberculosis epidemiology, diagnosis and control with media coverage including research on tuberculosis screening, work showing high risk of TB in pregnancy and the postpartum period, tuberculosis and air travel, and on the effects of BCG in TB prevention. He leads the E-DETECT TB project in Europe for the early detection of tuberculosis, which in Romania has led to the expansion of mobile x-ray screening through €15 million investment in similar units to travel around the country. He is currently the coordinator of the END-VOC EU funded international consortium of cohort studies on covid-19 variants.

He has an h-index of 100 according to Google Scholar.

== Other activities ==
- Africa Europe Foundation (AEF), Member of the Strategy Group on Health (since 2020)
- Nigeria National Malaria Advisory Committee, Member
