= Beverley Grammar School =

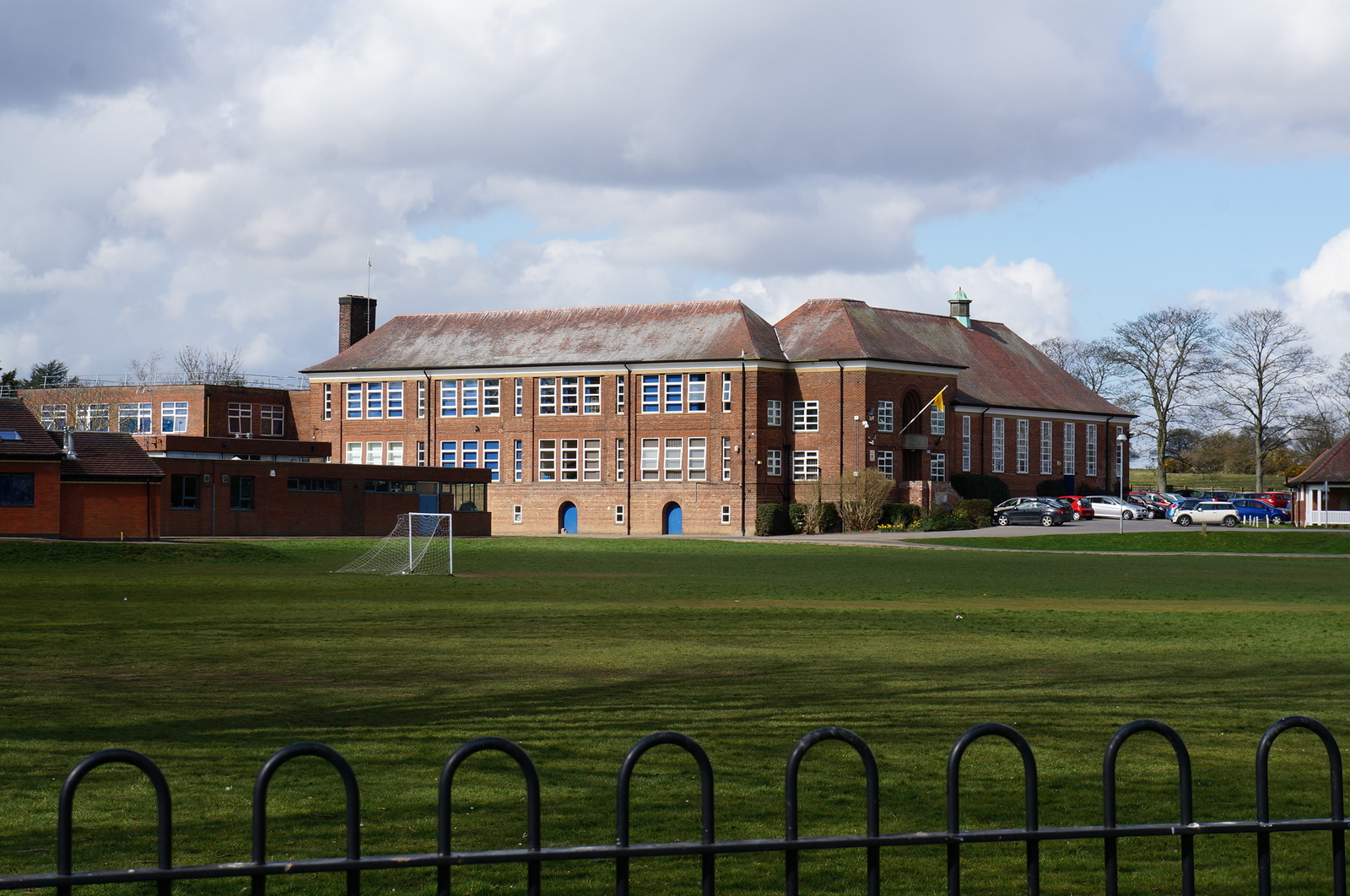
- School badge Beverley Grammar School, Queensgate, in 2015

Location
- Queensgate; Beverley, East Riding of Yorkshire, HU17 8NF; England; 53.8336°N 0.4395°W

Information
- Type: 11–16 boys Academy; Comprehensive School
- Motto: Latin: Adolescentiam alunt senectutem oblectant ([Study] sustains youth and entertains old age)
- Established: AD c. 700; 1326 years ago
- Founder: St John of Beverley
- Specialist: Engineering
- Department for Education URN: 136995 Tables
- Ofsted: Reports
- Gender: Boys
- Age: 11 to 16
- Enrolment: 863 pupils (approx.)
- Houses: 6 (Burden, Connington, Fisher, Minster, School, Westwood*)
- Publication: Beverlonian
- Website: Beverley Grammar School

Beverley Grammar School is an 11–16 boys’ comprehensive secondary academy school in Beverley, East Riding of Yorkshire, England. The origins of Beverley Grammar School may date back to about the year 700 AD; and the school is thus claimed to be the country's oldest grammar school, and the eighth oldest school in the world of any kind, but the existence of a school here is not continuous.

The school shares a joint sixth form with Beverley High School, styled as "Beverley Joint 6th". The teaching is done by the staff of the two schools.

The school has received an 'Outstanding' in Ofsted inspections in 2006, 2008, and in 2010. However it was unable to sustain such a high level record when deemed 'requires improvement' in 2013. The school was re-awarded 'outstanding' in September 2021.

The headmaster is Gavin Chappell, who took over from Gillian Todd in September 2015.

== History ==
=== Establishment ===
The school was probably established c. 700 AD, as part of the foundation of Beverley Minster, and claims to be the oldest grammar school in England. The exact date of the foundation of the Minster is uncertain, but it was probably in existence by the tenth century. Ketell’s Miracles of St John, dating from around the year 1100, refers to a schoolmaster at Beverley. In 1306, the records of the chapter of the Minster record the appointment of a new master of the grammar school (scolas gramaticales).

Masters of singing and grammar were employed at Beverley more or less continuously during the Middle Ages. The school disappeared at the time of the dissolution of the monasteries. In 1552, the burgesses of Beverley petitioned the Crown for land worth £60 for the maintenance of the Minster and also for the establishment of a new grammar school, as the town then had a population of about 5,000, but no school. It is unclear exactly when a new school was founded, but a schoolmaster is referred to in the town’s accounts for 1562, and in 1575 the town paid his whole salary. Early records suggest that the medieval building of the school, which was in the southwest corner of the Minster grounds, was demolished in 1602 before being replaced on the same site by a stone building in 1609. The 1609 building eventually fell into disrepair, and in 1816 the school was moved to a site adjacent to the headmaster's house on Keldgate. Following a local government reorganisation, there was a temporary closure of the school in 1886, but makeshift accommodation was found in Grayburn Lane, allowing the school to re-open in 1889.

A new site for the school was purchased in Queensgate in 1902, and the school moved again to another purpose-built building which would accommodate 70 students. The school's popularity had begun to increase, and by 1917, despite the ongoing First World War, the number of students reached 100. Temporary huts were erected which would allow access to provision for wooden physics laboratory, the ‘American Hut’ and shower, baths and changing rooms. In 1918, an Old Boys Memorial Fund was initiated in order to commemorate those who died during World War I. Nearly £1,200 was raised through the Old Boys Memorial Fund, and in 1928, a sports pavilion was built as a memorial to those who died in World War I on the school field.

=== Expansions ===
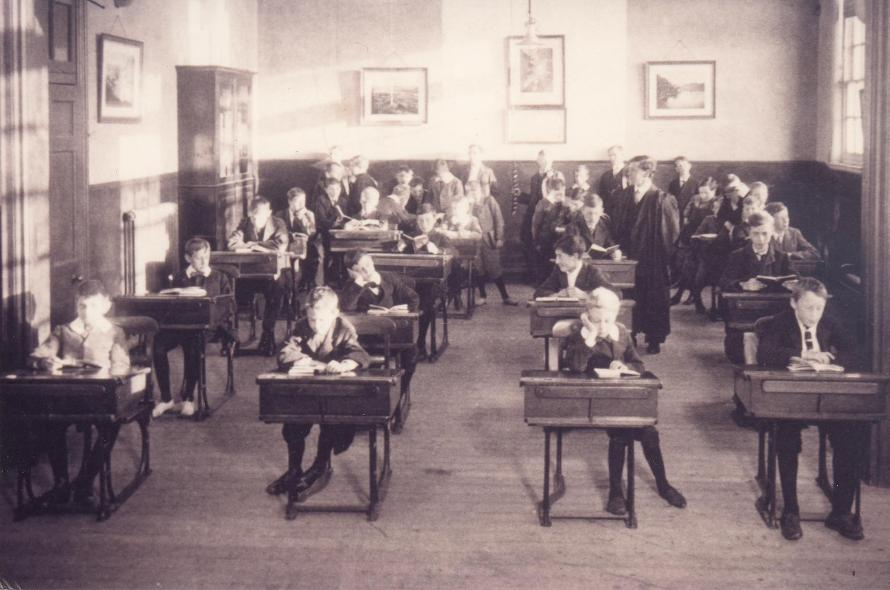
Boys at Beverley Grammar School during the 1930s

By 1936, a new building was erected on an adjacent site in Queensgate, with the original building being used for manual type lessons only, such as woodwork subjects. By 1965 the first extension, comprising a two-story science and sixth form block, was constructed, which was followed by an additional two-story extension including another laboratory and teaching rooms in 1976. A separate technology block was built in 1978 which was further extended in 1990 to include provision for subjects such as an I.T. suite, lecture theatre and home economics room. By 1980, a block of eight classrooms were constructed parallel to the west wing of the school building, and in 1985, a Sports Hall which included common room facilities for the sixth form students was erected. The classrooms at the north of the school were refurbished in 1981 which would allow for an extra science laboratory on the first floor.

A new expressive arts block for the school was constructed, being completed in October 1999, which includes four classrooms, music practice rooms, music teaching rooms and a drama studio. A new sixth form block incorporating a new Sixth Form common room, four new teaching rooms, two IT rooms, a private study room and offices for staff was completed and opened to staff and pupils in 2004. Additionally, in 2004, the Technology block was refurbished by re-arranging the blocks internal space, which allowed for an entrance room and hallway to be added.

=== Founders Day ===
Historically 3 June was recognised as Beverley Grammar School Founder's Day and was celebrated with a service attended by all pupils in Beverley Minster.

=== Relocation ===
One of its former locations was in the southwest corner of Beverley Minster’s churchyard. The stone building was in use 1609–1816, but a school building had been on the site since medieval times. In 1816/1817, the school moved away from the churchyard to a site next to the Schoolmaster’s house in 54 Keldgate, now a Grade II* listed building. Owing to lack of funds, it was closed in 1878, but a new school was founded in 1890 at the site of the Old Fire Station in Albert Terrace which also operated as a grammar school. It moved to Queensgate in 1902. The foundation stone of the main building that is currently part of the main school was laid in January 1936 by Col. Philip Saltmarshe. The building was opened by November 1936.

== Academic performance ==
In the school's Joint Sixth form 98% achieved a pass with 52% achieving A*/A/B grades in A levels in 2013. A quarter of all results were A or A*. The average point score per pupil is 812 points in 2013.

On 21 August 2014 the school announced on their website that 74% of their pupils had achieved an A* to C grade, additionally 1 in 4 of the pupils achieved 5A to A*.

As of November 2023, Beverley Grammar School was rated as "average" for academic performance against other schools in England, with a Process 8 score of 0.14. A pupil is considered to have entered for the English Baccalaureate (EBacc) if they entered for qualifications in English, Maths, Sciences, a language related subject, and either history or geography. For Beverley Grammar School, 21% of boys entered the EBacc, below the local authority average of 36% and the England average of 39%.

The percentage of boys who, upon leaving the school, stayed in education or entered employment stood at 98%, above the local authority average of 95% and the England average of 94%. The school performed well in regards to the number of boys who achieved a Grade 5 or above in English & Maths in GCSE examinations, with 61% of boys at the school achieving Grade 5 or above. This is above both the local authority and England average of 43% and 45% respectively. The schools Attainment 8 and EBacc average point score were above both the local authority and England average in 2023.

== Overview ==
=== School site ===
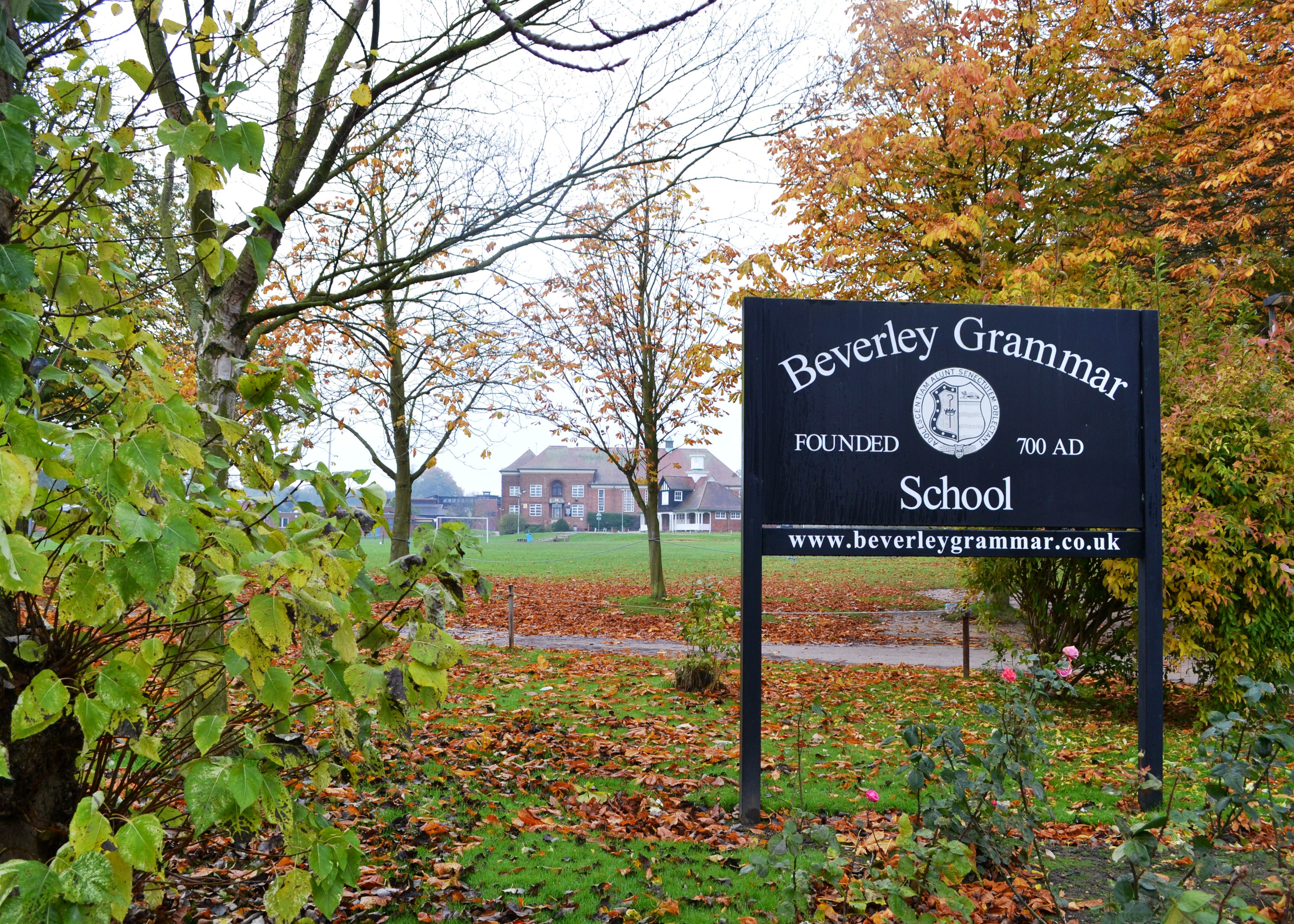
Signage at the entrance, with the school building in the background

The school premises are located at the junction of Queensgate and Sloe Lane in Beverley. The expressive arts block was completed in October 1999, and includes five English classrooms, music practice rooms, music teaching rooms and a drama studio. This was named after the former head of the school and the Chairman of Governors – Richard Michael Scrowston. The sixth form block incorporating a sixth form common room, teaching rooms, an ICT room, a private study room and offices for staff was opened in 2004. However, since this time, this block has been turned into a Maths block, with the old Maths rooms being used for a larger office space, English and Business Studies teaching and a careers library.

The school is based in Beverley, England and the Beverley Westwood can be seen from its rear classrooms and Science Department. The school's main building and reception are situated at the top of its drive with two main entrances at the front of the school site through its main gate and far path. The building consists of two main structures and a cluster of subject specific buildings surrounding it. The staff room, the main hall, Business Studies, the psychology classrooms and the Careers Room are situated in the main building. The Geography Department, Languages Section and a history room are in the smaller section of the main building. The Science Department are situated in both sections. Surrounding subjects are the Technology Department, the Maths Block, Sports Hall, Expressive Arts Department and the 6th form block.

=== Motto ===
The school motto, Adolescentiam alunt, senectutem oblectant, is taken from the Roman Statesman and writer Cicero's Pro Archia Poeta, a defence of the poet Aulus Licinius Archias against a charge of not being a Roman citizen. The full quote is Haec studia adolescentiam alunt, senectutem oblectant, secundas res ornant, adversis perfugium ac solacium praebent, delectant domi, non impediunt foris, pernoctant nobiscum, peregrinantur, rusticantur ("These studies sustain youth and entertain old age, they enhance prosperity, and offer a refuge and solace in adversity, they delight us when we are at home without hindering us in the wider world, and are with us at night, when we travel and when we visit the countryside.")

=== Houses ===
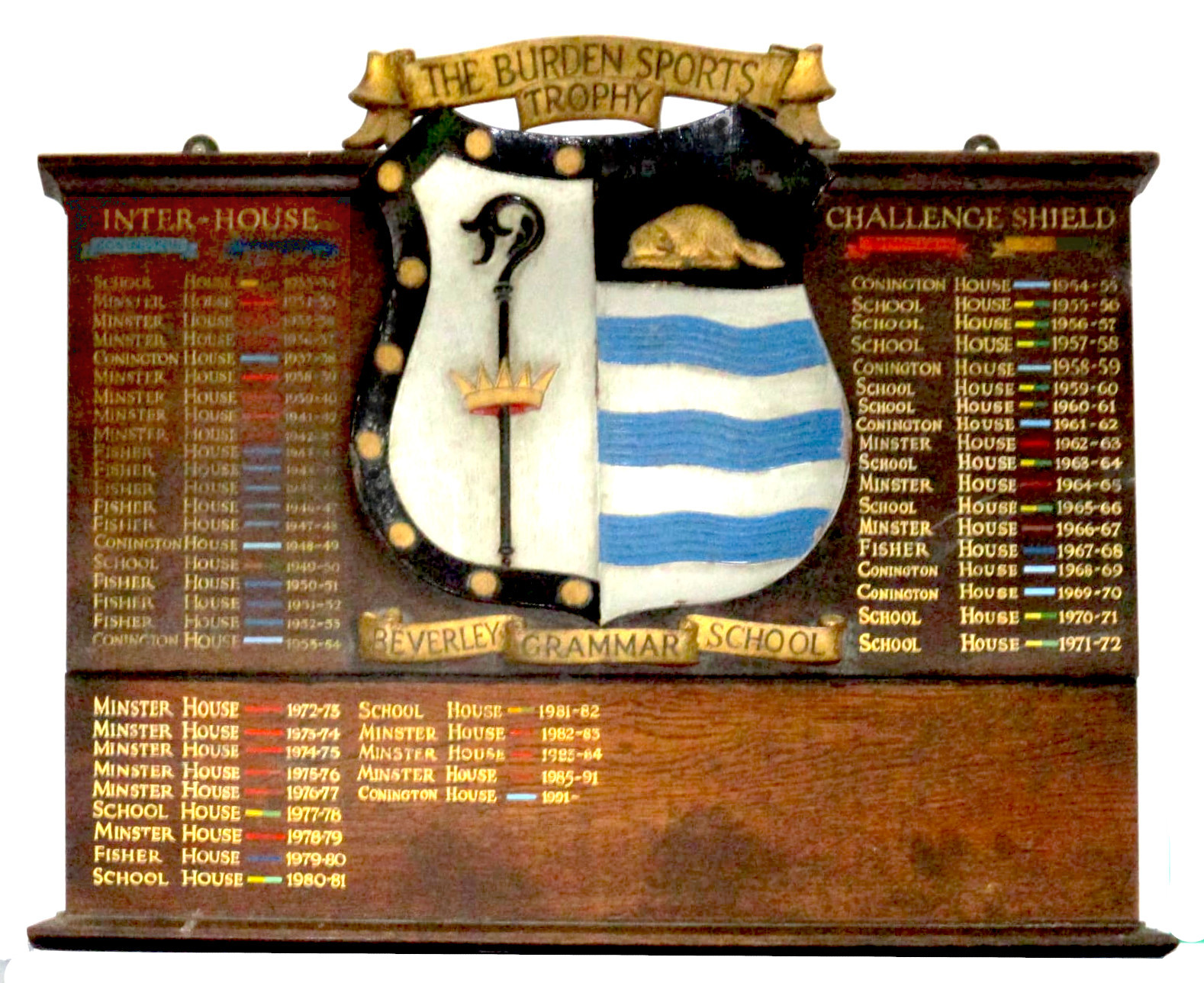
The Burden School Sports Trophy Inter House Challenge Shield 1933-1991

Since 1933 (at the latest according to the Burden School Sports Trophy) Beverley Grammar School had a 4-house system comprising Conington, Fisher, Minster and School. Form groups were streamed to academic performance and designated N, S, W and X.

In the late 1980s the form groups started being named after the four houses. In the 1990s the governors decided to increase the numbers in the school and move from a 4 Form system to a 5-form system. Burden House was then formed to fill the fifth house. The houses can be associated by their colours listed below.

- Burden – Gold

Burden House was named after Henry Burden who was the headmaster of the school between 1912 and 1935. He was largely seen as creating the modern school.

- Connington – Light Blue

John Conington (10 August 1825 – 23 October 1869) who was an English Classical Scholar.

- Fisher – Dark Blue

Fisher House was named after the Catholic martyr John Fisher who was born in Beverley in 1469. He became a Vice Chancellor of Cambridge University.

- Minster – Red

Minster House was named after Beverley Minster and commemorates the founding of the school in 700 AD by St John of Beverley in Beverley Minster.

- School – Green and Yellow (though House Ties are only Green)

This was named after the original school which started inside the Minster and then was moved to a building in the Minster grounds. It later moved to a site in a larger building down Keldgate and later Albert Terrace. In the 1903 it moved to this present site on Queensgate and was located in the building that is now the Art Block. The Main school building was erected in the 1930s and has been modernised and added to over the years.

- Westwood – Orange

Is only seen in one year group due to concerns of future enrolment sizes.

== Notable pupils ==
Before 1900

- John Alcock (1430–1500), Lord Chancellor of England
- Matthew Appleyard (c. 1660–1700), Tory member of parliament
- Sir Hugh Cholmeley, 1st Baronet (1600–1657), soldier in the English Civil War
- John Conington (1825–1869), English classical scholar
- William Howe De Lancey (1778–1815), the Duke of Wellington's Chief of Staff at the Battle of Waterloo
- Saint John Fisher (c. 1469–1535), Roman Catholic bishop
- Thomas Percy (1560–1605), Gunpowder plotter
- Smithson Tennant (1761–1815), chemist
- Michael Warton (died 1688), Royalist soldier and landowner

After 1900

- Kyle Edmund (born 1995), tennis player
- Michael Frenneaux (born 1957), cardiologist
- Neil Mallender (born 1961), England cricketer and international umpire
- Jim Ratcliffe (born 1952), chairman and CEO, Ineos, UK's richest man according to Sunday Times Rich List 2018
- Paul Robinson (born 1979), football goalkeeper
- John Andrew (1931–2014), Anglican clergyman in New York City
- Ken Annakin (1914–2009), film director
- Tony Topham (1929–2004), academic and writer

== See also ==
- List of the oldest schools in the United Kingdom
- List of schools in the East Riding of Yorkshire
