= Paul Hunter (microbiologist) =

British microbiologist

Paul Raymond Hunter is Professor in Medicine at the University of East Anglia. He was the first professor of health protection in the United Kingdom when he was appointed to the Norwich Medical School in 2001. He is a fellow of the Royal College of Pathologists, the Royal Society of Biology, and of the Faculty of Public Health.

He holds an MB ChB and MD from the University of Manchester and an MBA from the Open University. He has an h-index of 94 according to Google Scholar.
