= Colin Cooper (cancer researcher) =

Colin S. Cooper
- Education: University of Warwick; University of Birmingham
- Scientific career
- Workplaces: University of East Anglia; Institute of Cancer Research
- Thesis: The transcription of DNA by yeast RNA polymerase A (1978)

Colin S. Cooper is a leading cancer researcher who is currently Professor of Cancer Genetics at Norwich Medical School at the University of East Anglia.

Cooper studied science at the University of Warwick and completed his PhD in biochemistry at the University of Birmingham in 1978. He formerly worked at the Institute of Cancer Research, and was Chair of Molecular Biology at the University of London.

He was elected a Fellow of the Academy of Medical Sciences in 2004.

He has an h-index of 144 according to Google Scholar.
