= Michael Frenneaux =

Michael P. Frenneaux (11 February 1957) is a British cardiologist.

Born in Hull, he was educated at Beverley Grammar School and qualified from Westminster Medical School in 1980, where he was awarded the Gold Medal for the highest overall marks in the MBBS final examinations from the (then) 12 medical schools in the University of London.

He was Professor of Medicine at the University of Queensland before returning to the UK to become British Heart Foundation (BHF) Sir Thomas Lewis Chair of Cardiology at the University of Wales College of Medicine in 1996. He became British Heart Foundation Chair of Cardiovascular Medicine at the University of Birmingham in 2004, before being appointed Regius Professor of Medicine at the University of Aberdeen. He was made Head of Norwich Medical School at the University of East Anglia in 2015.

He was elected a Fellow of the Academy of Medical Sciences in 2008.
