= Door frame =

Structure supporting the area around a door

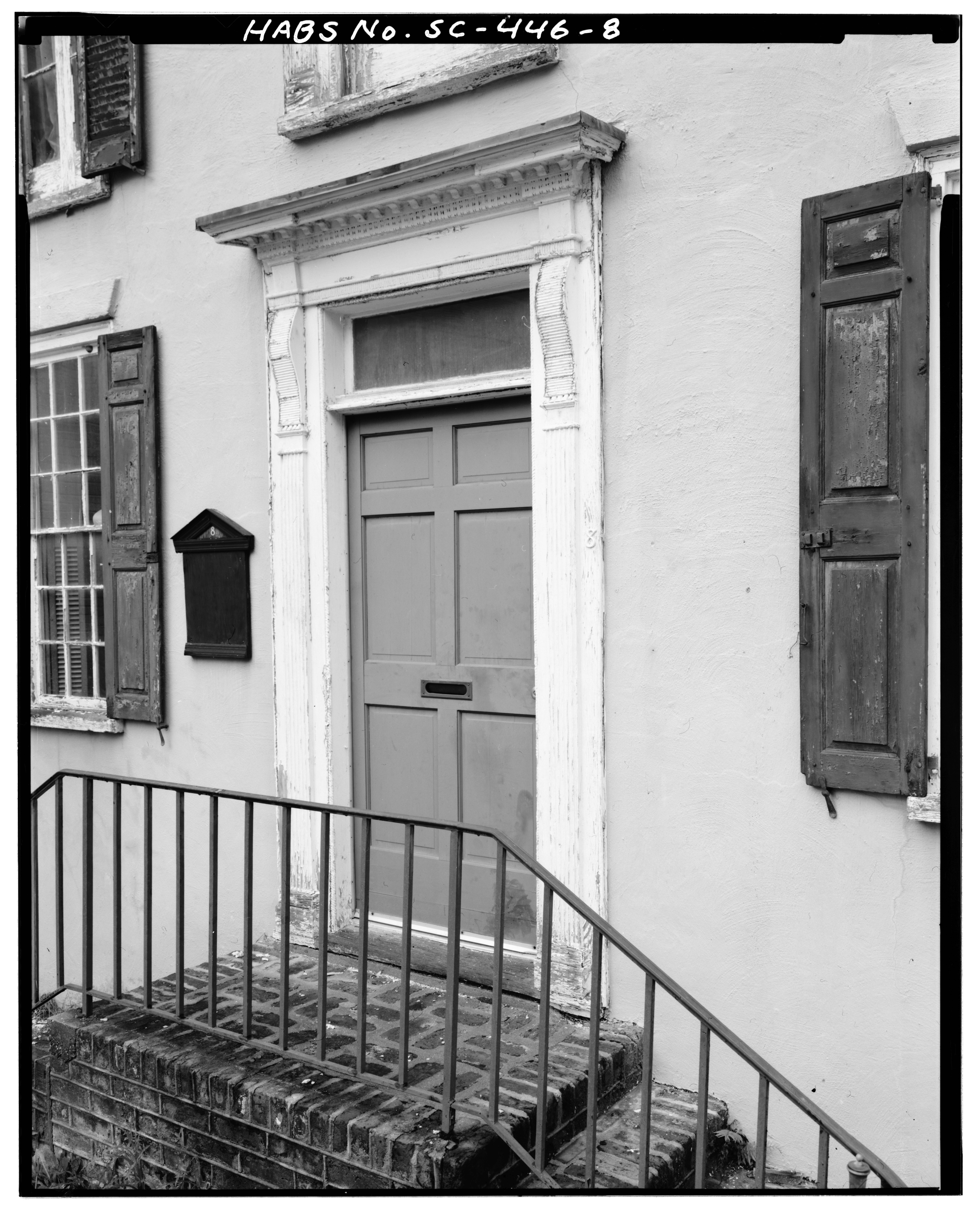
Entrance door and surround of a house in Charleston, South Carolina

A door frame, window frame, door surround, window surround, or niche surround is the architectural frame around an aperture such as a door or window.

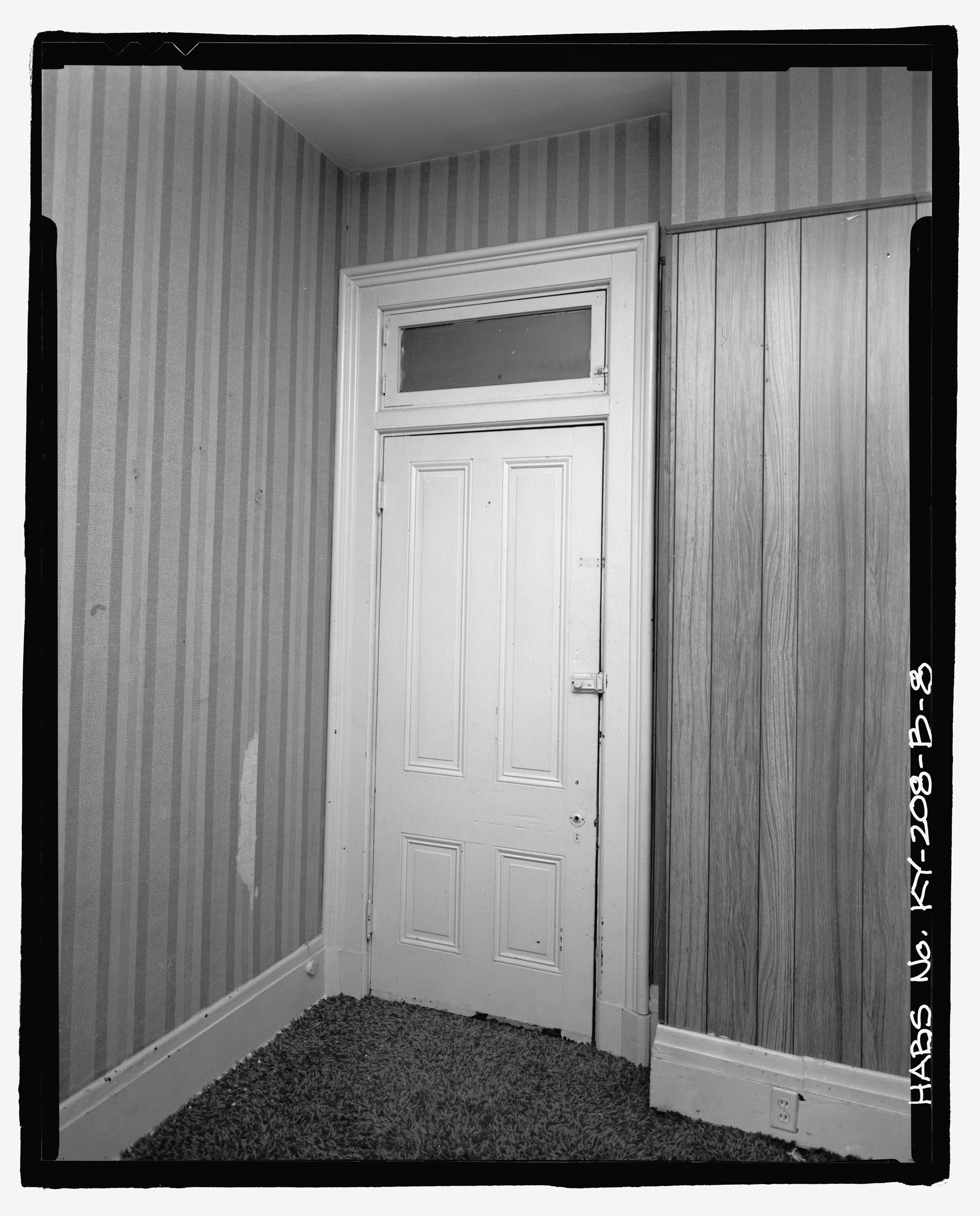
An interior doorway consisting of door, transom, and door surround in a historic house in Kentucky, United States

This may consist of separate pieces including jambs (side pieces) and lintel (top piece). A doorway may include side lights and/or a transom beside or above the door; the framing around the door and these may be considered to be part of one door frame or may better be termed a door surround.

The architectural term "surround" generally refers to a larger area around a doorway or window which provides a larger framing. One elaborate kind of door surround is the Gibbs surround, which is a type of banded "rusticated" architectural frame surrounding a door, window or niche in the tradition of classical architecture.

The term surround may be used to refer to just an ornamental border which encircles the sides and top of a door frame, or it may refer to the entire structure around a doorway.

A Palladian window is a particular kind of window surround structure including an arched central window and two shorter side windows. It is sometimes included in Renaissance Revival architecture, Classical Revival architecture, and Federal architecture, and is named for Andrea Palladio. In architectural contexts, the term surround may encompass the entire structure around a doorway, including ornamental borders encircling the sides and top of the door frame. Notable examples include the Gibbs surround, characterized by banded rustication, and the Palladian window surround, featuring an arched central window flanked by shorter side windows. Understanding the terminology and historical significance of door surrounds enriches appreciation of architectural design and craftsmanship.

== See also ==
- Chambranle
- Door furniture
