= Westwood Hospital =

Hospital in the East Riding of Yorkshire, England

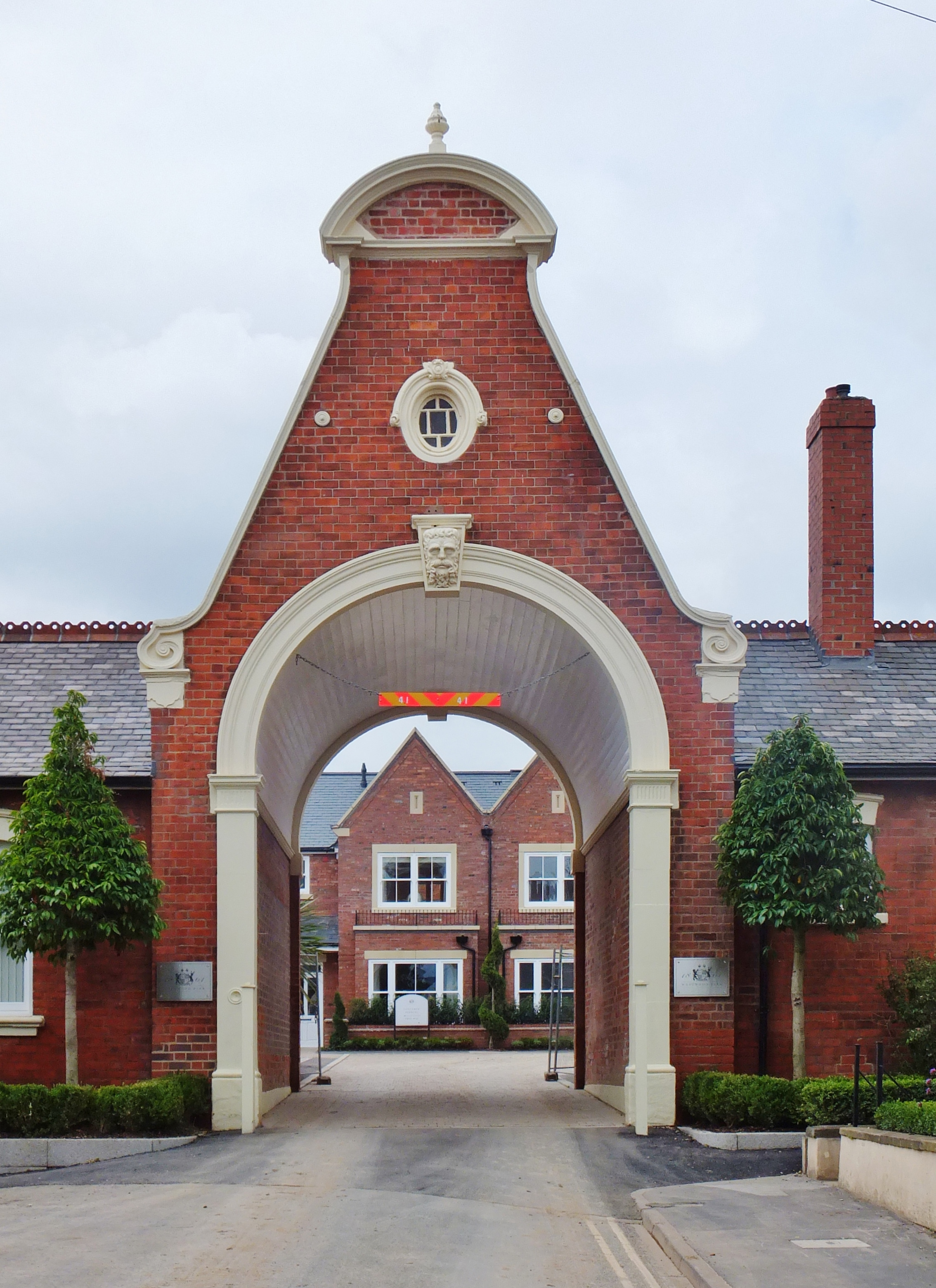
- Westwood Hospital

- Shown in East Riding of Yorkshire

Geography
- Location: The Woodlands, Beverley, East Riding of Yorkshire, England
- Coordinates: 53.8416°N 0.4385°W

Organisation
- Care system: NHS

Services
- Emergency department: No

History
- Founded: 1861
- Closed: 2012

Links
- Lists: Hospitals in England

Westwood Hospital was a health facility in The Woodlands, Beverley, East Riding of Yorkshire, England. Both the original block and the gateway are Grade II listed buildings.

== History ==
The hospital has its origins in the Beverley Union Workhouse which was designed by J. B. and W. Atkinson and opened in 1861. An infirmary was added in 1893 and the entrance arch was completed in 1895. It became the Beverley Public Assistance Institution in 1930 and joined the National Health Service as Westwood Hospital in 1948. After services transferred to the East Riding Community Hospital in July 2012, Westwood Hospital and the buildings were redeveloped for residential use by PJ Livesey as Westwood Park.

== Architecture ==
The original block is grade II listed. It is built of red brick, with stone dressings, rusticated quoins and a Welsh slate roof. It has two storeys, a central block of eleven bays, and projecting gabled wings. The central bay projects, and contains a doorway with a stone architrave and a cusped head. Above it is a rounded oriel window with mullioned and transomed windows, over which is a clock in a round surround, and a moulded gable with a finial and a bell. Two of the outer bays have a projecting gabled upper storey, and the windows are sashes.

The gateway is separately grade II listed, and consists of an archway in red brick with stone dressings. The entry has a moulded round arch with a mask keystone. Above it is a gable with a segmental pediment and scrolls at the ends, containing a circular window with a keystone. Inside, the arch is barrel vaulted and lined with wood.

== See also ==
- Listed buildings in Beverley (west and southwest areas)
