= Lindsey Chapman =

- Born: 1984 or 1985 (age 40–41); Beverley, England
- Occupations: Television and radio presenter

Lindsey Katherine Chapman (born 1984 or 1985) is an English television and radio presenter.

== Career ==
Chapman, the daughter of a teacher and a rural developer, was educated at Lockington primary school and Beverley High School before studying Drama and Theatre Arts at the University of Birmingham and later trained at Birmingham School of Acting. Growing up, she was a member of the Girl Guides.

In August 2015 Chapman hosted Big Blue UK, a series on UK marine wildlife, alongside Hugh Fearnley-Whittingstall for BBC One.

In January 2016, she co-hosted BBC Two's Winterwatch Unsprung with Chris Packham. She continued this role with Springwatch Unsprung in June 2016 and 2017 and in an online version of Winterwatch Unsprung in January 2017. Chapman has also presented Songs of Praise for the BBC and appeared on their wildlife-themed panel show Curious Creatures.

Since 2018 Chapman has presented series of Channel 5's Springtime on the Farm, Animals After Dark and Wild Animal Rescue.

On radio, Chapman has presented episodes of BBC Radio 4's Tweet of the Day and Tweet of the Week, Pick of the Week, Costing the Earth, Living World, Opening Night and In Pursuit of Beauty. She also presented the Contains Strong Language poetry special alongside Jeremy Irons and Julie Hesmondhalgh, part of the station's Hull UK City of Culture 2017 programming. Chapman has also hosted online arts coverage for the corporation for events such as the Edinburgh Festival Fringe, Shakespeare Lives, Opera Passion Day and Get Creative.

Chapman has worked as a travel reporter for BBC Radio 5 Live. In 2019, she commentated on international netball for the station and has previously presented coverage of matches for Sky Sports.

Chapman has been a patron of the Wild Watch programme in Nidderdale area of outstanding natural beauty, the Yorkshire Dales Millennium Trust, the City of Trees programme in Greater Manchester and the Wild Otter Trust. She has also presented at the Greater Manchester Green Summit and the Manchester Climate Change Conference. Chapman was also a torchbearer in the London 2012 Olympic Torch procession and in same year was part of BBC Radio 5 Live Guinness World Record attempt for the ‘most players in a continuous 5 a side exhibition match’ for BBC Children in Need.
