= Black Mill, Beverley =

Building in Beverley, East Riding of Yorkshire, England

Coordinates: 53.837°N 0.4502°W

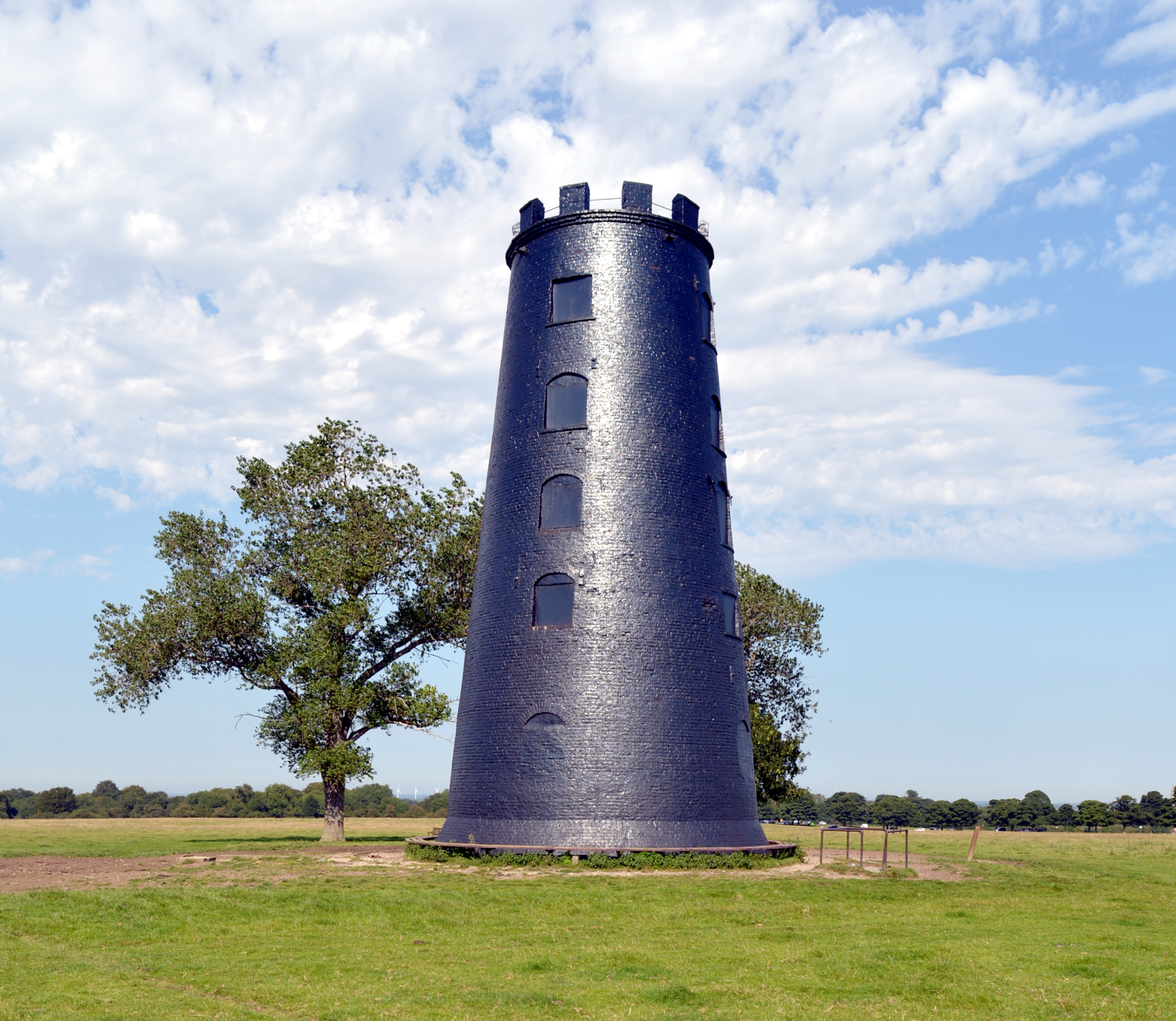
The building, in 2020

Black Mill is a historic building in Beverley, a town in the East Riding of Yorkshire, in England.

The Westwood pasture was given to the people of Beverley in 1380. Historically there were multiple windmills on the common, and one known as the "Far Mill" existed by the 1650s. In 1803, it was rebuilt by Gilbert Baitson, and was originally whitewashed, but later painted with tar, thus acquiring its current name. The mill suffered a fire in the 1860s, and when the lease expired in 1868, the machinery was removed and it was converted into a house. It has been unoccupied since 1934. The building was grade II listed in 1987.

The former windmill is built of tarred brick. It is circular and tapering, with five storeys, and has an embattled top.

== See also ==
- Listed buildings in Beverley (west and southwest areas)
