= Humber Teaching NHS Foundation Trust =

NHS community & mental health trust

- Type: Mental health trust
- Headquarters: Willerby Hill, Beverley Road, Willerby, England
- Region served: Hull, East Riding of Yorkshire
- Chair: Caroline Flint
- Chief executive: Michele Moran
- Website: www.humber.nhs.uk

Humber Teaching NHS Foundation Trust (formerly Humber NHS Foundation Trust) provides health and social care services to a population of almost 800,000 people across Hull, East Riding of Yorkshire, North Yorkshire, North Lincolnshire and North East Lincolnshire.

The trust offers a range of services including community and therapy services, mental health services for both community and inpatient settings, learning disability services, healthy lifestyle support, and addiction services.

It also encompasses Primary Care services, managing eight GP practices throughout its geographical area.

== Developments ==
In January 2020, the trust opened their new mental health inpatient unit in Hull, Inspire. The building won two Design in Mental Health Awards in August 2021.

The trust is also the lead provider at Whitby Community Hospital, which is currently undergoing renovation, and is set to complete in Spring 2022.

It was the first Mental Health Trust to use Lorenzo patient record systems part of the now discredited NHS Connecting for Health.

== Management ==
In September 2016 the trust announced the appointment of a new Chief Executive, Michele Moran, previously chief executive of the crisis-hit Manchester Mental Health and Social Care Trust which collapsed due to financial problems and had to be taken over by the neighbouring Greater Manchester Mental Health NHS Foundation Trust. The appointment of Michele Moran was criticised by local MP Lucy Powell as an example of "the NHS revolving door syndrome... I think the public would, rightly, ask whether someone who has just overseen such difficulty should just walk straight into another highly paid job".

In 2017 the trust appointed a new medical director John Byrne, previously Clinical Director at Southern Health from 2011 to 2014, a period in which an NHS England audit found evidence of a failure to investigate more than 1,000 deaths due to a "failure of leadership", eventually resulting in the trust being convicted in criminal court for "systemic failures" leading to the deaths of two patients in 2012 and 2014.

In May 2021 Caroline Flint was appointed chair of the trust.

== Performance ==
The hospital closed 18 of its 30 beds in July 2013 at East Riding Community Hospital in Beverley after a Care Quality Commission (CQC) report said 65% of its nurses were "not fully competent", but at an unannounced inspection in October 2013 it was found to have met the required standards.

In 2014 CQC inspectors found there were long waiting times for children and young people and that the trust was failing to meet four-hour targets for urgent referrals. Children requiring speech and language therapy were also facing long delays for treatment.

The trust won the mental health provider category in the 2019 Health Service Journal awards.

== See also ==
- List of NHS trusts
