= Marcus Flather =

Clinical Professor Norwich Medical School

Professor Marcus Flather FRCP
- Born: Marcus Denis Flather; 1957 (age 68–69)

Academic background
- Education: University College London (MD); University of East Anglia (MBA)

Academic work
- Discipline: Medicine
- Sub-discipline: Cardiology
- Institutions: McMaster University; Norwich Medical School

Marcus Denis Flather (born December 1957) is an American academic who is a clinical professor in medicine at Norwich Medical School. A specialist in cardiology, he is also a recognised expert in clinical trials.

== Education ==
Flather was educated at Rugby School. He graduated from the UCL Medical School in 1982 and trained in general medicine and cardiology in London and Oxford. He completed an MBA at the University of East Anglia in 2016.

== Career ==
Flather is a former director of the Clinical Trials and Evaluation Unit (CTEU) at the Royal Brompton and Harefield Hospitals. He has an h-index of 108 according to Google Scholar.
