= Warton's Hospital =

Almshouse in Beverley, East Riding of Yorkshire, England

Coordinates: 53°50′21″N 0°25′47″W

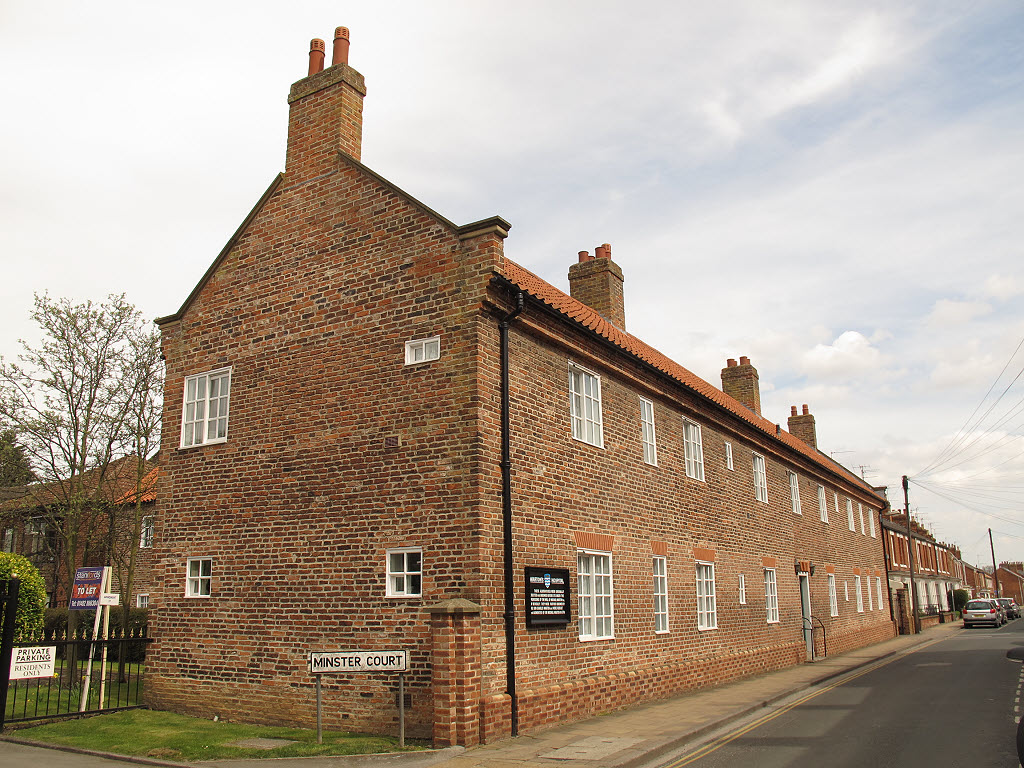
The building, in 2013

Warton's Hospital is a historic building in Beverley, a town in the East Riding of Yorkshire, in England.

Michael Warton died in 1688 and left £1,000 in his will for the construction of an almshouse. His son, Charles Warton, had the building constructed on Minister Moorgate, and it was completed in 1689. It was originally a single-storey building intended to house six poor widows. In 1774 a rear wing was added, then at some time in the 19th century a second storey added. By the middle of the century, it had accommodation for 14 widows. The building was grade II listed in 1950. It continues to serve as an almshouse, operated by the Beverley Housing Charity.

The almshouses are built of red brick on a plinth, with a moulded brick cornice, and a tile roof with moulded stone coped gables. They have two storeys and nine bays. In the centre is a doorway approached by steps with wrought iron rails, with a rusticated head. Most of the windows are horizontally sliding sashes with flat brick gauged heads, and there are smaller intermediate windows.

== See also ==
- Listed buildings in Beverley (west and southwest areas)
