= Union Mill, Beverley =

Windmill in Beverley, East Riding of Yorkshire, England

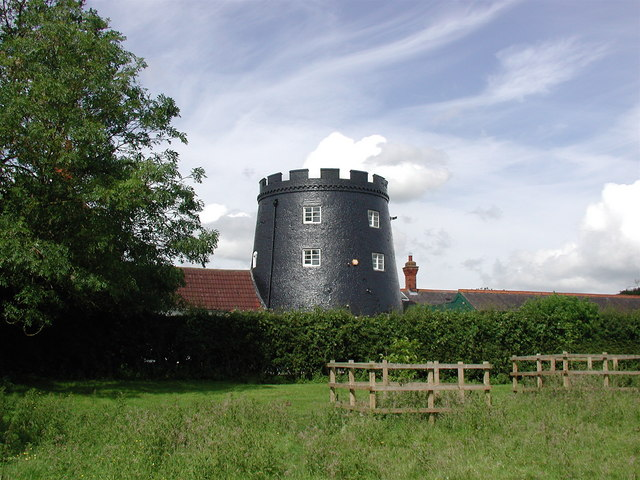
The building, in 2007

Union Mill is a historic building in Beverley, a town in the East Riding of Yorkshire, in England.

The mill was constructed between 1800 and 1804 by the Beverley Union Mill Society. This was a co-operative organisation, and the windmill was nicknamed the "Anti-Mill". The co-operative dissolved in the 1860s, due to disagreements in the management committee. It was instead leased by James Thirsk, who used it to produce his Beverlac brand flour. The mill closed in the early 1890s, and in 1906 was converted to become a new clubhouse for the Beverley and East Riding Golf Club.

The former windmill is built of tarred brick. It is circular and tapering, with three storeys, and has an embattled top. It has been grade II listed since 1987.

== See also ==
- Listed buildings in Beverley (west and southwest areas)
