= Newbegin House =

Building in Beverley, East Riding of Yorkshire, England

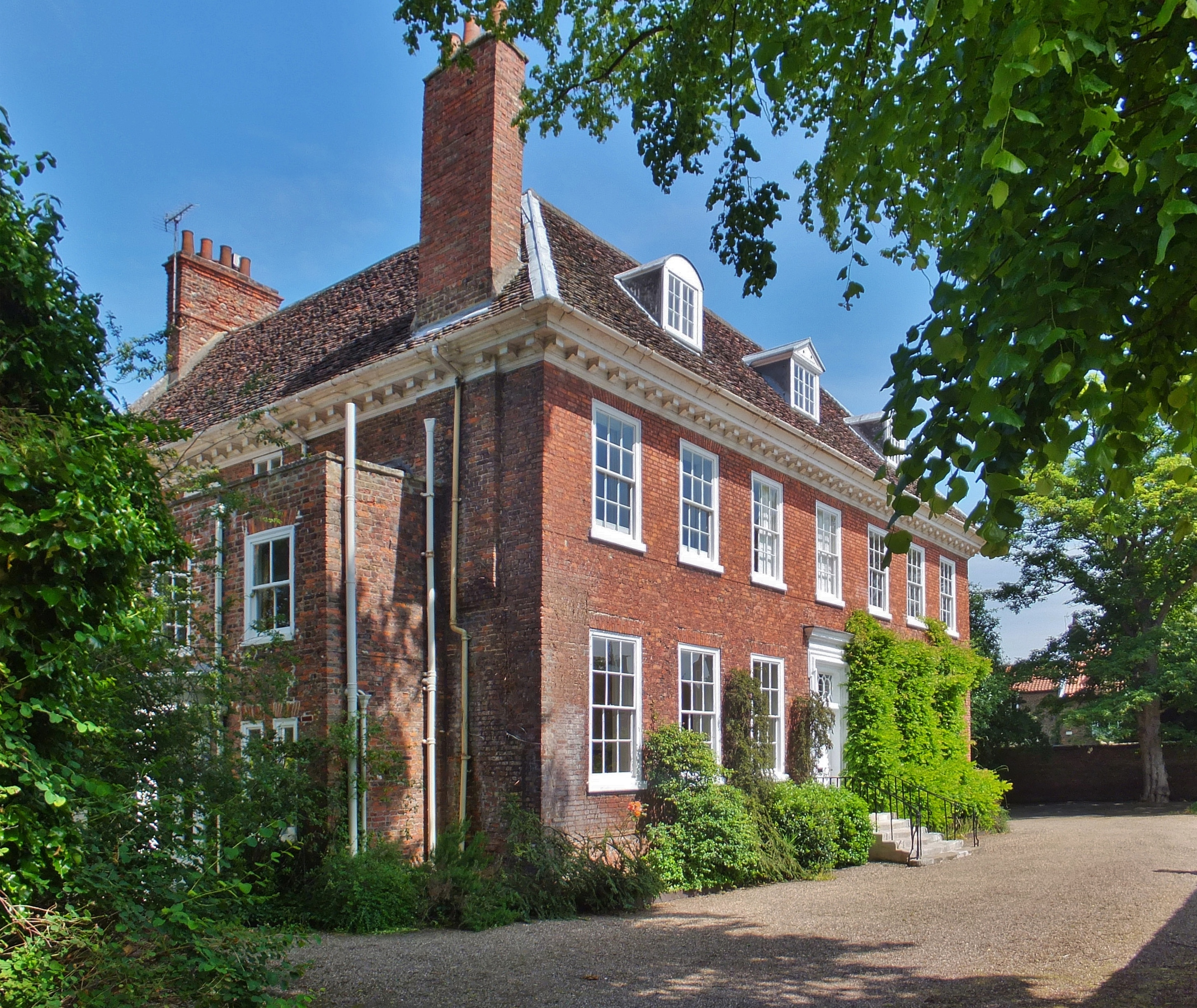
The building, in 2015

Newbegin House at 14 and 16 Newbegin is a historic building in Beverley, a town in the East Riding of Yorkshire, in England.

The house was built in about 1689, probably for Charles Warton. From 1771, it was the house of John Courtney. It had a large garden, which in the 19th century was replanted in the villa style. The house was divided into two early that century, but was later restored and converted back into a single house. The building has been grade II* listed since 1950.

The house is built of red brick, with a shaped bracketed eaves cornice, and a hipped tile roof. It has two storeys and attics, and is seven bays wide. Steps with a wrought iron rail and scrapers lead up to the central doorway that has a moulded shouldered architrave, a traceried fanlight, a pulvinated frieze and a cornice. The windows are sashes with flat gauged brick arches, and on the roof are three dormers, the central one with a pediment, and the outer ones with rounded heads. Inside, both the main and back staircases are original, and there are stone flags and panelling in the hall. Other internal details mostly date from around 1810.

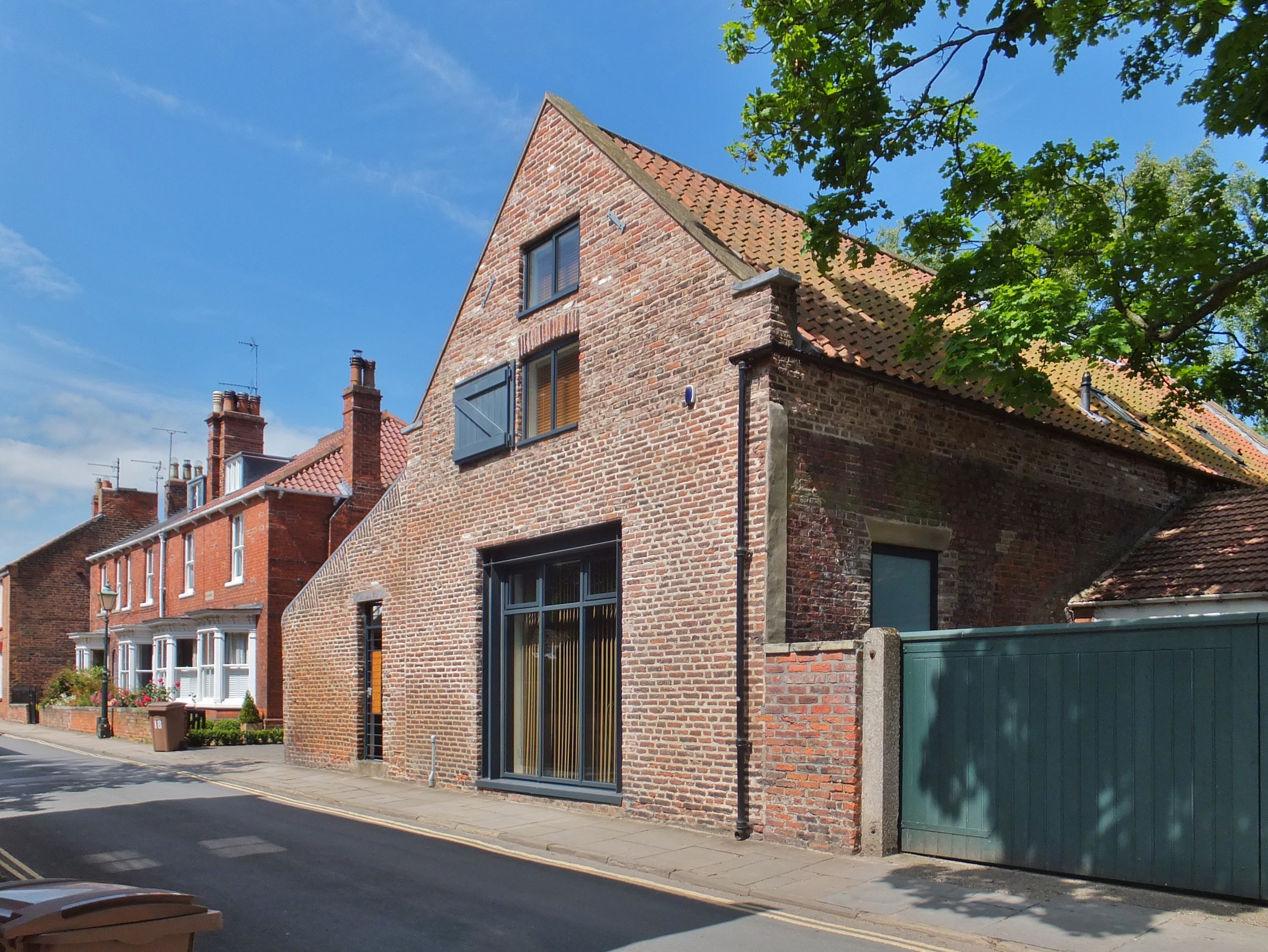
The former stables

The former stable block was built in the 18th century and is grade II listed. It has been converted for residential use, and is built of brick with a steep pantile roof. The gable end faces the road, and contains tall carriage doors, above which is a hoist door and a window. On the left is a later extension under a catslide roof containing a doorway.

== See also ==
- Grade II* listed buildings in the East Riding of Yorkshire
- Listed buildings in Beverley (west and southwest areas)
