= Ailsa A. Welch =

British academic scientist

Professor Ailsa A. Welch
- Education: BSc, D.Phil.
- Known for: Adviser to UK government for dietary surveys
- Scientific career
- Fields: Nutritional epidemiology, and nutrition and aging
- Institutions: Norwich Medical School (University of East Anglia)
- Website: www.uea.ac.uk/medicine/people/profile/a-welch

Ailsa A. Welch is a British medical researcher who is professor of nutritional epidemiology at Norwich Medical School (part of the University of East Anglia) in the UK. Her research focuses on the impact of human nutrition on health, disease and aging. She is listed as a notable scientist in Thomson Reuters' Highly Cited Researchers 2014, ranking her among the top 1% most cited scientists.

== Education ==
In 1977, Welch obtained a Bachelor of Science degree (BSc, Hons, 2.1) in nutrition. She obtained a Doctorate from the University of Ulster in 2005, and in 2009 she obtained a Postgraduate Certificate in Higher Education Practice.

== Career ==
Welch was a senior research nutritionist associate at the Department of Public Health and Primary Care at the University of Cambridge for 15 years, from October 1993 to October 2007, where she was a researcher for the European Prospective Investigations into Cancer Study. While in Cambridge, she was also an information scientist at the Royal Society of Chemistry and a research nutritionist at the MRC Human Nutrition Research institute.

In October 2007, Welch became a reader in nutritional epidemiology at Norwich Medical School at the University of East Anglia, where her research focuses on the impact of human nutrition on health, disease and ageing, particularly on the musculoskeletal system and public health, and the role of fat composition, nutritional methodologies and acid–base homeostasis.

Welch is a registered Public Health Nutritionist and, since 1979, has been a State Registered Dietitian (SRD) (No. DT 2305). She has also advised the UK government in relation to dietary surveys.

== Publications ==
Welch has over 190 peer-reviewed publications. Recent articles include:

- 2015 Lentjes, M. A. H., Welch, A. A., Keogh, R. H., Luben, R. N., Khaw, K. Opposites don't attract: high spouse concordance for dietary supplement use in the European Prospective Investigation into Cancer in Norfolk, Public Health Nutrition 18. pp. 1060–1066.
- 2014 Lentjes, M. A. H., McTaggart, A., Mulligan, A. A., Powell, N. A., Parry-Smith, D., Luben, R. N., Bhaniani, A., Welch, A., Khaw, K. Dietary intake measurement using 7 d diet diaries in British men and women in the European Prospective Investigation into Cancer-Norfolk study, The British Journal of Nutrition 111. pp. 516–526.
- 2014 Welch, A. A. Nutritional influences on age-related skeletal muscle loss, Proceedings of the Nutrition Society 73. pp. 16–33.
- 2014 Welch, A., Macgregor, A., Minihane, A., Skinner, J., Valdes, A. A., Spector, T. D., Cassidy, A. Dietary Fat and Fatty Acid Profile Are Associated with Indices of Skeletal Muscle Mass in Women Aged 18-79 Years, The Journal of Nutrition 144. pp. 327–334.
- 2014 Cassidy, A., Jennings, A., Spector, T. D., Welch, A., Macgregor, A. Intakes of Anthocyanins and Flavones Are Associated with Biomarkers of Insulin Resistance and Inflammation in Women, The Journal of Nutrition 144. pp. 202–208.

== Memberships ==
- Higher Education Academy (Fellow since 2009).
- British Nutrition Society.
- British Dietetic Association.
- Association for the Study of Obesity.
- Association of Nutrition.
- American Society for Nutrition.
- Co-lead of the Metabolic and Endocrine group of the Norfolk and Suffolk Comprehensive Local Research Network.
- National Osteoporosis Society (scientific advisory committee).
- Council of The Nutrition Society.
