= Amanda Howe =

British medical doctor

- Occupation: General Practitioner
- Years active: 17

Amanda Caroline Howe OBE FRCGP FMedSci is a British medical doctor who worked as a general practitioner (GP) and is an Emeritus Professor of Primary Care at the University of East Anglia. She is a former President of the Royal College of General Practitioners (RCGP) 2019—2021 and a former President of the World Organization of Family Doctors (WONCA) 2016—2018.

== Early career ==
She studied at the University of London and Newnham College, Cambridge. Since her graduation in 1984, Howe has worked as a GP. She was a partner at the Foxhill Medical Centre in Sheffield between the years of 1984–2001. She later practised one day a week at the Bowthorpe Medical Centre in Norwich, England.

== Academic medicine ==
In 1992, Howe became a lecturer. In 2001, as Norwich Medical School was being established, Howe became a Professor of Primary Care at the University of East Anglia.

At the RCGP, Howe was Chair of Research from 2000−2005. She was chair of the Society for Academic Primary Care from 2007–2010. She was elected RCGP Honorary Secretary in 2009. She became a vice-chair of RCGP council in 2013 and following this led on professional development, continuing her work as chairwoman of the RCGP workforce committee.

In June 2013, Howe was elected as President-elect of WONCA and in 2016 became the first woman to be President of WONCA. In June 2019, she was elected president of the RCGP, taking over from Mayur Lakhani in November 2019 for a two-year term.

In 2022, she became an Emeritus Professor of Primary Care at the University of East Anglia.

== Awards and honours ==
She is a fellow of the RCGP and the Academy of Medical Sciences. She was awarded the Eric Elder medal in 2014 by the Royal New Zealand College of General Practitioners. She was appointed Officer of the Order of the British Empire (OBE) in the 2016 New Year Honours for services to primary care.
