= The Cross Keys, Beverley =

Pub in Beverley, East Riding of Yorkshire, England

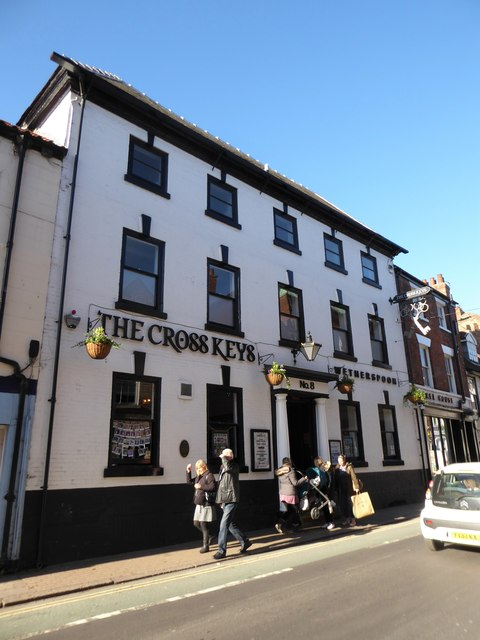
The pub, in 2017

The Cross Keys is a pub in Beverley, a town in the East Riding of Yorkshire, in England.

The building was constructed in the 1760s, with the staircase having been moved from elsewhere, probably the demolished Hotham House. The main doorway was replaced in the 19th century. It was later converted into a pub, taking its name from an earlier Cross Keys inn on another site. The building was grade II* listed in 1950, and is externally one of the least altered buildings of its type in the town. In 2016, the pub was purchased by Wetherspoons, which restored the building and extended the pub into a smaller adjacent building.

The pub is built of painted brick on a plinth, with a moulded eaves cornice, and a slate roof. It has three storeys and is five bays wide. The central doorway has applied Tuscan columns and an entablature. The windows are sashes with flat gauged arches and triple keystones. Inside, the highlight is the staircase from Hotham House.

== See also ==
- Grade II* listed buildings in the East Riding of Yorkshire
- Listed buildings in Beverley (west and southwest areas)
