= Chambranle =

Architectural framing component

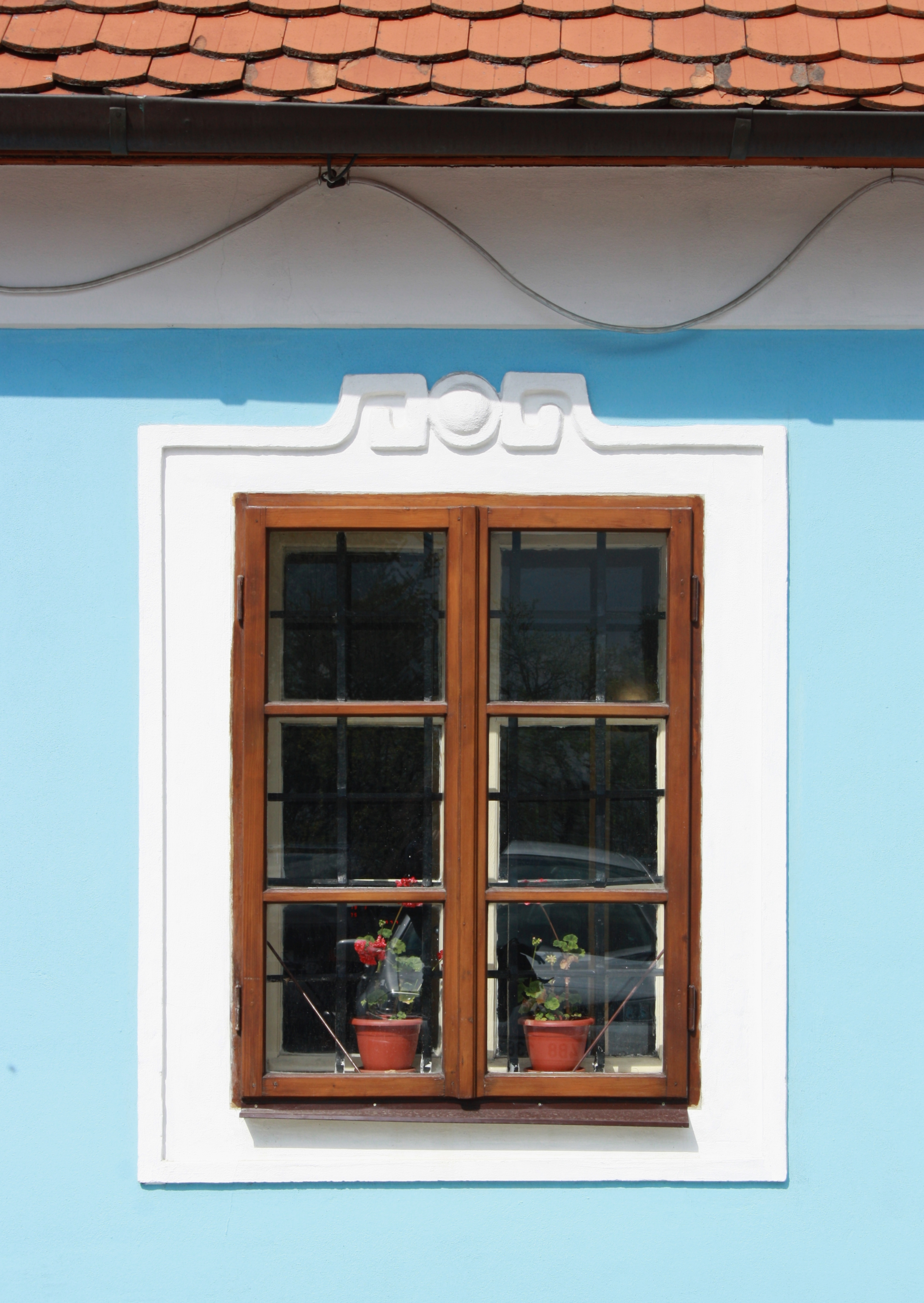
Chambranle (Moravec, Czech Republic)

In architecture and joinery, the chambranle is the border, frame, or ornament, made of stone or wood, that is a component of the three sides round chamber doors, large windows, and chimneys.

When a chambranle is plain and without mouldings, it is called a band, case, or frame. The chambranle consists of three parts; the two sides, called montants, or ports, and the top, called the traverse or supercilium. The chambranle of an ordinary door is frequently called a doorcase; of a window, window frame; and of a chimney, manteltree.

== History ==
In ancient architecture, antepagmenta were garnishings in posts or doors, wrought in stone or timber, or lintels of a window. The word comes from Latin and has been borrowed in English to be used for the entire chambranle, i.e. the door case, or window frame.

== See also ==
- Door frame
- Architrave#Modern architraves
