= Courtney (given name) =

- Gender: Unisex
- Language: English

Origin
- Languages: Norman, French, Irish, English
- Origin: Courtney (surname)
- Region of origin: England, France, Ireland

Other names
- Variant forms: Cortney; Courteney; Cortnee; Courtenay; Kortney; Kourtney; Courtnee; Courtny

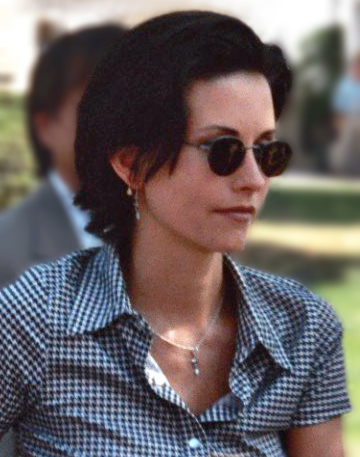
Actress Courteney Cox in 1995

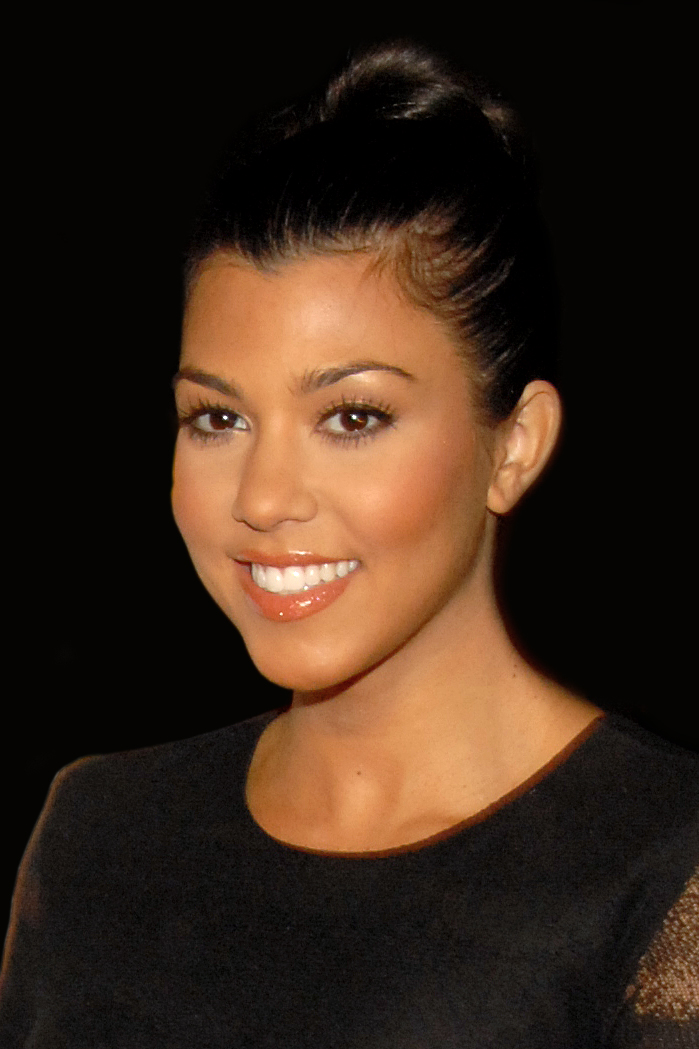
American reality television star Kourtney Kardashian in 2009

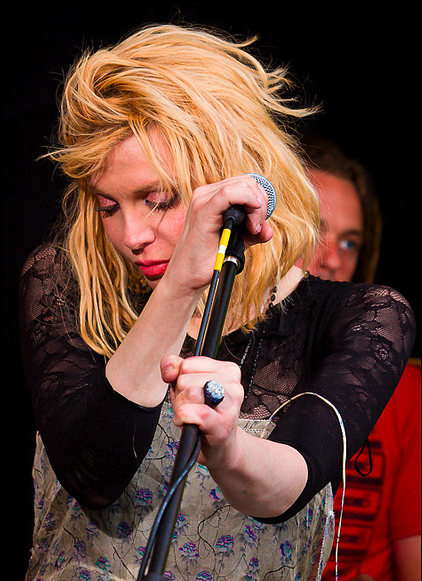
Courtney Love performing a live acoustic session with band Hole for radio 104.5 in Philadelphia, Pennsylvania, 2010

Courtney is a unisex given name that is a transferred use of the Norman French surname and place name Courtenay, meaning "domain of Curtius". Courtenay was used as a given name for men beginning in the 17th century (e.g. the British Member of Parliament Sir Courtenay Pole, 2nd Baronet, 1619–1695). Courtenay has been in use as a given name for women in the Southern United States since the 18th century. American woman Courtenay Tucker (1704–1757) resided in Charles County, Virginia. Female descendants of Tucker were given the name. During the 19th century, most women with the name lived in the Southern United States. As a given name for women it gained increased usage in the years following the 1956 publication of Pamela Moore's novel Chocolates for Breakfast, whose protagonist Courtney Farrell sometimes wishes she had been born a man. American rock musician Courtney Love, born in 1964, was named after the character. It was considered a surname style name for girls. Courtney appeared among the 1,000 most popular names for American girls for the first time in the 1960s. The name was further popularized by Courtney Patterson, a character played by Natalie Wood in the 1973 American television film The Affair. In 1977, a study by psychologist Richard Zweigenhaft found that the name Courtney had an image of intelligence, leadership, and upperclass connotations. The name peaked in the United States in 1990, when it was the 17th most popular name for girls. It experienced a slight bump in popularity in 1995 due to the appearance of actress Courteney Cox on the American television sitcom Friends, but has declined in use and last appeared among the top 1,000 names for American girls in 2017. It was given to only 99 girls in the US in 2024. Spelling variant Kourtney had a slight increase in use in 2010 and 2011 in the United States due to the visibility of American reality television star Kourtney Kardashian. Courtney was also well-used from the latter 20th century and early 21st century in other English speaking countries, including Australia, Canada, Ireland, New Zealand, and the United Kingdom.

Spelling variations include Cortney, Courtenay, Courteney, Cortnee, Courtenay, Kortney and Kourtney.

Notable people and characters with the given name include:

== Female ==
- Courtney Abbot (born 1989), New Zealand actress
- Courtney Act (born 1982), Australian drag queen
- Courtney Adeleye, American founder
- Courtney Marie Andrews (born 1990), American singer-songwriter
- Courtney Babcock (born 1972), Canadian runner
- Courtney Banghart (born 1978), American basketball coach
- Courtney Bangs, American politician
- Courtney Barnett (born 1987), Australian singer-songwriter and guitarist
- Courtney Blades (born 1978), American softball player
- Courtney Bowman (born 1995), English actress
- Courtney Angela Brkic (born 1972), American memoirist
- Courtney Brosnan (born 1995), American-Irish footballer
- Courtney Bruce (born 1993), Australian netball player
- Courtney Bryan (composer), American composer
- Courtney Burke (born 1994), American ice hockey defenseman
- Cortney Casey (born 1987), American mixed martial artist
- Courtney Clarkson (born 1991), Australian rules footballer
- Courtney Clements (born 1989), American basketball player
- Courtney Coleman (born 1981), American basketball player
- Courtney Conlogue (born 1992), American surfer
- Courteney Cox (born 1964), American actress, best known for playing Monica Geller in Friends
- Courtney Cox Cole (1971–2019), American athlete
- Courtney Cox (musician) (born 1989), American guitarist
- Courtney Cramey (born 1985), Australian rules footballer
- Courtney Rachel Culkin (born 1983), American model
- Courtney Dauwalter (born 1985), American runner
- Courtney Deifel (born 1980), American softball coach
- Courtney Dike (born 1995), Nigerian footballer
- Courtney Duever (born 1991), American basketball player
- Courtney Duncan (motorcyclist) (born 1996), New Zealand motorcycle racer
- Courtney Eaton (born 1996), Australian actress and model
- Courtney Ekmark (born 1995), American basketball player
- Courtney Simmons Elwood (born 1968), American attorney
- Courtney Enders (born 1986), American auto racer
- Courtney Field (born 1997), Australian track cyclist
- Courtney Fink, American art curator
- Courtney Force (born 1988), American auto racer
- Courtney Ford (born 1978), American actress
- Courtney Fortune, American singer-songwriter
- Courtney Frerichs (born 1993), American middle-distance runner
- Courtney Friel (born 1980), American television presenter
- Courtney Fukuda, American businessperson
- Courtney Garrett (born 1992), American beauty pageant titleholder
- Courtney George (born 1986), American curler
- Courtney Gibbs (born 1966), American actress
- Courtney Guard (born 1991), Australian rules footballer
- Courtney Gum (born 1981), Australian rules footballer
- Courtney Hadwin (born 2004), English singer-songwriter
- Courtney Hansen (born 1974), American television host
- Courtney Halverson (born 1989), American actress
- Courtney Hazlett (born 1976), American columnist
- Courtney Henggeler (born 1978), American retired actress
- Courtney Hicks (born 1995), American figure skater
- Courtney Hill (born 1987), Australian cricket player
- Courtney Houssos, Australian politician
- Courtney Rae Hudson (born 1973), American justice
- Courtney Hunt (born 1964), American director
- Courtney Hurley (born 1990), American fencer
- Courtney Jaye (born 1978), American singer-songwriter
- Courtney Jenaé, Los Angeles-based singer-songwriter
- Courtney Jines (born 1992), American actress
- Courtney Johnson (water polo) (born 1974), American water polo player
- Courtney Johnston, New Zealand chief executive
- Courtney Jolly (born 1986), American race car driver
- Courtney Dunbar Jones, American judge
- Courtney Jones (soccer) (born 1990), American soccer player
- Cortney Jordan (born 1991), American swimmer
- Kourtney Kardashian (born 1979), American media personality
- Kourtney Keegan (born 1994), American tennis player
- Courtney A. Kemp (born 1977), American television writer
- Courtney Jane Kendrick (born 1977), American blogger
- Courtney Kennedy (born 1979), American ice hockey player
- Courtney Kessel (born 1989), Canadian ice hockey player
- Courtney King-Dye (born 1977), American equestrian
- Kourtney Klein, American vocalist
- Courtney Knight, Canadian Paralympics athlete
- Courtney Kupets (born 1986), American gymnast
- Kourtney Kunichika (born 1991), American ice hockey forward
- Courtney M. Leonard (born 1980), American artist and filmmaker
- Cortney Lollar, English professor
- Courtney Love (born 1964), American rock musician and actress
- Courteney Lowe (born 1991), New Zealand professional racing cyclist
- Courtney MacIntosh (born 1983), Canadian rower
- Cortney Mansour (born 1994), Canadian-Czech ice dancer
- Courtney Marsh (born 1986), American film director
- Courtney E. Martin (born 1979), American author
- Courtney Mathewson (born 1986), American water polo player
- Courtney McCool (born 1988), American gymnast
- Courtney McGregor (born 1998), New Zealand gymnast
- Courtney Meldrum (born 1977), American long-distance runner
- Courtney Sina Meredith (born 1986), New Zealand poet
- Courtney Milan (born 1976), American author
- Courtney A. Miller, American neuroscientist
- Kourtnee Monroe, American model
- Courtney Allison Moulton (born 1986), American author
- Courteney Munn (born 1998), Australian rules footballer
- Courtney Boyd Myers (born 1984), American journalist
- Courtney Nagle (born 1982), American professional tennis player
- Courtney Neron Misslin (born 1979), American politician
- Courtney Nevin (born 2002), Australian footballer
- Courtney Niemiec (born 1992), American soccer player
- Courtney Okolo (born 1994), American athletics competitor
- Kortney Olson (born 1981), American-born bodybuilder and athlete
- Cortney Palm (born 1987), American actress
- Courtney Paris (born 1987), American basketball player
- Courtney Parker (born 1985), American singer living in Greece
- Courtney Peldon (born 1981), American television and film actress
- Courtney C. Radsch (born 1979), American journalist
- Courtney Raetzman (born 1994), American soccer player
- Courtney Reed (born 1985), American actress
- Courtney Rush (born 1983), Canadian professional wrestler
- Courtney Ryan (born 1990), American basketball player
- Courtney Sarault (born 2000), Canadian short track speed skater
- Courtney Schulhoff (born 1987), American prisoner
- Courtney Shealy (born 1977), American swimmer
- Courtney Sheinmel (born 1977), American author
- Courtney Simon (born 1946), American writer
- Courtney Sixx (born 1985), American model
- Courtney Stodden (born 1994), American television personality
- Courtney Summers (born 1986), Canadian writer
- Courtney Sweetman-Kirk (born 1990), English footballer
- Courtney Tairi (born 1988), New Zealand netball player
- Courtney Thomas (born 1988), American beauty pageant titleholder
- Courtney Thompson (born 1984), American volleyball player
- Courtney Thorne-Smith (born 1967), American actress
- Courtney Thorpe (born 1990), Australian beauty pageant titleholder
- Cortney Tidwell (born 1972), American singer-songwriter
- Courtney Turner (born 1994), American ice hockey player
- Courtney Vandersloot (born 1989), American basketball player
- Courtney Verloo (born 1991), American soccer player
- Cortnee Vine (born 1998), Australian soccer player
- Courtney Wakefield (born 1987), Australian rules footballer
- Courtney Watson (politician) (born 1962), Democratic politician
- Courtney Webb (sportswoman) (born 1999), Australian rules footballer
- Courtney Wetzel (born 1989), American soccer player
- Courtney Williams (born 1994), American basketball player
- Kortney Wilson (born c. 1979), Canadian country music singer
- Courtney Young (librarian), American librarian
- Courtney Yamada-Anderson (born 1980), American skeleton racer
- Courtney Zablocki (born 1981), American luger

== Male ==
- Courtney Alexander (born 1977), American basketball player
- Courtney Anderson (born 1980), American football player
- Courtney B. Vance (born 1960), American actor
- Courtney Blackman, Barbadian economist, business consultant and diplomat
- Cortney Lance Bledsoe (born 1976), American writer
- Edward Courtney Boyle (1883–1967), English recipient of the Victoria Cross
- Courtney Brown (defensive end) (born 1978), American football player
- Courtney Brown (social scientist), American social scientist and proponent of remote viewing
- Kourtnei Brown (born 1988), American football outside linebacker
- Courtney Browne (born 1970), West Indian cricketer
- Kortney Clemons (born 1980), American athlete
- Charles Courtney Curran (1861–1942), American Impressionist painter
- William Courtney Dowling (born 1944), American author and social critic
- Courtney Freckleton (born 1990) Nines (rapper)
- Courtney Gains (born 1965), American actor
- Lawrence Courtney Haines (known as Courtney) (c. 1920 – 1996), Australian ornithologist
- Courtney Hall (1968–2021), American football player
- Kortney Hause (born 1995), English footballer
- Courtney Hodges (1887–1966), United States Army general
- Courtney Jackson (born 2001), American football player
- Courtney Kruger (born 1988), South African-born batsman who has played two One Day Internationals for Hong Kong
- Courtney Lawes (born 1989), English rugby union player
- Courtney Lee (born 1985), American basketball player
- Courtney Lewis (born 1984), British conductor
- Courtney John Lock (born 1996), Zimbabwean tennis player
- Courtney McNish, Trinidad and Tobago politician
- Courtney Meppen-Walters (1994–2026), English footballer
- Courtney Murphy (singer) (born 1979), contestant in the 2004 season of the Australian reality television series Australian Idol
- John Courtney Murray (1904–1967), American Jesuit theologian
- Courtney Pine (born 1964), British jazz musician
- Courtney Pitt (born 1981), English footballer
- Courtney Roby (born 1983), American football player
- Courtney Senior (born 1997), English footballer
- Courtney Solomon (born 1971), Canadian film director
- Courtney Taylor-Taylor (born 1967), American songwriter, singer and guitarist
- Courtney Walsh (born 1962), West Indian cricketer
- Courtney Watson (American football) (born 1980), American football player
- Courtney Whitney (1897–1969), American lawyer and Army commander
- Kortney Ryan Ziegler (born 1980), American filmmaker

== Fictional characters ==
- Courtney Chetwynde, from D.J. MacHale's Pendragon series
- Courtney Crimsen, a character in the novel and Netflix TV series 13 Reasons Why
- Courtney Crumrin, character in a comic book series written and illustrated by Ted Naifeh and released through Oni Press
- Courtney Farrell, protagonist of the 1956 best-seller Chocolates for Breakfast by Pamela Moore
- Courtney Gripling, character in the Nickelodeon animated series As Told By Ginger
- Courtney Haine, a.k.a. Sergeant Hatred, a character in the adult animated series The Venture Bros.
- Courtney Heironimus, mobile suit pilot from the Gundam franchise
- Courtney Krieger, a.k.a. Cover Girl, a character in the G.I. Joe franchise
- Courtney Matthews, heroine on the ABC soap opera General Hospital
- Courtney Mitchell, a character in the British soap opera EastEnders
- Courtney Ross, a.k.a. Saturnyne, a character from Marvel Comics
- Courtney Whitmore, a.k.a. Stargirl, from DC Comics
- Courtney Lane, a character from the 2009 musical television film Spectacular!
- Courtney, a character from the Canadian animated series Total Drama
- Courtney, a character in the series The Fairly OddParents: Fairly Odder
- Courtney Shayne, antagonist in the film Jawbreaker
- Courtney Moore, American Girl character
- Courtney, a character in the game Pokemon Omega Ruby and Pokémon Ruby
- Courtney, a.k.a. Invisigal, a character in the game Dispatch

== See also ==
- Courtney (disambiguation)
- Courtney (surname)
- Courtenay (disambiguation)
