= Stour Row =

Village in Dorset, England

Coordinates: 50.9895°N 2.2546°W

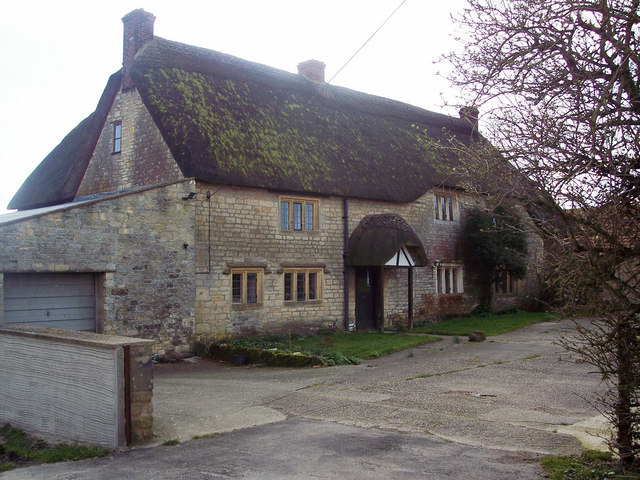
- Sweet's House, Stour Row

- Location within Dorset
- OS grid reference: ST822211
- Unitary authority: Dorset
- Ceremonial county: Dorset
- Region: South West
- Country: England
- Sovereign state: United Kingdom
- Police: Dorset
- Fire: Dorset and Wiltshire
- Ambulance: South Western

Stour Row is a village in north Dorset, England, situated beside Duncliffe Hill three miles (five kilometres) southwest of Shaftesbury. It lies within the parish of the neighbouring village of Stour Provost. Stour Row has approximately 150 houses and 300 residents. It has a village hall, which is used for social events. Today it has few other amenities, but it had a petrol station, pub and shop prior to the early 1980s. It has a church, All Saints, which was built in 1867 but which has now closed due to falling congregation numbers. The last service was held in the church on 15 October 2015. Stour Row lies within the SP7 postcode area on the edge of the Blackmore Vale.

== History ==
Stour Row developed as a small hamlet along the Shaftesbury to Marnhull road, some 3 1/4 miles (5.2 kilometres) west of Shaftesbury. Originally, known as Stower Row, it was part of the manor of Stour Provost which itself is mentioned in the Domesday Book simply as ‘Stur’.

The manor and lands of Stower had been granted to Eton College by Henry VI but the manor was later granted to the Provost, Fellows and Scholars of King's College, Cambridge, by Edward IV. King's College retained possession of much of the land until they sold it in 1925, at which point many farmers and cottagers were able to buy their property as sitting tenants.

Ownership of the 213-acre (86-hectare) Duncliffe Wood rested with the Forestry Commission by 1980, who in turn put it up for sale for £120,000 in 1984. The Woodland Trust launched a campaign to raise funds through a public appeal and the purchase was completed that year.

Many of the houses in Stour Row were built alongside the main routes through the village in a typical "Dorset strip" fashion with long thin gardens running alongside the road. Most date from the eighteenth and nineteenth centuries. Some of the farms appear to date back far further and many take their names from former owners.

Formerly the village had a pub, The College Arms. It is not certain when the dwelling which housed it became an inn but it may have been around 1829 when Edward Painter, a 'Common Brewer', bought the house. The property was bought by the brewers Hall and Woodhouse in 1963, but they sold it on to the licensee Robert Martin on condition that it ceased to sell alcohol, and the pub closed.

== Village Hall ==
Stour Row village hall is a converted Congregationalist chapel built in 1847 and bought by the village for £105/1s/6d in 1949. Among the necessary alterations a kitchen extension was built at the cost of £361/17s/3d. During 2013 the Hall underwent restructuring, redecoration and modernising as a result of the contributions of local residents in time and finance.

== Notable residents ==
- Gwendoline Courtney (1911-1996), children's writer
