= Courtney (surname) =

Surname list

Courtney is an English surname originating from England, France and Ireland, where it was of Norman origin.

== List of people with the surname ==
- Alexander Courtney, English historian and teacher
- Barns Courtney (born 1990), English musician
- Brendan Courtney (born 1971), Irish television presenter
- Charles E. Courtney (1849–1920), American rower and rowing coach
- C. F. Courtney (died 1941), manager of Australian mining and ore treatment company
- Christopher Courtney (1890–1976), British Royal Air Force officer
- Clint Courtney (1927–1975), American baseball player
- Dave Courtney (born 1959), British author and self-proclaimed ex-gangster
- Diane Courtney (born 1920 or 1921), American singer
- Duane Courtney (born 1985), English footballer
- Eamon Courtenay (born 1960), Belizean politician
- Ernie Courtney (1875–1920), American baseball player
- Gwendoline Courtney (1911–1996), British children's writer
- Henry A. Courtney Jr. (1916–1945), US Marine Corps Reserve officer during World War II and Medal of Honor recipient
- Jack Courtney (disambiguation), multiple people
- Jacqueline Courtney (1946–2010), American actor
- Jai Courtney (born 1986), Australian actor
- James Courtney (born 1980), Australian racing driver
- Janet E. Courtney (1865–1954), British scholar, writer and feminist
- Joe Courtney (disambiguation), multiple people
- Joel Courtney (born 1996), American film actor
- John Courtney (disambiguation), multiple people
- Jon Courtney (1918–1997), British musician
- Leonard Courtney, 1st Baron Courtney of Penwith (1832–1918), British politician and man of letters
- Lou Courtney (1943–2021), American musician
- Mel Courtney, New Zealand Independent politician; great-nephew of James Courtney of New Zealand
- Nicholas Courtney (1929–2011), British television actor
- Pip Courtney, Australian journalist and television presenter
- Robert Courtney (born 1952), American pharmacist convicted of fraud
- Roger Courtney, British military officer influential in the establishment of the Special Boat Service
- Samuel E. Courtney (1865–1941) American physician, politician, and teacher
- Stephanie Courtney (born 1970), American actor and comedian
- Steven Courtney (born 1955), British scientist
- Tom Courtney (1933–2023), former American athlete
- Vernon Harrison Courtenay (1932–2009), Belizean politician
- William Harrison Courtney (born 1944), American diplomat
- William Leonard Courtney (1850–1928), English author
- William Prideaux Courtney (1845–1913), British biographer and civil servant

== See also ==
- Courtney (disambiguation)
- Courtney (given name)
- House of Courtenay
- McCourt
- McCartney
