= Courtenay =

Courtenay may refer to:

== Places ==
=== Australia ===
- Courtenay, Western Australia

=== Canada ===
- Courtenay, British Columbia, a city on the east coast of Vancouver Island
- Courtenay River, on Vancouver Island, British Columbia
- Courtenay Lake, a lake in north-eastern Saskatchewan

=== France ===
- Courtenay, Isère, a commune in the Isère département
- Courtenay, Loiret, a commune in the Loiret département

=== New Zealand ===
- Courtenay, New Zealand, a locality in the Selwyn District
- Courtenay (New Zealand electorate), a former electorate in Canterbury, based on the locality of the same name
- Courtenay River, the short-lived European name of the Waimakariri River

=== United Kingdom ===
- Nuneham Courtenay, Oxfordshire
- Sampford Courtenay, Devon
- Sutton Courtenay, Oxfordshire

=== United States ===
- Courtenay, North Dakota, a city in Stutsman County
- Courtenay, Florida, an unincorporated community in Brevard County

== People ==
=== Given name ===
Courtenay is a given name variant of Courtney. Notable people with the name include:

==== Male ====
- Courtenay Bartholomew (born 1931), Irish physician and scientist
- Courtenay Bennett (1855–1937), British diplomat
- Courtenay Boyle (1770–1844), British Royal Navy officer
- Courtenay Crocker (1881–1944), American attorney and politician
- Courtenay Daley (born 1950), Jamaican cricketer
- Courtenay Dempsey (born 1987), Australian rules footballer
- Courtenay Hughes Fenn (1866–1927), American missionary
- Courtenay Foote (1878–1925), English actor
- Courtenay Griffiths, British lawyer
- Courtenay Adrian Ilbert (1888–1956), English civil engineer and horologist
- Courtenay Ilbert (1841–1924), British lawyer
- Courtenay Knollys (1849-1905), British rower
- Courtenay Mansel (1880–1933), Welsh farmer
- Courtenay Morgan, 1st Viscount Tredegar (1867–1934), British military personnel
- Courtenay Reece (1899–1984), West Indian cricket umpire
- Courtenay Selman (born 1945), Barbadian cricketer
- Courtenay Edward Stevens (1905-1976), British classicist
- Courtenay Warner (1857–1934), British politician

==== Female ====
- Courtenay Becker-Dey (born 1965), American sailor
- Courtenay Finn, American curator
- Courtenay Stewart (born 1985), Canadian synchronized swimmer
- Courtenay Taylor (born 1969), American voice actress

=== Surname ===
- Vernon Harrison Courtenay (1932–2009), Belizean politician
- Eamon Courtenay (born 1960), Belizean politician (son of Vernon)
- William Courtenay (disambiguation)

== See also ==
- Courtenay Place (disambiguation)
- House of Courtenay
- Courtney (disambiguation)
