= George Courtenay =

George Courtenay may refer to:

- George Courtenay (politician) (1666–1725), English MP
- George Courtenay (actor), actor in the 1913 film Ivanhoe
- Sir George Courtenay, 1st Baronet (c. 1583–1644), Irish landowner and soldier

== See also ==
- George Courtney (born 1941), English football referee
- Courtenay (surname)
