= Margaret Courtenay =

Margaret Courtenay may refer to:

- Margaret Courtenay, Marchioness of Namur, Countess of Vianden (d. 1270)
- Margaret Courtenay, Baroness Herbert (d. before 1526)
- Margaret Courtenay (actress), British actress (1923-1996)

== See also ==
- Margaret (disambiguation)
- Courtenay (disambiguation)
