= East Stour, Dorset =

Village and civil parish in Dorset, England

Coordinates: 51.0053°N 2.2874°W

East Stour
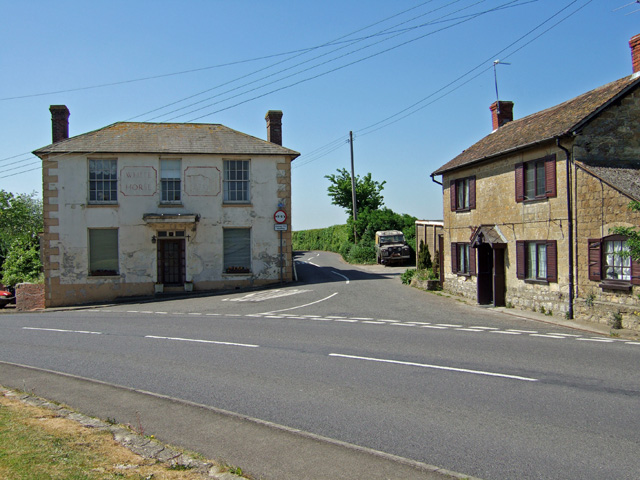
- East Stour

- Location within Dorset
- Population: 573
- OS grid reference: ST 7993 2292
- Unitary authority: Dorset
- Ceremonial county: Dorset
- Region: South West
- Country: England
- Sovereign state: United Kingdom
- Post town: GILLINGHAM
- Postcode district: SP8
- Dialling code: 01747
- Police: Dorset
- Fire: Dorset and Wiltshire
- Ambulance: South Western
- UK Parliament: North Dorset

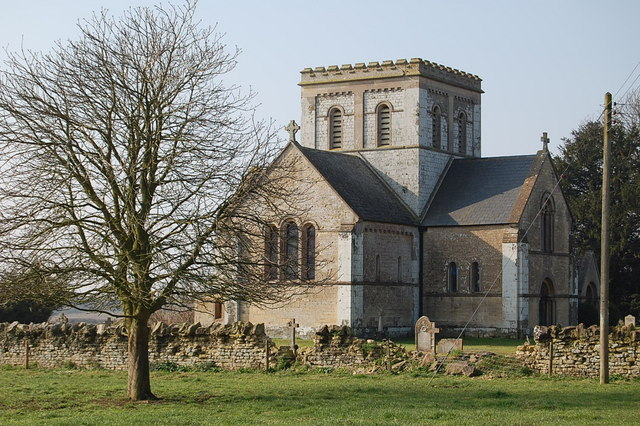
East Stour parish church

East Stour is a village and civil parish in the ceremonial county of Dorset in southern England. It lies within the Dorset administrative district, about two miles (three kilometres) south of the town of Gillingham. The village is 1/2 mile (800 metres) from the east bank of the River Stour in the Blackmore Vale and two miles (three kilometres) west of the broadly conical local landmark Duncliffe Hill (with a summit elevation of 210 metres or 690 feet). Above the west bank of the river, about one mile (1.5 kilometres) away, is the village of West Stour. The A30 London to Penzance road passes through the village. In the 2011 census the civil parish had a population of 573.

== History ==
Part of the shaft of a cross, probably dating from the late 10th or early 11th century, was found in 1939 when a house in the village was demolished. The stone fragment has a cross-section a little under 30 centimetres (12 inches) square and is about 70 cm (27 1/2 in) high; its faces are embellished with vine-scroll, interlace and palmette ornament. It was transferred to the British Museum.

In the Domesday Book of 1086 East Stour and West Stour together were recorded as Stur or Sture, which had 73 households and administratively was in Gillingham Hundred. A 1695 map shows the village name as Stower Estover.

East Stour village was the original settlement in the parish, with study of field boundaries suggesting that encroachment on the "waste" or common land subsequently occurred eastwards, initially immediately east of the village, then further east in post-medieval times. The farms at New House and Cole Street in the northeast of the parish date from settlement in the late 18th century, and in the southeast the waste was enclosed in 1804.

The parish church was rebuilt in 1841–42 near the site of its predecessor, from which the Norman stone font was retrieved.

== Governance ==
East Stour is in the electoral ward called The Stours, which extends southeast as far as East Orchard and in the 2011 census had a population of 1,786. The ward is part of the constituency of North Dorset, and is currently represented in the UK parliament by the Conservative Simon Hoare.

In local government East Stour is governed by Dorset Council, which is a unitary authority. At the parish level East Stour is one of four parishes—the others being Todber, Stour Provost and West Stour—under the governance of The Stours Parish Council, which is a grouped parish council.

== Geography ==
The underlying geology of the parish is Corallian Limestone in the west and Kimmeridge clay in the east, with gault clay around the greensand of Duncliffe Hill. The village is on the limestone.

== Demography ==
In the 2011 census East Stour civil parish had 267 dwellings, 251 households and a population of 573. 26.2% of residents were age 65 or over, compared to 16.4% for England as a whole.

== Amenities ==
East Stour has a village hall and two public houses: The Crown Inn on the B3092 towards Gillingham and The Kings Arms at East Stour Common.

== Notable residents ==
The writer and magistrate Henry Fielding (1707–1754), who also founded the Bow Street Runners, lived in the manor house for three years, after inheriting it. During this time he spent his fortune and consequently became a professional writer. The house, sited west of the church, was demolished in 1835, though its mullioned windows were probably incorporated into its replacement, which previously was called Fielding's Farm but in 1919 became Church Farm.
