= Platform economy =

Economic and social activity facilitated by technological platforms

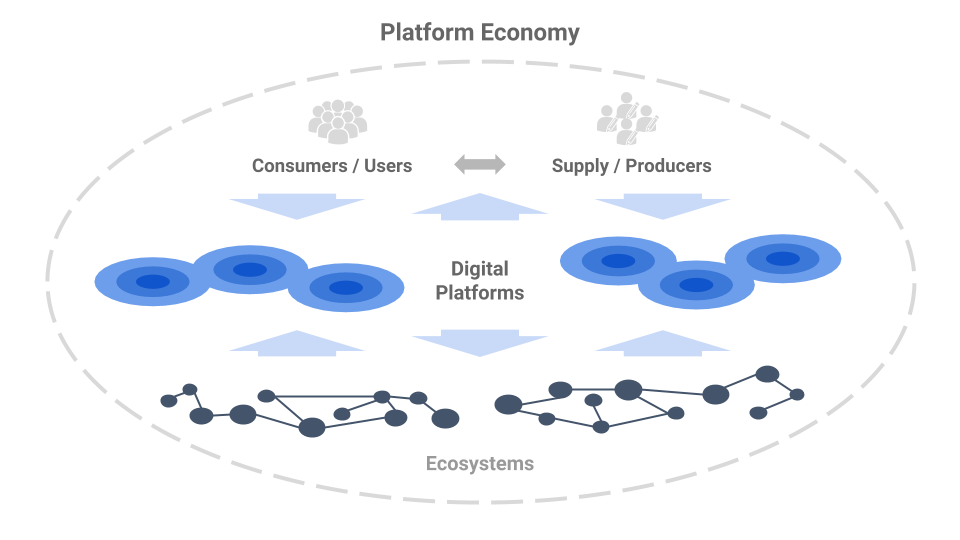
Platform economy visualization

The platform economy encompasses economic and social activities facilitated by digital platforms. These platforms — such as Amazon, Airbnb, Uber, Microsoft and Google — serve as intermediaries between various groups of users, enabling interactions, transactions, collaboration, and innovation. The platform economy has experienced rapid growth, disrupting traditional business models and contributing significantly to the global economy.

Platform businesses are characterized by their reliance on network effects, where the platform's value increases as more users join. This has allowed many platform companies to scale quickly and achieve global influence. Platform economies have also introduced novel challenges, such as the rise of precarious work arrangements in the gig economy, reduced labor protections, and concerns about tax evasion by platform operators. In addition, critics argue that platforms contribute to market concentration and increase inequality.

Historically, platforms have roots in pre-digital economic systems, with examples of matchmaking and exchange-based systems dating back millennia. However, the rise of the internet in the 1990s enabled the rapid expansion of online platforms, starting with pioneers like Craigslist and eBay. Since the 2008 financial crisis, the platform economy has further expanded with the growth of sharing economy services like Airbnb and labor market platforms such as TaskRabbit. The increasing prominence of platforms has attracted attention from scholars, governments, and regulators, with many early assessments praising their potential to enhance productivity and create new markets.

In recent years, concerns about the social and economic impacts of the platform economy have grown. Critics have highlighted issues such as technological unemployment, the displacement of traditional jobs with precarious forms of labor, and declining tax revenues. Some scholars and policymakers have also raised alarms about the potential psychological effects of excessive platform use and its impact on social cohesion. As a result, there has been a shift towards more regulatory scrutiny of platforms, particularly in the European Union, where new regulations have been proposed to ensure fair competition and worker protections. Despite these challenges, platforms continue to be a dominant force in the global economy, with ongoing debates about how best to manage their influence.

== History ==
The concept of platforms facilitating economic and social exchanges predates the digital era by centuries. Early examples include matchmaking services in China dating back to at least 1100 BC, where intermediaries connected potential marriage partners. Similarly, ancient grain exchanges in Greece and medieval fairs have been compared to modern transactional platforms. Over time, geographic areas known for specific types of production, like certain industrial clusters, have also functioned as innovation platforms, a concept that was further formalized in the 1980s with the emergence of technology platforms such as Wintel.

The rise of the internet transformed platform-based businesses by dramatically improving connectivity and communication. Online platforms such as Craigslist and eBay emerged in the 1990s, while later social media platforms like Myspace and collaborative platforms like Wikipedia followed in the early 2000s. The 2008 financial crisis spurred the creation of new platform models, including asset-sharing platforms such as Airbnb and labor platforms such as TaskRabbit.

Despite the long history of platform-like systems, it wasn’t until the 1990s that scholars began to focus on platforms as a distinct business model. Early research primarily examined innovation platforms without special emphasis on digital platforms. By the late 1990s, understanding of the broader "platform economy" remained limited. The term "platform" has since expanded to include digital matchmakers and multi-sided markets, as described by Jean-Charles Rochet and Jean Tirole in their seminal work on platform competition.

In an academic context, "platform" often refers to systems that facilitate interactions between different groups, such as Uber, Airbnb, or TaskRabbit. However, platforms can also encompass non-digital matchmakers, such as business parks and nightclubs, or other entities that enable interactions beyond simple transactions. Scholars like Carliss Y. Baldwin and C. Jason Woodard define a platform as a system with stable core components and more variable peripheral components, enabling flexibility and innovation.

The development and impact of platforms continue to evolve, with ongoing academic and business discussions exploring their long-term implications and the ways they reshape markets, industries, and societal practices.

== Platformization ==
Platformization is the increasing prevalence of large digital platforms that act as intermediaries between users, facilitating economic and social interactions in the public sphere. The term was first introduced by Anne Helmond, who described it as "the rise of the platform as the dominant computational, infrastructural, and economic model of the web" and examined how platforms extend their boundaries into new areas of the internet. This process includes the extension of platform infrastructure into diverse domains, encapsulating new areas of economic and social activity.

Helmond's work has been built upon by other scholars, such as Nieborg and Poell, who describe platformization as the expansion of economic and infrastructural extensions of platforms into the web. These extensions affect how cultural content is produced, distributed, and consumed. Platformization often involves the use of application programming interfaces (APIs) and software development kits (SDKs), which allow third-party developers to integrate with platforms, decentralizing data collection while centralizing data processing.

Some scholars have compared the role of digital platforms to traditional infrastructure, such as railroads and utilities. Plantin, Lagoze, and Edwards argue that platforms now function as essential infrastructure, similar to the monopolies of the late 19th and early 20th centuries.

Business studies scholars have emphasized the network effects associated with platform corporations, where the value of a platform increases as more users participate. Critics, however, have raised concerns about how platformization can lead to the concentration of capital and wealth among a small number of business owners. For example, Trebor Scholz has argued that labor exploitation is a systemic feature of crowdsourced platforms such as Amazon's Mechanical Turk.

In the 2010s, the concept of platformization evolved from describing platforms as static entities to viewing them as part of a larger process of digital transformation. Helmond highlighted how platforms use APIs and SDKs to integrate third-party data into their operations, facilitating the decentralization of data collection and the centralization of data processing. Critics such as Poell and Nieborg have argued that this process reshapes cultural practices and influences governance, markets, and data infrastructures.

Simplified definitions of platformization exist, with one common interpretation being the creation of a marketplace that charges users for access. However, more nuanced definitions, like those of Poell and Nieborg, emphasize the broader institutional dimensions of platformization, including data infrastructures, markets, and governance.

== Business model ==
The platform business model involves generating profits by facilitating interactions between two or more distinct groups of users. This model predates the internet; for example, newspapers with classified ads sections have long employed a similar approach. With the advent of digital technology, the platform model has been increasingly adopted, but success is not guaranteed. While some digital-native firms have quickly reached multibillion-dollar valuations and gained strong brand loyalty, many platform startups fail.

Companies that focus on the platform model range from "born-social" startups to traditional businesses that incorporate platform strategies into their operations. Other firms may rely on third-party platforms rather than managing their own. A 2016 survey by Accenture found that 81% of executives expected platform-based models to be central to their growth strategies within three years. Research by McKinsey & Company in 2019 showed that firms using platforms, either their own or third-party, achieved on average a 1.4% higher annual EBIT growth than those without a platform strategy.

Platform operations differ significantly from traditional business models, where the primary focus is on selling goods or services. In contrast, transaction platforms primarily connect different user groups. For example, a conventional taxi company sells transportation services, whereas a platform company connects drivers with passengers.

A notable feature of platform businesses is their reliance on network effects, where the platform's value increases as more people use it. This often results in providing free services to one group of users to attract a larger audience, which then generates demand for the revenue-generating side, such as advertisers.

The shift toward platforms has posed challenges for some established businesses. For instance, companies like BlackBerry Limited and Nokia lost market share to platform-oriented firms like Apple and Google's Android in the early 2010s, as they failed to adapt to the growing importance of ecosystems over products.

== Platforms ==
The creation and functioning of platforms involve technical development, network effects, and, in many cases, the cultivation of ecosystems. These platforms, which facilitate interactions between two or more groups of users, can be categorized into several types based on their main utility.

=== Platform creation ===
The process of creating a platform includes developing technical functionality and fostering network effects. For many platforms, building a robust ecosystem of third-party contributors is also essential.

==== Technical functionality ====
Developing core technical functionality can be relatively inexpensive. For example, Courtney Boyd Myers suggested that a platform like Twitter could be built with minimal costs. However, a platform aiming to attract a substantial user base must be developed to at least the level of a minimum viable product (MVP), which includes a well-polished user experience layer. Boyd Myers reported estimates ranging from $50,000 to $250,000 for developing an MVP like Twitter, while more complex platforms, such as Uber, could cost between $1 and $1.5 million. While building technical functionality is often manageable, attracting a large user base for network effects can be more challenging.

==== Network effects ====
Platforms benefit significantly from network effects, which increase the platform's value as more users join. However, the value of these effects can sometimes be overstated, as seen in the "grab all the eyeballs fallacy," where attracting users does not always lead to successful monetization.

==== Ecosystems ====
Digital platforms often cultivate ecosystems of independent contributors who add value beyond basic platform use. For instance, app developers create third-party applications for platforms like Facebook. Traditional companies entering platform markets may already have an established ecosystem of partners, while startups often expose their platforms via publicly accessible APIs or offer incentives to attract partners. Platform owners usually promote their ecosystems, although competition between the platform owner and participants can occasionally arise.

=== Types of platforms ===
Platforms are often categorized based on the primary utility they provide. The four common types of platforms are transaction, innovation, integrated, and investment platforms.

==== Investment platforms ====
Investment platforms act as holding vehicles for multiple platform businesses or invest in platform companies without operating a major platform themselves.

==== Platform cooperativism ====
Platform cooperativism involves platforms owned and run by the participants, often in contrast to privately owned platforms. These cooperatives may compete with traditional platforms or offer new models for user engagement in sectors like local governance.

== Global distribution, international development, and geostrategy ==
Platforms are often analyzed based on their distribution and varying impacts across different geographic regions. Early discussions speculated that the rise of the platform economy could help the United States maintain its global dominance. While the largest platform companies by market capitalization remain US-based, platforms in Asia, especially India and China, have been growing rapidly. Some commentators have predicted that the platform economy will contribute to a shift of economic power toward Asia.

=== Africa ===
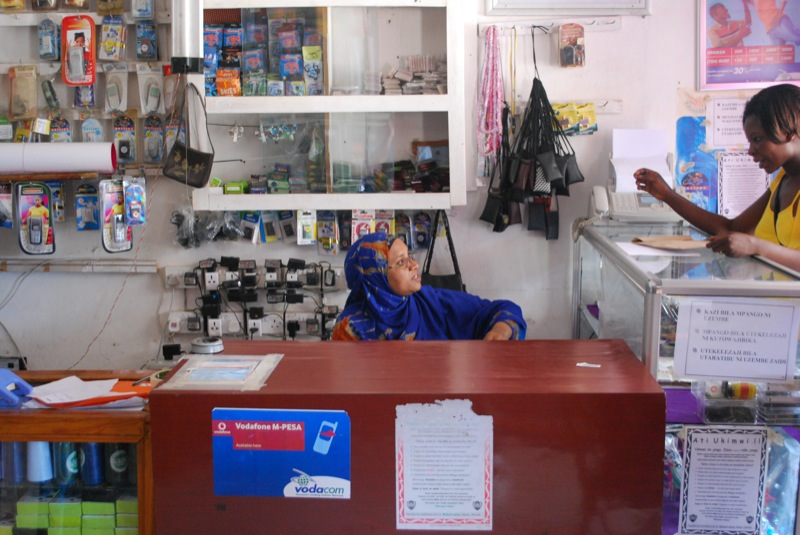
An M-Pesa agent in Tanzania. M-Pesa provides a form of financial inclusion for people without bank accounts.

Several successful platforms have emerged in Africa, many of which are homegrown. Africa has been credited with "leapfrogging" fixed-line internet and developing mobile apps directly. In the field of mobile money, Kenya's M-Pesa brought global attention to the technology. M-Pesa has expanded beyond Africa to Asia and Eastern Europe, allowing users to send and receive money via SMS. Other platforms, such as Ushahidi, have also had significant social impacts in Africa. While platforms in Africa often utilize SMS, the uptake of smartphones has increased, with mobile internet adoption outpacing global averages.

The rise of platforms has brought both opportunities and challenges to Africa. While there has been less disruption to legacy industries due to the relatively undeveloped economic infrastructure, some businesses have still struggled to adapt. By 2017, some of the enthusiasm surrounding Africa’s platform economy had cooled due to declining commodity prices, but optimism remained. A global survey identified only one African platform company valued over $1 billion: Naspers, based in Cape Town.

=== Asia ===
Asia is home to some of the world's largest platform companies. By 2016, Asia had 82 platform companies valued at over $930 billion, with most of these based in China. China's platform economy is dominated by homegrown companies like Alibaba and Tencent, while foreign platforms like eBay have struggled to gain market share.

Outside China, Asian platforms have seen rapid growth in sectors like e-commerce. However, the region has had less success in social media and search until the rise of platforms like TikTok. In some countries, Western platforms remain dominant, such as Facebook in India, where it has become the most popular social media platform.

=== Europe ===
Europe has a significant number of platform companies, though few are valued over $1 billion. In 2016, there were only 27 such companies in Europe, compared to much larger numbers in Asia and North America. The European Commission has promoted the creation of the GAIA-X platform to provide the European Union with digital autonomy, aiming to reduce reliance on American and Chinese platform providers.

=== North America ===
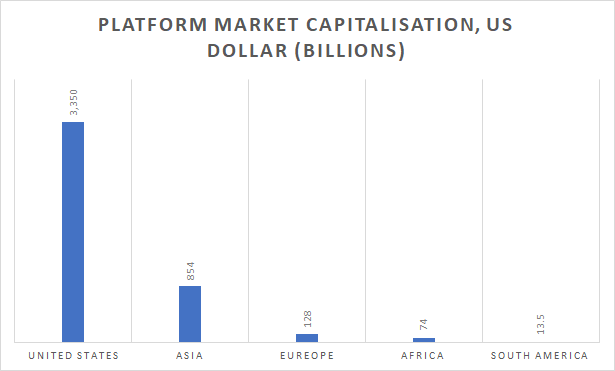
Market capitalization of platform companies by region, based on 2015 United Nations data

North America, particularly the United States, remains the global leader in platform companies by market capitalization. A 2016 survey found that 63 US-based platform companies were valued over $1 billion, with 44 located in the San Francisco Bay Area. These companies, including Google, Amazon, Apple, and Facebook, accounted for 52% of the global market value of platform companies.

=== South America ===
As of early 2016, South America had only three platform companies valued over $1 billion: MercadoLibre, Despegar.com, and B2W. The region is home to a number of startups, particularly in Brazil and Argentina, where the local market has encouraged a global outlook.

The platform-based gig economy has not grown as fast in South America as in other regions, partially due to a large informal labor market. However, some scholars have noted that Latin America's tradition of worker-organized activism may provide valuable lessons for workers in other regions facing economic challenges posed by platforms.

== Assessment ==
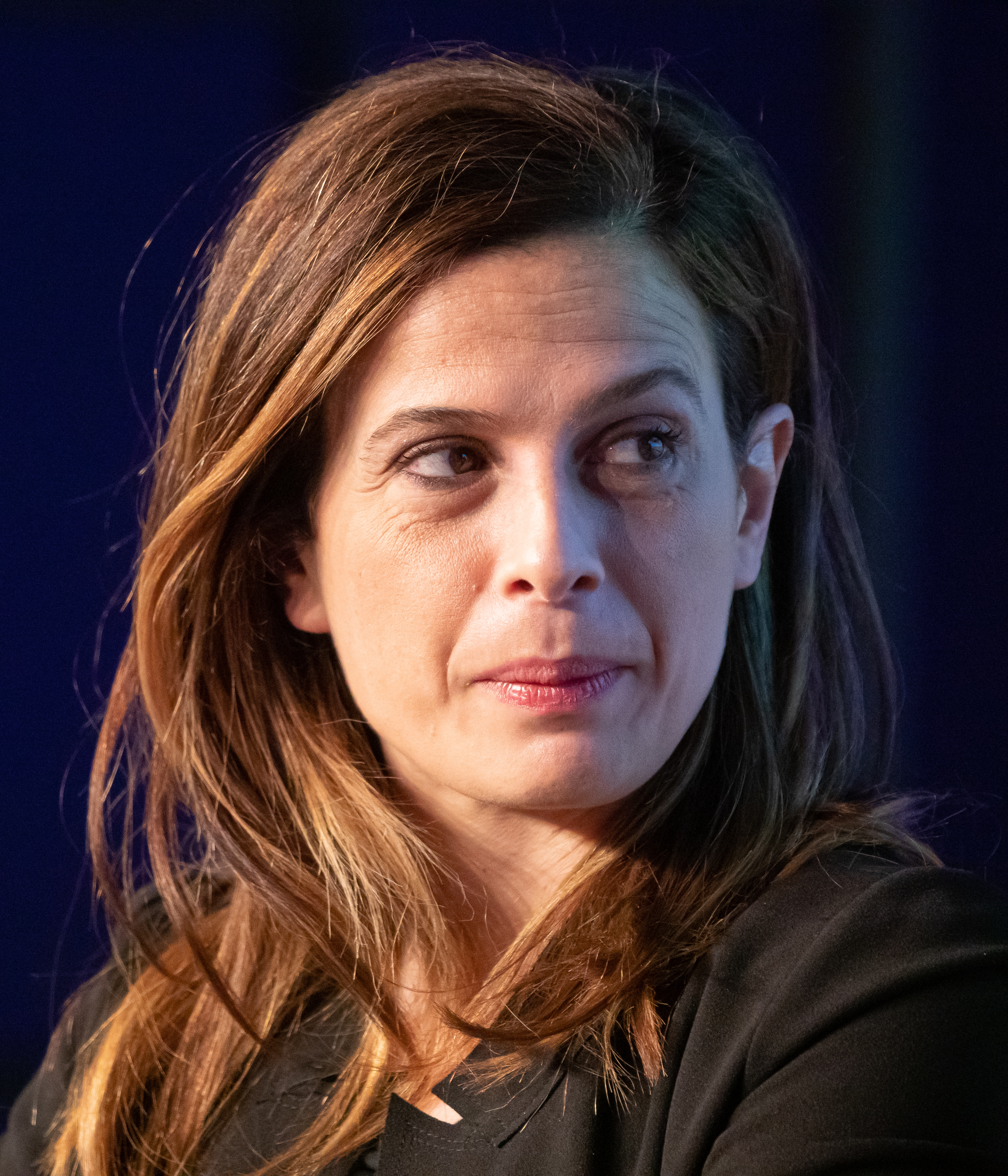
Francesca Bria, an early critic of large privately owned platforms and an advocate for platform cooperativism

The rise of digital platforms following the 2008 financial crisis intensified interest in their impact on society and the global economy. Numerous assessments have been carried out by scholars, think tanks, and governments, focusing on both the overall platform economy and narrower aspects such as the gig economy and social media's psychological effects.

Early reviews were largely positive, suggesting that platforms could enhance services, increase productivity, reduce inefficiencies, and create new markets. The International Monetary Fund (IMF) and World Bank also noted the potential for platform technology to drive growth in less developed countries.

However, critics have argued that platforms may exacerbate issues like technological unemployment, precarious work conditions, and income inequality. Platforms have also been linked to declining tax revenues and the potential for damaging effects on mental health and community well-being.

== Social and environmental externalities ==
=== Effects on employment ===
The platform ecosystem has introduced two primary types of jobs: on-demand work, which involves offline tasks such as cleaning, and crowdwork, where tasks are performed virtually. Advocates highlight the accessibility, flexibility, and low entry barriers of these employment opportunities, while critics emphasize their precarious nature.

Platform economy workers are typically classified as independent contractors or self-employed, a designation that exempts platforms from providing traditional labor protections such as minimum wage, sick leave, and other standards. While flexibility helps some workers, such as caregivers, manage their workloads, it also leads to job insecurity and lower earnings. Many gig economy workers earn below-average pay, exacerbating income inequality.

=== Effects on consumer and societal risks ===
Platforms have disrupted industries such as taxis and hotels, displacing traditional service providers while formalizing previously informal sectors. This restructuring centralizes value capture under platform owners.

Dominant platforms frequently use exclusivity agreements to lock in users and merchants. While these practices increase profitability for the platforms, they limit consumer choice, stifle competition, and create inefficiencies. Critics argue that such practices exploit consumers and merchants.

Proponents of platforms argue that they democratize entrepreneurship by liberating underutilized assets, such as rooms through Airbnb or vehicles through Uber. However, detractors counter that platforms concentrate wealth and exacerbate economic inequalities. In sectors such as e-commerce and food delivery, exclusivity agreements can further restrict competition, reducing overall societal welfare.

=== Effects on markets ===
Platforms continue to disrupt traditional markets by displacing established providers and reorganizing industries. For instance, ride-sharing apps and short-term rental platforms centralize value capture while replacing conventional service providers.

Dominant platforms often employ exclusivity agreements to maintain control over users and merchants. These agreements reduce consumer choice and hinder competition, contributing to inefficiencies in the market. Although platforms claim to foster entrepreneurship and better resource utilization, critics highlight their role in creating wealth disparities and limiting economic opportunity. This is particularly evident in sectors such as food delivery and online retail.

=== Post-2017 backlash ===
By 2017, attitudes toward platforms had begun to shift, with some commentators expressing concern over their growing power and influence. In the U.S., tech companies that were once lauded became subjects of growing scrutiny from both ends of the political spectrum. Figures like Evgeny Morozov labeled many platforms "parasitic", feeding off existing social and economic structures.

Increased regulation followed in regions like Europe and China, with major platforms facing allegations of anti-competitive practices and calls for stronger oversight.

Though platform companies experienced increased scrutiny, many remained popular among consumers, as demonstrated by strong financial results in early 2018. By 2021, the "techlash" narrative continued, with further regulatory challenges arising in the U.S., Europe, and China.

==== Platform decay ====
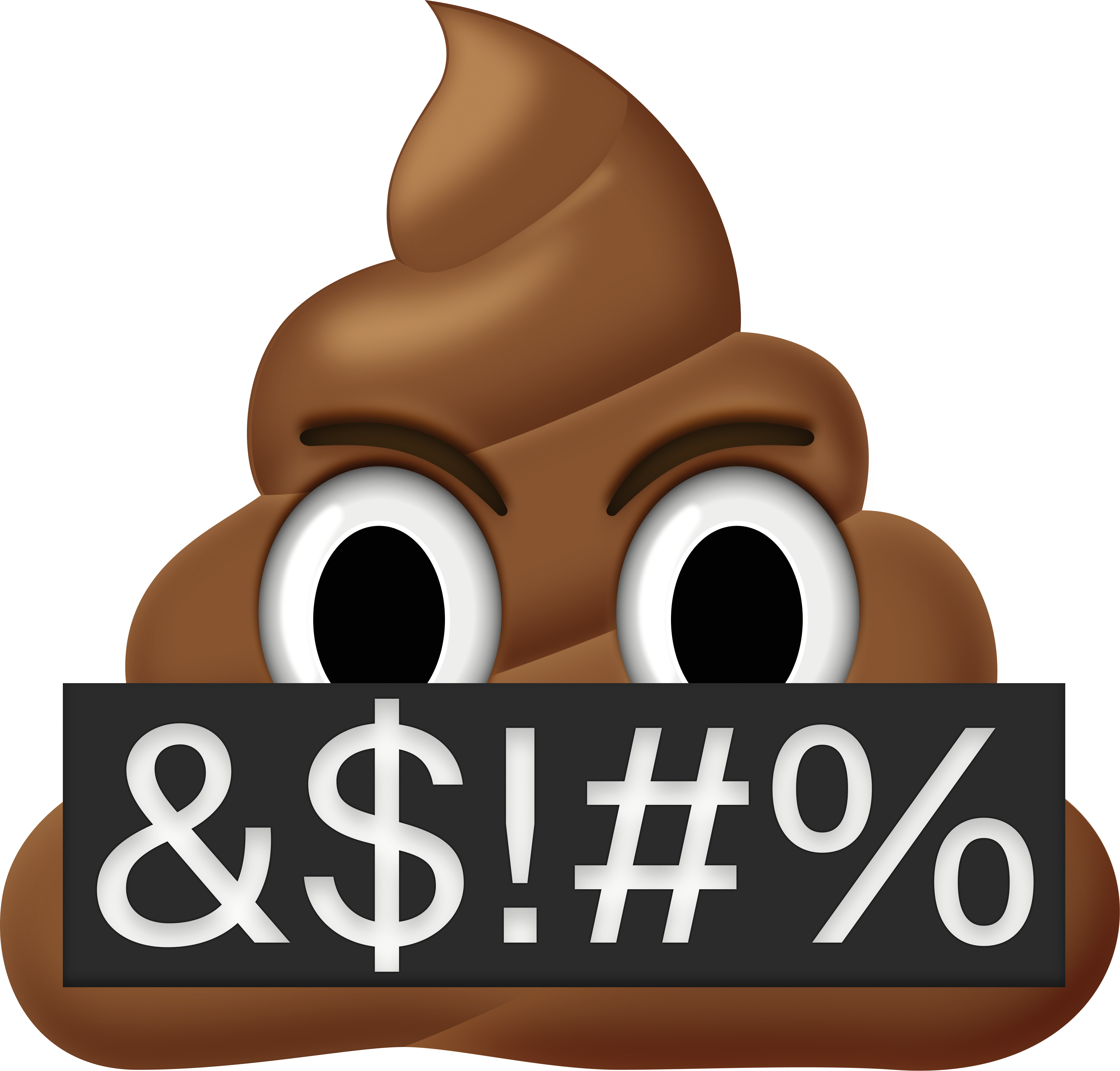
The poop emoji representation of enshittification from the cover of Doctorow's 2025 book Enshittification: Why Everything Suddenly Got Worse and What to Do About It

Enshittification, also known as platform decay, is a process in which two-sided online products and services decline in quality over time. Initially, vendors create high-quality offerings to attract users. Over time, they degrade those offerings to better serve business customers. Ultimately, they degrade their services to both users and business customers to maximise short-term profits for shareholders.

The term was popularised by Canadian writer Cory Doctorow in 2022. The American Dialect Society selected enshittification as its 2023 Word of the Year, with Australia's Macquarie Dictionary following suit for 2024.

== Regulation ==
In their early stages, digital platforms benefited from light regulation, often aided by policies designed to support emerging internet companies. However, the cross-border nature of platforms has made regulation complex. Another challenge is the lack of consensus on what constitutes the platform economy. Critics argue that current laws are insufficient for regulating platform-based businesses, pointing to concerns such as safety standards, tax compliance, labor rights, and competition.

Two contrasting regulatory approaches have emerged in the United States and China. In the U.S., platforms have generally operated with limited government oversight. In contrast, China tightly regulates its platform companies, such as Tencent and Baidu, while also shielding them from foreign competition in the domestic market.

In March 2018, the European Union introduced guidelines for the removal of illegal content from social media platforms, warning that stricter regulations would follow if companies did not improve self-regulation. The OECD is exploring regulation of platform work, while the European Commission has launched initiatives to improve working conditions for platform workers. On 15 December 2020, the Commission proposed two key regulations: the Digital Services Act and the Digital Markets Act, aimed at increasing accountability and competition in the platform economy.

Labor unions have increasingly represented platform workers. The Fairwork Foundation has been working to establish globally agreeable working conditions, involving collaboration with platform owners, workers, unions, and governments.

In China, the growth of the platform economy has drawn attention from regulators. On 18 January 2022, the National Development and Reform Commission and seven other departments published guidelines proposing future regulations for the platform economy.

In 2023, a German group of researchers at the Humboldt University of Berlin expressed their support for the empowerment of platform councils as proposed in the 2021 coalition agreement of the Scholz cabinet. The idea was to empower these councils similar to customers' advisory boards and works councils to exert a degree of self-administration over user data and introduce a democratic participation in platform governance.

== See also ==
- Circular economy
- Customer to customer
- Digital ecosystem
- Gig economy
- Gig worker
- List of gig economy companies
- Platform capitalism
- Platform evangelism
- Two-sided market
- Uberisation
- Digital services act
