= Courtney =

Courtney may refer to:

== People ==
- Courtney (given name)
- Courtney (surname)

== Places ==
=== In the United States ===
- Courtney, Missouri, an unincorporated community
- Courtney, North Carolina, an unincorporated community in Yadkin County
- Courtney, Pennsylvania, a neighborhood of the borough of New Eagle
- Courtney Peak (Washington)

=== Elsewhere ===
- Courtney Peak (Antarctica), Ellsworth Land, Antarctica
- Courtney (crater), a tiny lunar impact crater
- Camp Courtney, a United States Marine Base in Gushikawa, Okinawa, Japan

== Other ==
- USS Courtney, several United States Navy ships
- Courtney Buses, a bus operating company based in Bracknell, Berkshire, England

== See also ==
- Courtenay (disambiguation)
