= Christ Church, East Stour =

Church in Dorset, England

Christ Church
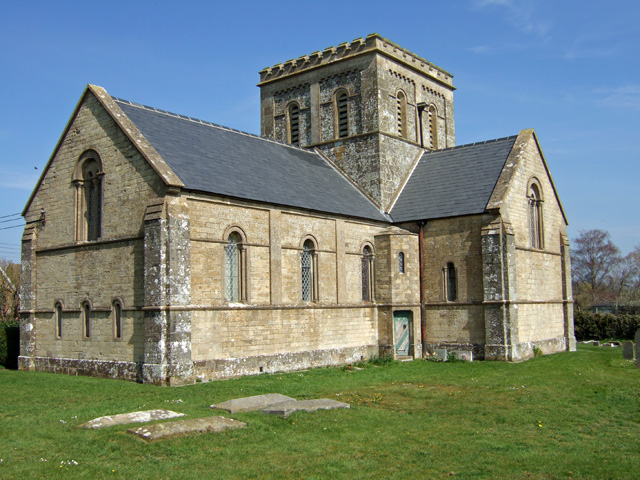

Religion
- Affiliation: Church of England
- Ecclesiastical or organizational status: Active
- Year consecrated: 1842

Location
- Location: East Stour, Dorset, England
- Interactive map of Christ Church
- Coordinates: 51.0045°N 2.2882°W

Architecture
- Architect: George Alexander
- Type: Church
- Style: Neo-Norman, Romanesque

Christ Church is a Church of England parish church in East Stour, Dorset, England. The church, a Grade II listed building, was designed by George Alexander and built in 1841–42. Today the church forms part of the Stour Vale Benefice.

== History ==
Christ Church was built in 1841–42 to replace a medieval church which, by the mid-19th century, was in a dilapidated condition and had become too small to serve the village's inhabitants. The church had seating for 140 people, but the population of East Stour had reached over 500 by 1840.

The replacement of the church was initiated through the efforts of the vicar of Gillingham, Rev. Henry Deane The old church was demolished in 1839, and plans for the new church were drawn up by George Alexander of London, who would also supervise its construction. As a larger building than its predecessor, it was designed to accommodate 400 people.

In October 1840, the Salisbury Diocesan Church Building Association granted £150 towards the rebuilding cost. The completed church was consecrated by the Bishop of Salisbury, the Right Rev. Edward Denison, on 1 April 1842.

The church underwent renovation in 1866, which included staining and varnishing its woodwork and improving the interior. Much of the approximate £100 cost was raised by voluntary contributions by the parishioners. The organ, built by Henry Bevington of London, was installed in 1877 and first used on 1 November. The churchyard was extended in 1908 after an adjoining plot of land was gifted by Lord Stalbridge. It was consecrated by the Bishop of Salisbury, the Right Rev. John Wordsworth, on 10 April 1908.

The church underwent alteration and improvement work between 1934 and 1939. A south vestry and north porch were built as additions to the existing building, and the gallery at the west end of the nave was removed, allowing the organ to be re-sited there from the south wall of the nave. The chancel was opened up, new stone paving laid and electric lighting installed. The altar was rearranged and provided with a new frontal, curtains, cross and candlesticks. Two clergy stalls of oak were also added at the entrance to the chancel and two Persian rugs added to the sanctuary. The work amounted to an approximate £485 and was dedicated by the Bishop of Salisbury, the Right Rev. Neville Lovett, on 26 February 1939.

The church organ was restored by Geo Osmond & Co of Taunton in 1972. In the early 21st century, repairs were carried on the nave and tower, and kitchen facilities and a disabled toilet were installed.

== Architecture ==
Christ Church is built of local limestone ashlar, with Greensand dressings and slate-covered roofs. It has a cruciform plan, made up of a nave, north and south transepts, chancel, south vestry, north porch and a one-stage crossing tower. The galleries of the transepts are accessed by octagonal stair turrets on the west exterior of the church.

Some of the old church's fittings were transferred to the new church, most notably the stone font's square bowl which is of Purbeck Marble and 12th-century date. It sits on a round shaft of sandstone and plain rectangular base of limestone, both of 19th-century date. The lectern depicts a carved pelican and is 18th-century on an early 20th-century base. The church also contains an oak bible box of 17th-century date and two oak chests of 18th-century date. The tower's bell dates to the 16th-century. The pulpit is of early 20th-century date, replacing an earlier one from the 1841–42 rebuild.

The church has a number of round-headed single-light and two-light windows. The stained glass in the small windows of the chancel date to the church's 1841–42 rebuild. The stained glass added by Mr. T. Everett in memory of his wife in 1872 was designed by Clayton and Bell of London and carried out by Mr. J. M. Jenkins of Salisbury. The east window, which is round-headed and of three-lights, was installed in memory of Rev. Deane, who died in 1882.
