= John Courtenay =

John Courtenay may refer to:

- John Courtenay of Tremere (c. 1520 – 1560), MP for Lostwithiel, Bodmin and Penryn in the United Kingdom
- John Courtenay, 15th Earl of Devon (c. 1435 – 1471)
- John Courtenay (1738–1816), Member of Parliament for Tamworth and Appleby in the United Kingdom
- John Courtenay Trewin (1908–1990), English journalist and writer

== See also ==
- John Courtney (disambiguation)
- Jon Courtenay Grimwood, British science fiction writer
