= John Courtney =

John or Jack Courtney may refer to:

- John Edgar Courtney (born 1934), Australian ornithologist
- J. Ira Courtney (1888–1968), American athlete
- John Mortimer Courtney (1838–1920), Canadian civil servant
- John Courtney (MP), Member of Parliament (MP) for Bodmin
- John Courtney (diarist) (1734–1806), of Beverley, Yorkshire, England
- John Courtney (playwright) (1804–1865), playwright, dramatic actor and comedian
- Jack Courtney (figure skater) (born 1953), American pair skater
- Jack Courtney (rugby league) (1901–1948), Australian rugby league player

== See also ==
- John Courtenay (disambiguation)
- Jon Courtney, singer and guitarist in British band Pure Reason Revolution
- Jonathan Courtney (born 1966), Maine politician
- John Courtney Murray (1904–1967), Jesuit priest, theologian, and prominent American intellectual
