= All Saints' Church, Stour Row =

Church in Dorset, England

All Saints' Church
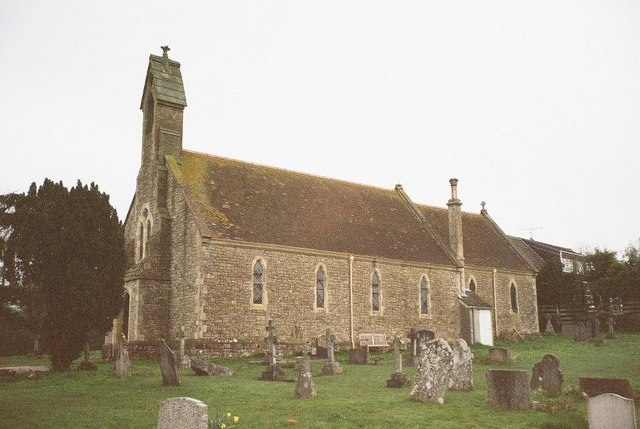

Religion
- Affiliation: Church of England
- Ecclesiastical or organizational status: Active
- Year consecrated: 1878

Location
- Location: Stour Row, Dorset, England
- Interactive map of All Saints' Church
- Coordinates: 50.9894°N 2.2539°W

Architecture
- Architect: John Hicks
- Type: Church
- Style: Early English
- Completed: 1867

All Saints' Church is a former Church of England church in Stour Row, Dorset, England. The church, a Grade II listed building, was designed by John Hicks and built in 1867. The church formed part of the Stour Vale Benefice and was closed in 2015.

== History ==
All Saints was built as a chapel of ease to the parish church of St Michael and All Angels at Stour Provost. The building of the chapel of ease was initiated through the efforts of the rector of Stour Provost, Rev. Richard Arthur Francis Barrett. At the time, the parish had a population of 900, however 400 of them were at least a mile and a half from the parish church, and some up to three miles. Furthermore, St Michael was only able to accommodate around 300 people.

The plans for the new church were drawn up by John Hicks of Dorchester, with accommodation for 146 people, and all seats free and unappropriated. A plot of land was gifted jointly by Rev. Barrett and the patrons of the benefice and principal landowners, King's College. Much of the £1,200 cost of building the church was raised by subscription, with some of the substantial contributors being the Marchioness of Westminster, King's College, Mr. A. Morrison and Rev. Barrett. By April 1867, £680 had been raised and an additional £120 was granted by the Salisbury Diocesan Church Building Association that month.

The church's foundation stone was laid by Miss Thomas, the niece of Rev. Barrett, 20 June 1867. The ceremony was marked by a service held by Rev. Barrett and Rev. F. Wilkinson, which was attended by approximately 200 people. The church, which was built by Mr. Miles of Shaftesbury, was opened for Divine service in 1867, with the roofing-in of the building being marked by an event on 26 September. An approximate 300 parishioners took part in an outdoor tea on the day, which also saw some sport events held and music played by the Sturminster Newton band.

Although licensed for Divine service, the church's consecration was postponed on a number of occasions, due to part of its grounds being held on lease and used as a garden. The consecration was able to take place once the land was incorporated back into the burial ground. The church and its burial ground were consecrated by the Bishop of Salisbury, the Right Rev. George Moberly, on 29 June 1878.

=== 2015 closure and sale ===
Due to declining congregation numbers, All Saints closed in 2015, with the last service being held on 18 October. Its closure officially came into effect from 1 November, when the parish was united with Stour Provost. The church was then placed on the market and in October 2018, the Church Commissioners published a draft Pastoral (Church Buildings Disposal) scheme for the church and part of its churchyard to be sold and converted for residential use. The draft scheme was granted planning permission in March 2019.

A potential buyer was found and planning permission was approved in December 2019 to convert the church into a three-bedroom dwelling, erect a single storey extension and create a lay-by for one vehicle. A revised scheme to increase the lay-by space to accommodate two vehicles was approved in March 2020. Meanwhile, the Pastoral scheme was finalised by the Church Commissioners in January 2020, but the following month saw the buyer withdraw and the church was then placed back on the market. The majority of the churchyard is included in the sale, except for the section containing more recent burials.

== Architecture ==
All Saints is built of Marnhull stone, with Bath stone dressings and clay tile roofs. It is made up of a four-bay nave, two-bay chancel, north vestry and west porch. There is a bell-cot for a single bell on the west gable. The nave's collar beam roof has curved braces, with principals supported on stone corbels. The chancel roof is also arch-braced with a cusped collar. At the time of its closure, the church retained many of its original 19th-century fittings, including the octagonal stone font, octagonal wooden pulpit and the seating.

=== Windows ===
The church's trefoiled single-light windows were all filled with plain cathedral glass in 1867. The east window is of three-lights and the west window, added in 1882, is of two-lights.

In 1882, stained glass made by Alexander Gibbs was added to the east window in memory of the rector Rev. Barrett, who died in 1881. The cost of the memorial was raised by subscription, and it depicts the crucifixion, with figures of St Mary and St John. Later in the year, the west end two-light window was added by the farmer James Stone of the village in memory of his son Stephen. The window was inserted and wired by Mr. J. New of Shaftesbury.

In 1907, two stained glass windows made by Clayton and Bell of London were added to the church by Thomas William Lush of Gillingham in memory of his wife, who was buried in the churchyard on 22 January 1907. One is inscribed "Our Lord and Martha", the other "St. Mary anointing our Lord's feet." In 1908, a third stained glass window was added by Mr. Lush in memory of his parents, Thomas and Elizabeth. The window, also made by Clayton and Bell, depicts St. Thomas.

== Churchyard ==
The churchyard wall was rebuilt in c. 1928 by Mr. F. Pike & Son. The churchyard was extended during the 1990s with additional land to the south by Green Lane. In 1993, a wildlife conservation area was established within the grounds, with regular surveying carried out by Dorset Wildlife Trust.
