= Joe Courtney =

Joe or Joseph Courtney may refer to:

- Joe Courtney (basketball) (born 1969), American basketball player
- Joe Courtney (politician) (born 1953), American lawyer and politician in Connecticut
- Joseph Courtney (American football) (1884–1922), American gridiron football player and coach
- Joseph Edward "Tedda" Courtney (1883–1957), Australian rugby league footballer and coach

== See also ==
- Joel Courtney
- Courtney (surname)
