= Courtney A. Miller =

American neuroscientist, researcher

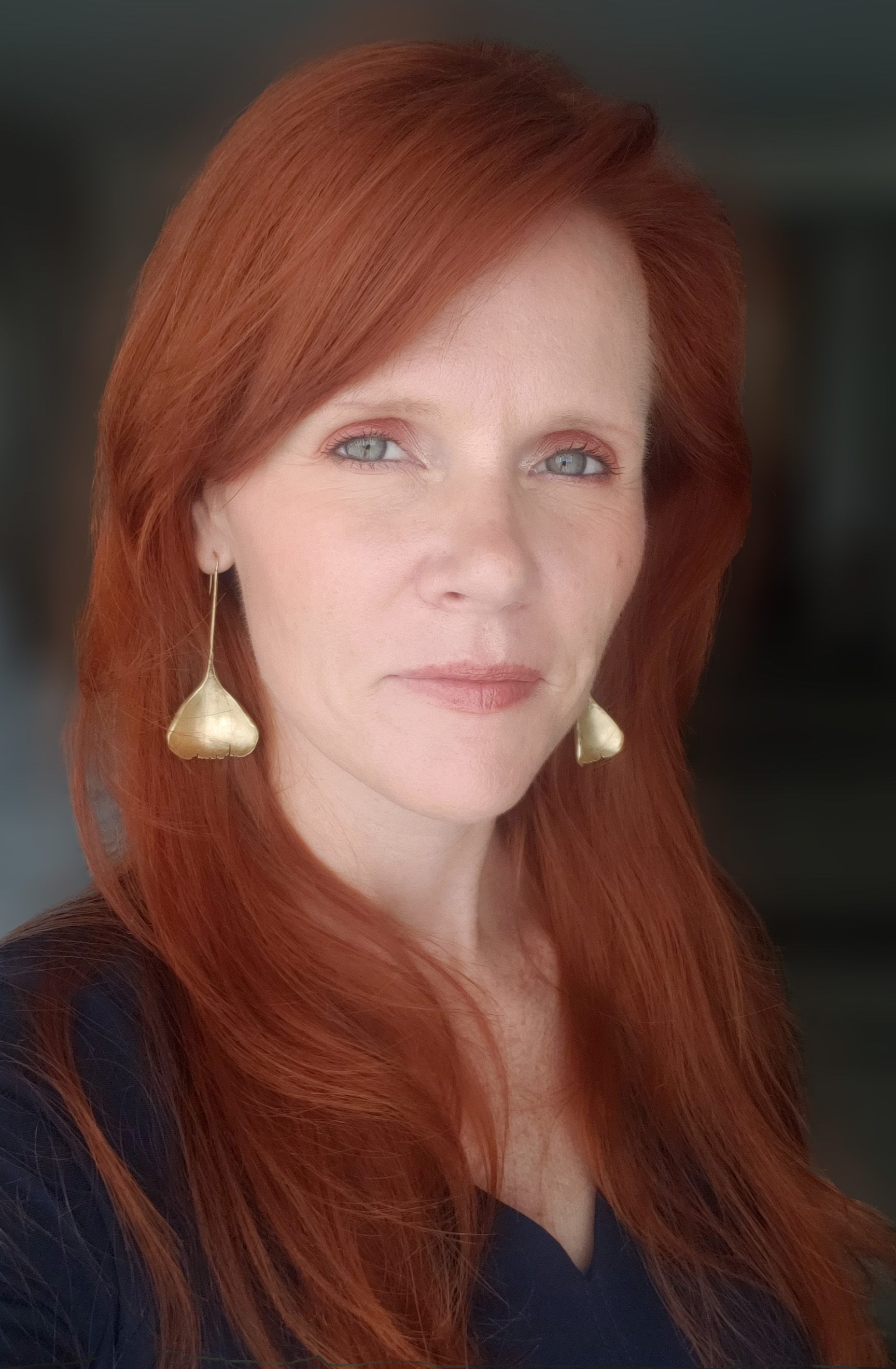
- Education: University of California, Santa Barbara, University of California, Irvine, University of Alabama Birmingham
- Known for: Discovery that the drug Blebbistatin leads to long-lasting disruption in methamphetamine drug seeking
- Awards: Presidential Early Career Award for Scientists and Engineers, Most influential paper published by Neuron in 2007, Kauffman Fellow, NIDA Young Investigator Award
- Scientific career
- Fields: Neuroscience
- Workplaces: The Scripps Research Institute, Florida

Courtney A. Miller is an American neuroscientist and Professor of the Department of Molecular Medicine at the Scripps Research Institute in Jupiter, Florida. Miller investigates the biological basis of neurological and neuropsychiatric diseases and develops novel therapeutics based on her mechanistic discoveries.

== Early life and education ==
Miller completed her undergraduate degree at the University of California, Santa Barbara majoring in Biopsychology. After graduating in 1999, Miller started her PhD in Neurobiology and Behavior at the University of California, Irvine. Under the mentorship of Dr. John F. Marshall, Miller studied the biological basis of drug addiction in rodent models. Her findings suggested that memories of drug-cue pairings can be pharmacologically or therapeutically ameliorated to potentially reduce relapse in drug abusers.

Miller completed her PhD in 2005 and then worked as a Research Scientist at Cenomed Pharmaceuticals. In 2006, Miller began a postdoctoral fellowship at the University of Alabama Birmingham Miller studied neuroepigenetics and found that DNA methylation along with the process of histone acetylation regulates memory formation and synaptic plasticity.

== Career and research ==
In 2009, Miller was appointed an assistant professorship at The Scripps Research Institute in Jupiter, Florida. In 2013, Miller was granted tenure and conducts research on neurological diseases with a specific focus on drug addiction and post-traumatic stress disorder.

In 2015, Miller and her lab discovered a potential method to target the actin cytoskeleton as a means to treat relapsing methamphetamine addiction. In 2017, Miller and her group further explored the effects of Blebbistatin, a small molecular non-muscle myosin II inhibitor, on methamphetamine-related memories compared to cocaine and morphine-related memories. They found that the effects of Blebbistatin on memory disruption are specific to methamphetamine-related memories and they are amygdala-dependent. For this discovery, Miller was honored with the Presidential Early Career Award and received a five-year research grant.

In 2019, Miller and her group found a microRNA in the amygdala that is specifically elevated after trauma. Miller and her group further found that inhibiting this microRNA interfered with expression and extinction of fear memories. The difference in microRNA mir-598-3p level and the effect of its inhibition was only observed in male but not female mice.

== Awards and achievements ==
- Presidential Early Career Award for Scientists and Engineers, awarded by President Obama (2016)
- Distinguished Speaker Award, UNC Department of Psychology and Neuroscience (2016)
- TSRI Outstanding Mentor Award (2015)
- Most influential paper published by Neuron in 2007 (2014)
- Kauffman Fellow, Venture Capital Program (2008)
- NIDA Young Investigator Award (2005)

== Select publications ==
- Miller CA and Marshall JF (2005). Molecular substrates for retrieval and reconsolidation of cocaine-associated contextual memory. Neuron 47, 873–84.
- Levenson MJ, Roth TL, Lubin FD, Miller CA, Huang IC, Desai P, Malone L, Sweatt JD (2006). Evidence that DNA (Cytosine-5) methyltransferases regulate synaptic plasticity in the hippocampus. Journal of Biological Chemistry 281, 15763–73.
- Miller CA and Sweatt JD (2007). Covalent modification of DNA regulates memory formation. Neuron 53, 857–69.
- Miller CA, Susan Campbell and Sweatt JD (2008). DNA methylation and histone acetylation work in concert to regulate memory formation and synaptic plasticity. Neurobiology Learning and Memory 89, 599–603.
- Kilgore M*, Miller CA*, Fass DM, Hennig KM, Haggerty S, Sweatt JD and Rumbaugh G (2010). Inhibitors of Class I histone deacetylases reverse contextual memory deficits in a mouse model of Alzheimer's Disease. Neuropsychopharmacology 35, 870–80.
- Miller CA, Gavin CF, White JA, Parrish RR, Honasoge A, Yancey CR, Rivera IM, Rubio MD, Rumbaugh G and Sweatt JD (2010) Cortical DNA methylation maintains remote memory. Nature Neuroscience 13: 664–6.
