= Courtney MacIntosh =

Canadian rower

Courtney MacIntosh (born December 12, 1983, in Oshawa, Ontario) is a Canadian rower from St. John's, Newfoundland and Labrador.

At the 2006 Commonwealth Rowing Championships, she won two silver medals for Canada. She was a gold medalist at the 2009 USRowing National Championships. She studied kinesiology at the University of Texas at Austin and law at The University of Western Ontario.
