= USS Courtney =

USS Courtney has been the name of more than one United States Navy ship, and may refer to:

- USS Courtney (SP-375), a patrol vessel, originally named William J. Courtney, in commission from 1917 to 1919
- USS Courtney (DE-1021), a destroyer escort in commission from 1956 to 1973

See also

- USS Courtenay P (SP-899), a patrol boat in commission from 1917 to 1918
