= Courtney Adeleye =

American businesswoman

- Born: Detroit, Michigan, U.S.
- Education: University of Michigan
- Occupations: Entrepreneur, businesswoman
- Years active: 2013–present
- Organization(s): The Mane Choice; Watch & Sea
- Known for: Founder and CEO of The Mane Choice
- Title: Founder and CEO

Courtney Adeleye is an American entrepreneur, CEO and founder of Mane Choice, a hair care products company. Her initial investment was $500, and the company, as of 2018, has $25 million in sales.

== Background and career ==
Adeleye was raised in Detroit, Michigan. While studying nursing at the University of Michigan, she started experimenting with hair care products for herself. She started a YouTube channel where she would create products to use on her own hair.

Her products are now in over 20,000 retail stores, including over 90 hair treatments and vitamins. The Mane Choice was acquired by MAV Beauty Brands in 2019.

In 2024, she announced her new brand, Watch & Sea, a hair care brand.

== Philanthropy ==
She launched Pay My Bill, which pays off a bill for one of her Instagram followers each month. As of 2018, she had paid off more than 150 bills.

== Awards ==
Adeleye's awards include the 2017 Stevie Silver Winner for Women in Business, 2017 CurlBOX Award, and the Fall 2017 Beauty O-Ward by O Magazine.
