= Kortney Olson =

American-born bodybuilder and athlete (born 1981)

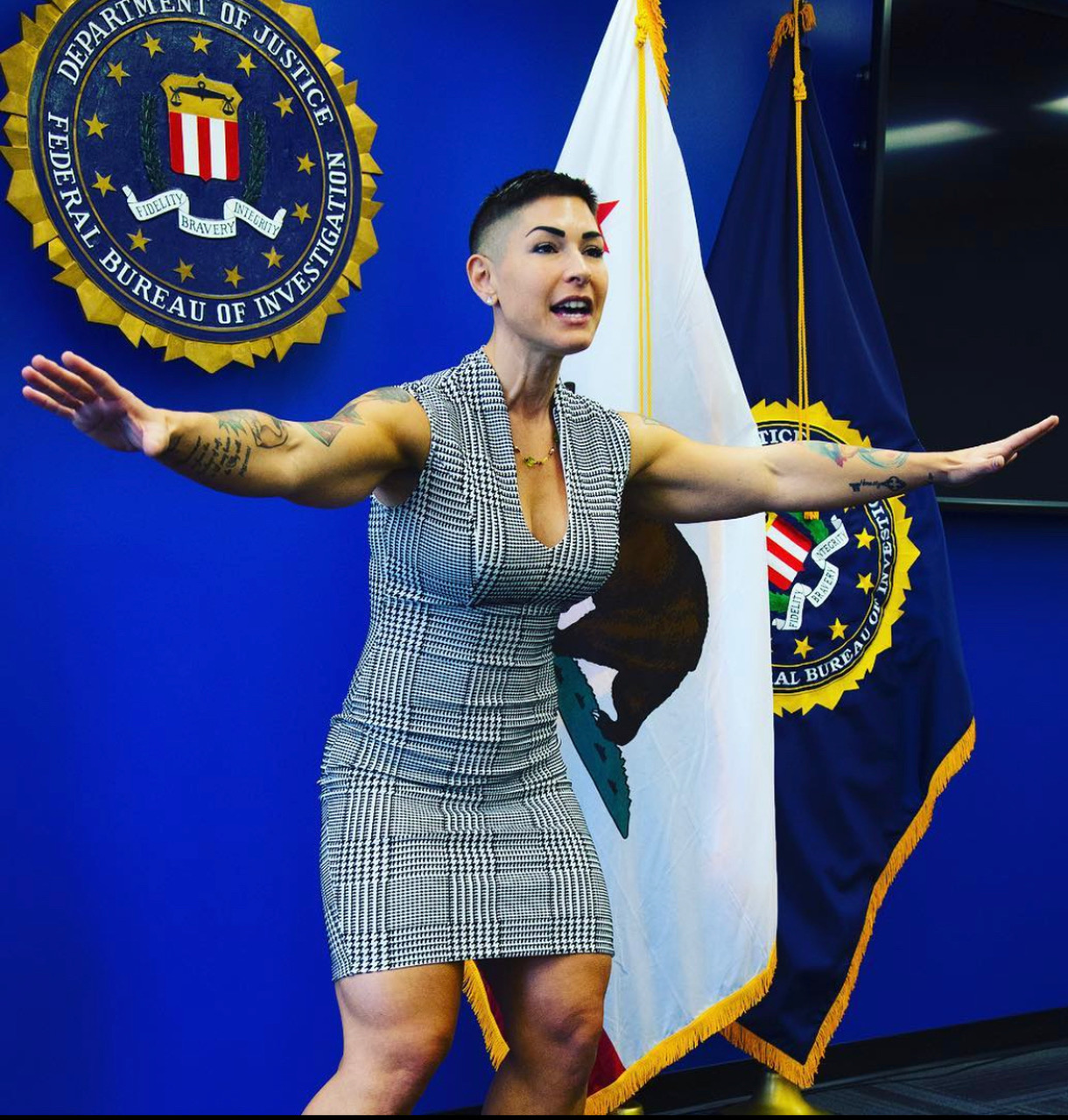
Olson giving a talk at the FBI

Kortney Olson (born 9 November 1981) is an American-Australian bodybuilder, personal trainer, and athlete.

== Biography ==
Olson is a native of Humboldt County in Northern California, and grew up attending St. Bernard's High School in Eureka, California. She said that she was inspired to start bodybuilding from a young age, partly due to her admiration for her older brother and partly due to her having purportedly been molested as a seven year old. She said her path to bodybuilding opened after responding to a Craigslist ad for a muscular calf model.

Olson made her competitive bodybuilding debut at the NPC Contra Costa Classic in November 2011.

Olson migrated to Australia and became Australia's first-ever female arm wrestling champion in 2012.

Olson has been the subject of many TV documentaries showcasing her strength and muscularity, including Stan Lee's Superhumans season 3 - "High Voltage", where scientists claimed in testing that she had the "strongest thighs on the planet".

She is also the founder of Kamp Konfidence, a camp which empowers, encourages, and improves young girls and women's wellbeing.

In March 2020, Olson was a featured guest in the fourth episode of former Congresswoman Tulsi Gabbard's podcast, where she talked about her long battle with alcoholism from when she was 17 years old and still in high school, after she became the victim of rape; her past methamphetamine addiction, which she developed at 23; and her OxyContin addiction, as well as the way she overcame them with the help of Bikram yoga. By December 2020, she had been ten years sober, and reached her eleventh year of sobriety in June 2021. She also mentioned how she used to maintain a 5-day a week routine of CrossFit, Brazilian jiu-jitsu, and Bikram yoga "in the not so distant past".

In January 2021, Olson published her memoir, titled Crushing It: How I Crushed Diet Culture, Addiction, & the Patriarchy.

== Grrrl Clothing ==
Olson is the founder and CEO of women's clothing company and female empowerment movement which has been in existence since 2015 with online stores in USA, Australia, UK and Canada, Grrrl Clothing, stylized "GRRRL." The opening of the first Grrrl store was planned for March 2020, but the open house was delayed to November 2020 due to the COVID-19 pandemic, and her storefront fully opened in June 2021, with an in-store face mask requirement.

== Personal life ==
Olson is married to David May, a former chief executive officer of Gold Coast Titans. She is bisexual.

In 2017, Olson was diagnosed with Graves' disease. She surmised it could have been a side effect of her breast implants, which she has since had removed, as she would develop seromas in her right breast and had to get the fluid drained every three to six months. In the same year, she opened up about embracing her cellulite.
