= Kourtnee Monroe =

American model

Kourtnee Monroe is an American model living in Scotland.

Born in Dallas, Texas, Monroe first moved to New York City in 2015, where she started her modelling career. She has appeared in many magazines, including Maxim, and has worked with modelling agencies in Milan, Rome and Seoul.

After living in New York for almost ten years, Monroe moved to Scotland, where she experienced some culture shock. As of May 2025, she is pursuing a psychology and criminology degree.
