= Courtenay, New Zealand =

Courtenay
- settlement
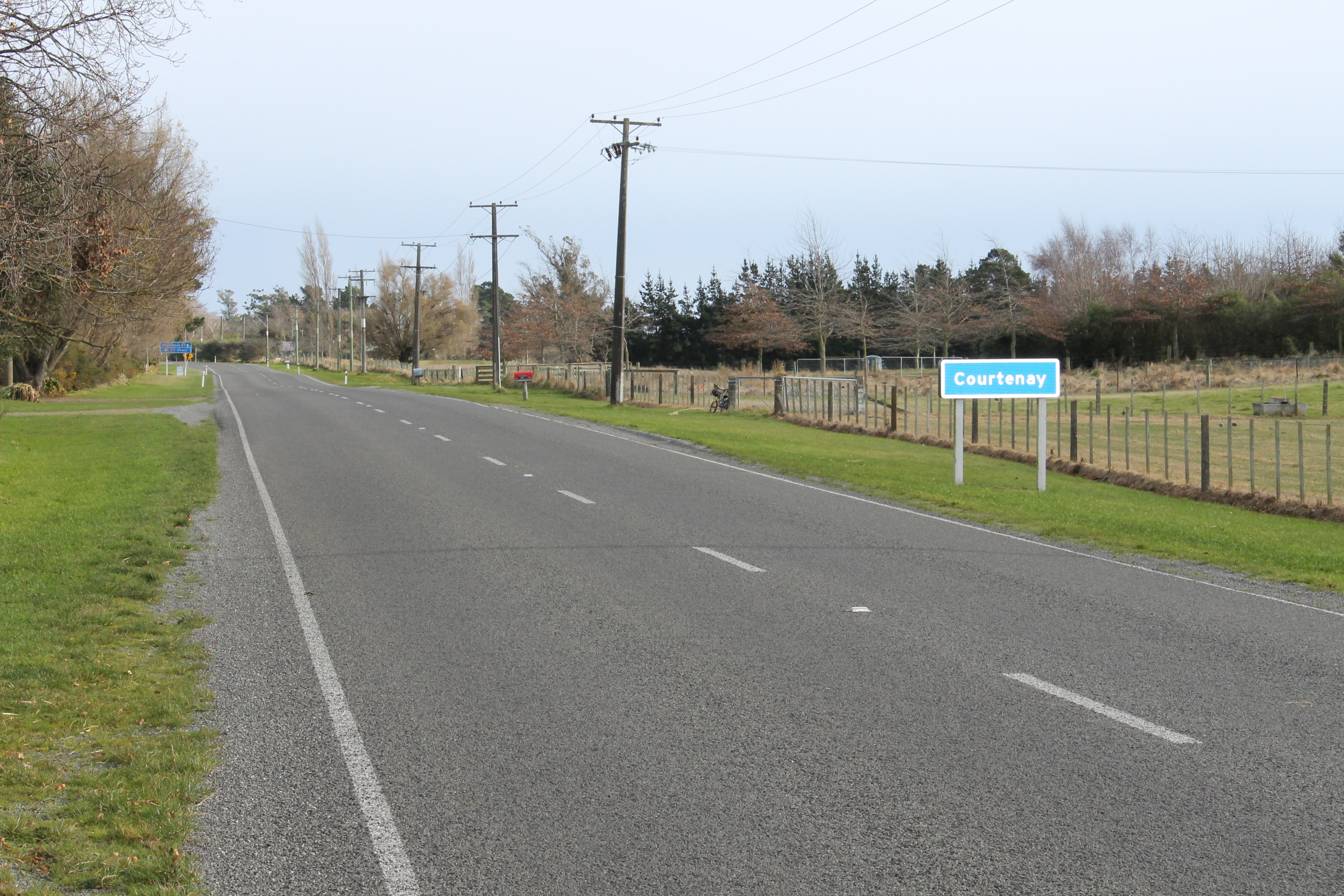
- Old West Coast Road passing through Courtenay

- Location within New Zealand
- Coordinates: 43°27′55″S 172°14′2″E
- Country: New Zealand
- Region: Canterbury
- Territorial authority: Selwyn District
- Time zone: UTC+12 (NZST)
  - Summer (DST): UTC+13 (NZDT)
- Postcode: 7671
- Area code: 03
- Local iwi: Ngāi Tahu

Courtenay is a settlement in inland Canterbury, New Zealand. It was once important as a place where the Waimakariri River could be forded and was a coach stop on the way to the West Coast. Its decline began when the Midland Line was routed via the nearby Kirwee.

== History ==
Early pioneers in Canterbury found it challenging to cross the Waimakariri River, and struggled with its pronunciation. In 1849, the chief surveyor of the Canterbury Association, Joseph Thomas, gave it the name Courtenay River after the Canterbury Association member, Lord Courtenay, but it lapsed into disuse and the river was soon called again by its Māori name. The best opportunity for fording the river was 35 kilometres (22 mi) from Christchurch and the settlement that developed on the south bank at the ford took the European name of the river. When building timber ran low in Christchurch, the logs from the Harewood Forest at Oxford were brought across the river at Courtenay.

Courtenay is a fertile agricultural district. It originally formed part of the Racecourse Hill and Desert runs, the former of which was originally taken up by John Watts-Russell. The latter was bought by the Rev Octavius Mathias for his friend, the Rev John Owen, a member of the Canterbury Association who never came out to New Zealand. Courtenay was one of the earliest settled districts in Canterbury, and among the first residents was Colonel De Renzie Brett.

A hotel was built in 1861 and operated by Charles White, and a store was opened at the township in the days when Cobb & Co coaches ran through it on their way to the West Coast. A second hotel, the Halfway House, was opened by Charles Watson just east of Courtenay. It was so named because it was equidistant to Christchurch and Sheffield, and Cobb & Co made it its breakfast stop on the journey from Christchurch.

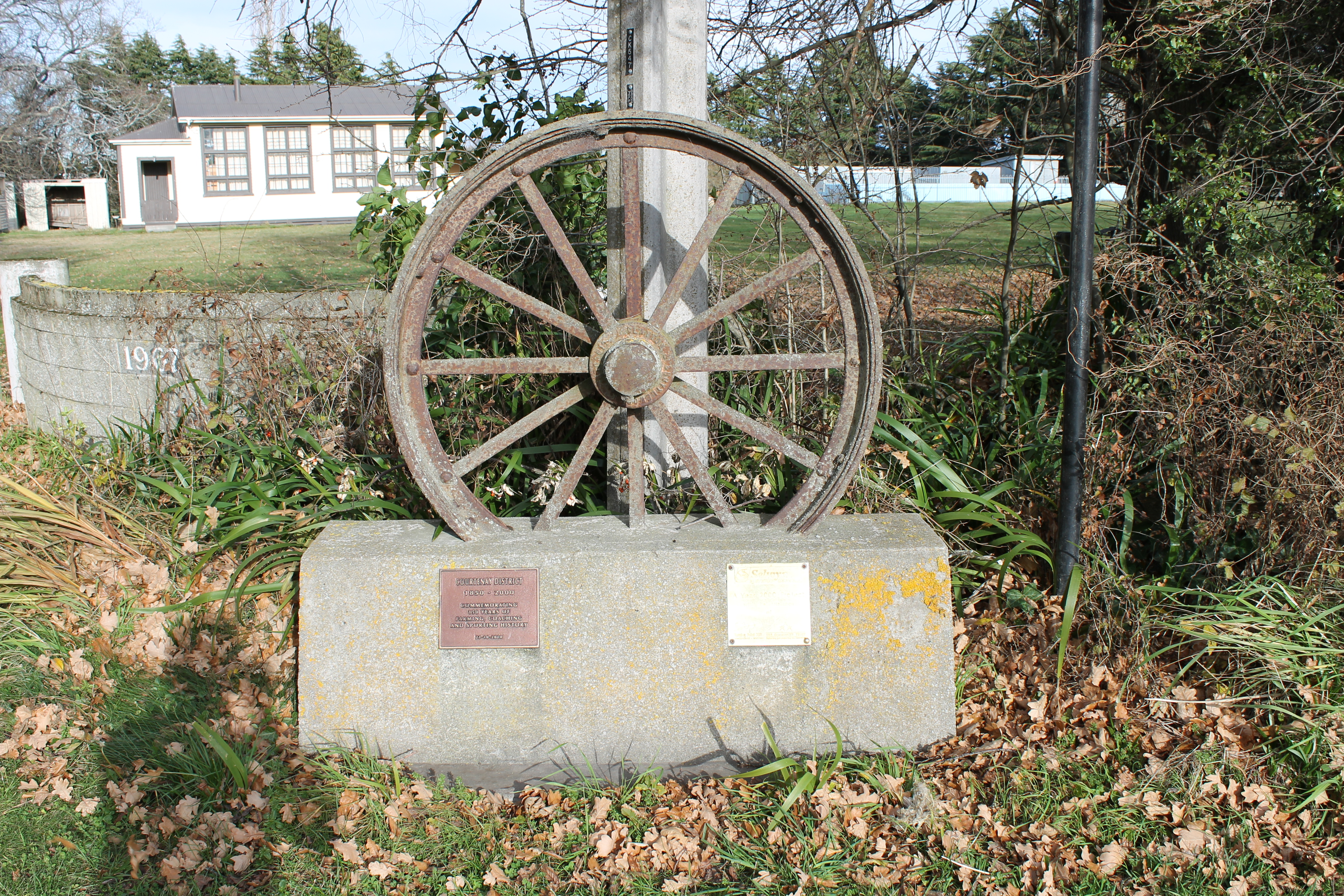
Memorial for 150 years of Courtenay District outside the Courtenay Domain

However, the formation of the railway to Springfield through Kirwee, and the consequent loss of the coach traffic, spoiled the business prospects of the township, and both the hotel and store were subsequently closed. The Courtenay Road Board, of which Colonel Brett was the first chairman, had jurisdiction in the district, and meetings were held at the Courtenay Hotel. Subsequently the Board's headquarters were transferred to Kirwee. The Courtenay Agricultural and Pastoral Association, and a horticultural society, were also formed in the early days, and shows were initially held at the Desert homestead, but later at Kirwee.

St. Matthew's church is an Anglican church, located where Halkett and Woolshed Roads meet. The township had a country model school, i.e. a school where trainee teachers worked under the supervision of experienced teachers. The school closed long ago, but the building is still in existence. Courtenay celebrated its 150th history in 2000, and a memorial is located next to Old West Coast Road.

The Waimakariri River makes a sweeping curve across the Canterbury Plains, and Courtenay is located on its extreme convex point. River terraces are low-lying, and old flood channels starting at Courtenay can easily be recognised on aerial photos. The flood risk was recognised early on, but no action was taken until Christchurch was hit by a devastating flood in February 1868 that saw Victoria Square 1 metre (3 ft 3 in) under water. The Waimakariri flood waters had reached the source of the Avon River in Avonhead, and water rose very quickly in central Christchurch. Subsequently, flood banks were built by the Canterbury Provincial Council.

The Courtenay district gave its name to a general electorate. The 1902 electoral redistribution created six new electorates, including Courtenay. It existed for two parliamentary terms and was abolished for the 1908 election.
