= Steven Courtney =

Steven Courtney is a British biologist and environmental policy expert. He has published extensively on bird and insect ecology, and on animal behavior. He has pioneered the use of independent scientific review as a way to solve environmental disputes. In 2017 Steven Courtney pleaded guilty to five counts of electronic peeping and was sentenced to County Jail. He is now a registered sex offender.

Courtney's scientific research concerns the ecology and evolution of behavior. The 'hierarchy-threshold' model of diet choice, has been useful in understanding how animals (particularly insects) make decisions about resource use. Previously Director of Science at RESOLVE.

His programs include conservation planning for threatened and endangered species, as well as large scale ecosystem management plans. He has also led several investigations into scientific integrity. Beginning in 1997, Courtney led scientific teams that established scientific consensus in the Headwaters Forest controversy, ultimately leading to the development of a Habitat Conservation Plan that brought peaceful resolution to many years of confrontation.

In 2004 Courtney led a team that summarized all scientific information regarding the northern spotted owl. This scientific synthesis altered the tenor of the debate over this iconic species, contributing to a recognition that fire and invasion by the barred owl were just as important threats as timber harvest. This scientific panel recommended the development of the first Recovery Plan to be finalized for the species. However the federal planning process was marred with controversy and accusations of political interference, leading to Courtney's recall to provide transparent and independent scientific evaluations. Ultimately the panel recommended significant changes, which led to a final Recovery Plan, and the current conservation strategy which distinguishes between fire-prone east-side forests and moister west-side forests. The shooting of barred owls to save spotted owls remains controversial.

Courtney has also provided independent scientific evaluations for other controversial issues, such as management of marbled murrelet, sage grouse, the Everglades, and several large North American river systems. He has also led teams investigating allegations of scientific misconduct. In 2014 he led a team of scientists that evaluated the genetics and taxonomic analysis underlying the proposed removal of ESA protections from the wolf. The panel unanimously concluded that the science used was not the best available, a finding that fueled the ongoing controversy over management of the species

In 2000, Courtney survived the crash of Singapore Airlines flight 006. He was recognized with a Red Cross Good Samaritan award for rescue of other passengers.

== Electronic Peeping and Sex Offender ==
In October 2016, Courtney was arrested for installing multiple hidden cameras in the bedroom and shower of a Montecito house he sublet to acquaintances. A police search of Courtney’s computer and cell phone files showed he had been viewing the footage for sexual gratification.

In 2017 he was sentenced to two months in County Jail and will serve 3 years of probation plus restitution fees for the victims. He pleaded guilty to five counts of electronic peeping and had been spying on his tenants for sexual gratification for more than a year. Courtney actively sought to rent out his front house to people he knew while he lived in the back unit. He was caught after one of the tenants found the miniature camera disguised as USB chargers and called the police. He must complete 18-month sex offender therapy and refrain from owning recording devices, including smartphones, for the next three years. Steven Courtney is now a registered sex offender.

Steven Courtney died in California in 2023.
