= Courtenay (New Zealand electorate) =

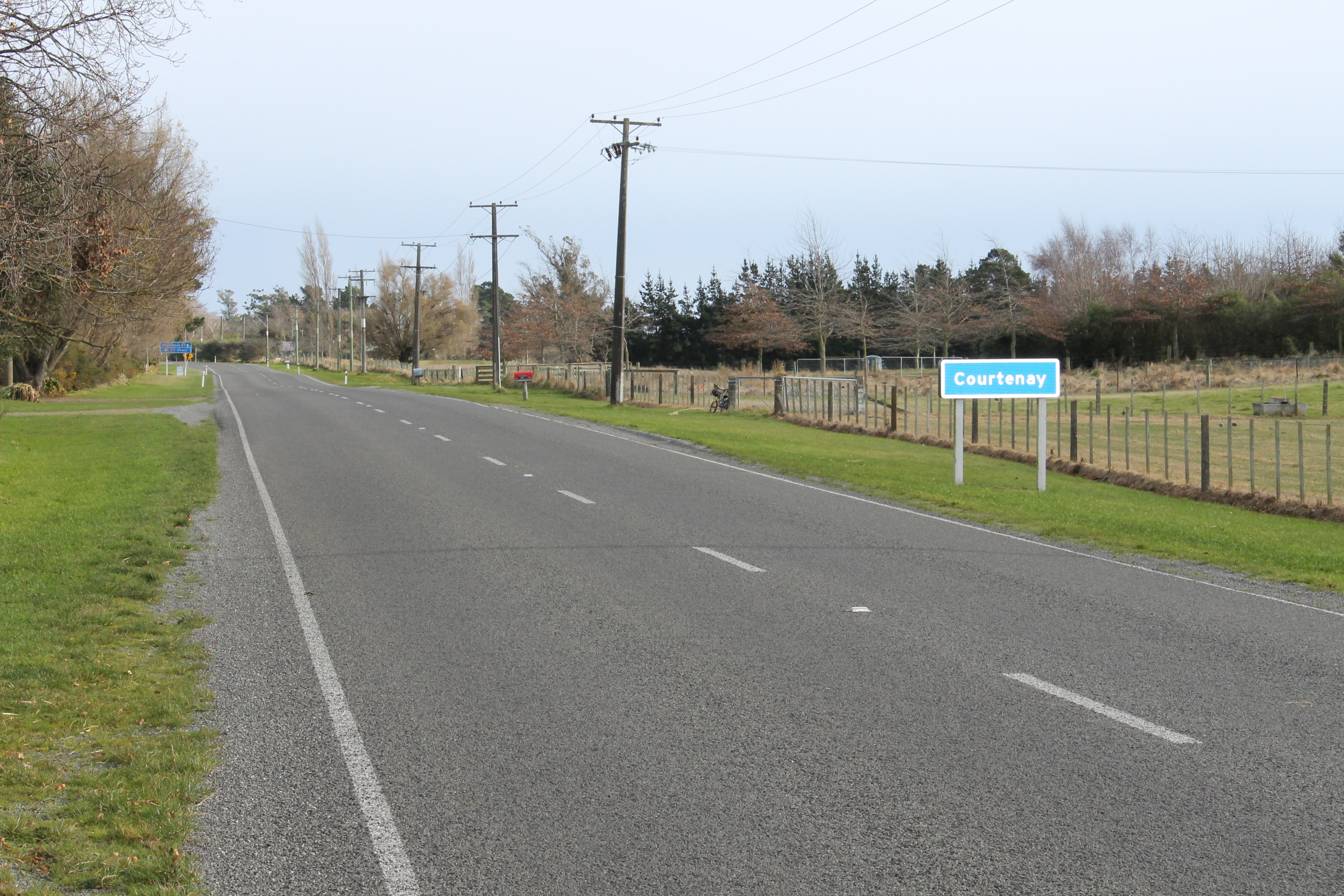
Courtenay, the township that gave the electorate its name

Courtenay was a parliamentary electorate in Canterbury, New Zealand from 1902 to 1908. The electorate was represented by one Member of Parliament, Charles Lewis.

== Population centres ==
The Representation Act 1900 had increased the membership of the House of Representatives from general electorates 70 to 76, and this was implemented through the 1902 electoral redistribution. In 1902, changes to the country quota affected the three-member electorates in the four main centres. The tolerance between electorates was increased to ±1,250 so that the Representation Commissions (since 1896, there had been separate commissions for the North and South Islands) could take greater account of communities of interest. These changes proved very disruptive to existing boundaries, and six electorates were established for the first time, including Courtenay, and two electorates that previously existed were re-established.

The Courtenay electorate was based on the Canterbury area of Kirwee and Courtenay. The settlement of Courtenay on the south bank of the Waimakariri River dates from the 1850s.

In the 1907 electoral redistribution, a major change that had to be allowed for was a reduction of the tolerance to ±750 to those electorates where the country quota applied. The North Island had once again a higher population growth than the South Island, and three seats were transferred from south to north. In the resulting boundary distribution, every existing electorate was affected, and some were abolished, including the Courtenay electorate. These changes took effect with the 1908 election.

== History ==
=== Members of Parliament ===
Courtenay was represented by one Member of Parliament:

Key

Conservative

Election	Winner
1902 election	Charles Lewis
1905 election	Charles Lewis
