= Lawrence Courtney Haines =

Lawrence Courtney Haines (or Courtney-Haines) (c.1920–1996) was an Australian ornithologist, oologist and taxidermist. He instigated and cofounded the Gould League's Bird Watchers' Club in New South Wales (a group which morphed into the NSW Field Ornithologists Club in 1970), serving as its Secretary 1966–1969, and as editor of its journal Birds 1967–1971. He also served as vice-president of the Royal Zoological Society of New South Wales. He was the only Australian member of the British Jourdain Society.

As well as several articles on birds he wrote the book A Cabinet of Reed Warblers. A monograph dealing with the acrocephaline warblers of the world, and embracing all known species and subspecies.
