= John Courtney (diarist) =

John Courtney (1734–1806) was an English diarist, lawyer and property owner. He attended Trinity College, Cambridge, where he received legal training. He inherited lands and properties in and around Beverley, Yorkshire, where he lived and served in the local militia. He kept diaries from 1759 to his death.

== Life and career ==
Courtney was born in Beverley. His father, also John (1679–1756), the son of a London stonemason, worked for the East India Company and became Governor of Surat. His mother was Elizabeth Bourdenand (née Featherstone), daughter of Thomas Featherstone of Beverley. His parents were married in 1732.

Courtney studied at Beverley Grammar School under the Revd John Clarke, who moved to Wakefield School in 1751, taking Courtney with him. The next year, Courtney was admitted as a pensioner at Trinity College, Cambridge, where he received legal training. His grandmother and other relatives left him land and rental property in Beverley and the surrounding area, and he returned there to live the life of a country gentleman. Courtney married Mary Smelt (born circa 1744–1805), daughter of William Smelt and Ursula (née Hankin). Mary was the sister-in-law of the botanist Sir Sir Thomas Frankland, 6th Baronet and Cornelius Smelt, a Lieutenant Governor of the Isle of Man. Courtney and Mary had three daughters and at least five sons: John (1769–1845) who became a priest, Ralph (b.1770 and died the same year), Cornelius (1773–1793), Henry (1774–1844), Thomas (1776–1818) and Septimus (1779–1843), Mary (1777–1787), Margaret Jesse (b. 1780) and Dorothy Anne (b. 1781).

== Diaries ==
Courtney began keeping diaries by 1759, which contain information about Beverley politics, buildings, sporting events, restaurants and other public accommodations and attractions. They relay gossip about all of the well-known local families. They also describe his activities at Cambridge, his management of his property and his children and family. He was an active member of the local militia and records his thoughts, in 1762 and 1763, about the Anglo-Spanish War, and later the French Revolution. In the 1790s, he notes his conversations with William Wilberforce and his thoughts on the slave trade and Thomas Paine's Rights of Man. After the turn of the century, he discusses Horatio Nelson and the Peace of Amiens.
