= Duncliffe Wood =

Woodland in Dorset, England

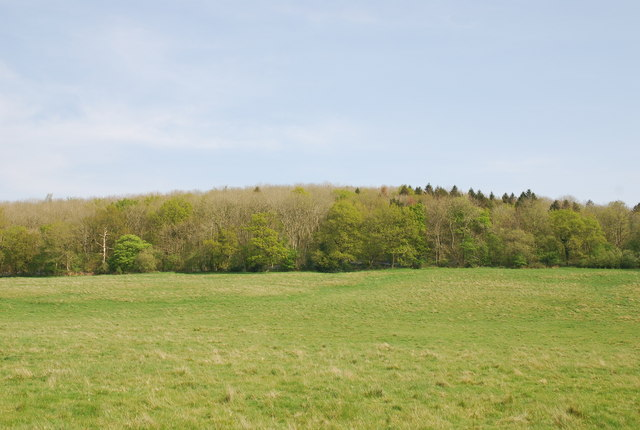
- A view towards Duncliffe Wood from the West

- Location within Dorset
- Interactive map of Duncliffe Wood

Geography
- Location: Dorset, England
- OS grid: ST825224
- Coordinates: 51.0016°N 2.2507°W
- Area: 92.16 hectares (227.7 acres)

Administration
- Authority: Woodland Trust

Duncliffe Wood is an ancient woodland on the summit of Duncliffe Hill, a few miles west of Shaftesbury. The area of the site is 92.16 hectares (227.7 acres), making it one of the largest ancient woodlands in North Dorset.

The woodland is mentioned in the Domesday Book of 1086, when it was owned by Roger de Belmont and valued at nine pounds. From there it passed into the possession of a French nunnery, until in 1414 it became a Crown property, from which it was then given to Eton College. Finally, it came into the ownership of King's College, Cambridge, in which it remained for 500 years. In 1984, the Woodland Trust—with the assistance of the Countryside Commission and local councils—acquired the site from the Forestry Commission as part of their offloading process. The woodland was traditionally coppiced until at least the 1930s, with a broad mix of native broadleaf trees—oak, ash, and hazel. During the 1960–70s, the woods were largely felled and replanted—predominantly with Norway spruce (Picea abies) and oak, with lesser amounts of Japanese larch (Larix kaempferi) and beech. The Woodland Trust has, since its acquisition of the site, been felling the conifers and replanting them with native broadleaves, or else leaving them as clearings to encourage wildlife. In addition, the trust is trying to protect the remains of the original ancient woodland; the lime trees (Tilia) in the wood are reputed to be some of the oldest living things in Dorset, estimated at between 600 and 1000 years old. Notable butterflies on the site are the silver-washed fritillary, white admiral and purple hairstreak.
