= Pamela Moore (author) =

American novelist

- Born: September 22, 1937
- Died: June 7, 1964 (aged 26); New York City, U.S.
- Education: Barnard College
- Occupation: Writer
- Known for: Chocolates for Breakfast

Pamela Moore (September 22, 1937 – June 7, 1964) was an American novelist best known for her debut novel Chocolates for Breakfast. She published her first novel, Chocolates for Breakfast, at age eighteen, which garnered her critical attention for its provocative themes involving its teenage protagonist.

== Early life ==
She was born on September 22, 1937, the daughter of Don and Isabel Moore, both writers. Her parents divorced in the mid-1940s, and her father relocated to Los Angeles, California, where he worked as a story editor for Warner Brothers and RKO Pictures; her mother took a job as an editor for Photoplay in New York City. Between schooling, Moore spent her childhood splitting her time between New York and Los Angeles. She was educated at Rosemary Hall and Barnard College.

== Career ==
Her first book, Chocolates for Breakfast, was published when she was 18 and became an international bestseller. At the time, it was often associated with Bonjour Tristesse, a novel published two years earlier in France by 18-year-old Françoise Sagan. Since its publication in 1956, Chocolates for Breakfast appeared in 11 languages, including French, Italian, Spanish, Hebrew, Swedish, and German. According to the Bantam paperback edition, the book went through 11 printings in the U.S. and sold over one million copies.

Chocolates for Breakfast gained notoriety for its frank depiction of sexuality at a time when 18-year-old girls were not expected to read about such topics, let alone write about them. The protagonist is a young girl named Courtney, coming of age as her parents divorce, splitting her time between two coasts. Her father is a member of the genteel New York publishing world, while her mother pursues a fading acting career in Hollywood. The book portrays a privileged and jaded set of characters who drink heavily and pride themselves on their sexual sophistication. After an unrequited crush on one of her boarding-school teachers leads to heartbreak, Courtney beds a bisexual Hollywood actor and a dissolute European aristocrat living out of a New York hotel. As Robert Clurman noted in The New York Times Book Review "...not very long ago, it would have been regarded as shocking to find girls in their teens reading the kind of books they're now writing." The book also includes discussion of homosexuality, alcoholism, gender roles and sexual exploration that was, for the era, uncommon.

Moore went on to write four more novels, including Pigeons of St. Mark's Place, The Exile of Suzy-Q, and The Horsy Set, but none of these enjoyed the success of the first.

Dan Visel speculates that this may be partially explained by the change in the tone of the later books: ". . . what stands out most about The Horsy Set is the unrelenting darkness it presents; in its depiction of depression, it prefigures The Bell Jar, which would be published the next year. Mud is never far from Brenda's mind; she sees herself sinking further into a despoiled adult world where nothing can save her."

Other reviewers have noted, in the depiction of depression and suicide in "Chocolates," and the frantic mood swings of Brenda in "The Horsy Set," intimations of a bipolar disorder, for which diagnosis and treatment were at the time nearly non-existent. In 1963 Moore gave birth to a son, Kevin. Nine months later, in 1964, working on her final, unpublished novel Kathy on the Rocks, she committed suicide by gunshot.

== Personal life ==
In 1958, Moore married Adam Kanarek, a lawyer of Polish-Jewish origin who had "very little in common with the residents of Beverly Hills, the Westchester horse set, and the habitues of '21' and the Stork Club."

== Death ==
On June 7, 1964, Moore's husband left to go to work, while she stayed home with their small child Kevin, while working on her next book, tentatively entitled Kathy. When he returned home from work, he found Moore dead on the floor next to her typewriter of a self-inflicted gunshot wound to the head.

== Legacy ==
Chocolates for Breakfast was republished in paperback and e-book editions in June 2013, with a new foreword by author Emma Straub.
