= Courtenay Place =

Courtenay Place may refer to:

== In New Zealand ==
- Courtenay Place, Rotorua, Rotorua
- Courtenay Place, Wellington, one of the main streets in Wellington

== In the United Kingdom ==
- Courtenay Place, London, a street in Waltham Forest, northeast London
- Courtenay Place, Teignmouth, the town centre of Teignmouth, Devon
