= Gwendoline Courtney =

English children's author (1911–1996)

- Born: 23 September 1911
- Died: March 1996 (aged 84–85)
- Occupation: novelist
- Genre: Children's literature, School stories

Gwendoline Courtney (23 September 1911 – March 1996) was an English writer of children's literature.

== Early life and education ==
Gwendoline Courtney was born in Hampshire in 1911. Her father was an antiques dealer. Courtney and her family moved to Wallasey when she was a child, and she was a pupil at Oldershaw High School. She had wanted to attend university to read history and classics, but ill-health prevented this.

== Career ==
Courtney's first children's novel, Torley Grange, was published by Nelson in 1935. She was 24 at this point and working in her father's office. Her last, The Wild Lorings, Detectives, was published by Hutchinson in 1956. She wrote 13 books in all. She did not publish in the last forty years of her life.

Courtney worked as a secretary for Arnold Goodman, Baron Goodman during World War II; she said that she had been the only civilian involved in Operation Overlord.

== Personal life ==
From 1941, Courtney lived in the south of England, in Dorset and in Cornwall. She lived with her sister for most of her life; at the time of her death in March 1996, aged 85, she was living at Stour Row near Shaftesbury in Dorset. She had an injury to her ear caused by a bomb blast in the war, which meant that she and her sister moved several times in search of quiet.

She was involved in amateur theatricals, in the sport of fencing, and with the Cornish Cat Society.

== Critical response ==
Her books were less popular from the 1960s. Sue Sims and Hilary Clare write in The Encyclopaedia of Girls' School Stories that "Courtney's books are well-written and gently humorous, and we are willing to suspend our disbelief at the sensational goings on at some of her establishments for the sake of the attractive characters she creates".

A Coronet for Cathie (1950) was described by Mabel Esther Allan as having "rather startling similarities" to Elsie J. Oxenham's The Girls of the Hamlet Club (1914). Allan asked Courtney about this, and Courtney said that she had not read The Girls of the Hamlet Club. Allan listed the parallels between the novels in two essays included in the collection Ragged Robin Began It. She wrote "I love A Coronet for Cathie now, in spite of its faults, and there are many ... written in a hurry, or poorly thought out ... It needed a lot more thought and depth".

At School with the Stanhopes (1951) has been described as Courtney's best book, "warm, funny". Those Verney Girls (originally 1948, republished 1956) was described by the New York Herald Tribune in 1957 as "a rather gentle and leisurely story", whilst Kirkus Reviews said of the same book, "Something happening all the time here, and with local characters thrown in, much of it is amusing".

The critic Elizabeth Poynter has written that Courtney's books were likely to have been read by girls more than by boys; Poynter notes both humour and danger in the books.

== Books ==
- Torley Grange (Nelson, 1935)
- The Grenville Garrison (Nelson, 1940), a Ruritanian novel
- The Denehurst Secret Service (Oxford University Press, illustrated by Margaret Horder, 1940)
- Well Done, Denehurst! (OUP, illus. Horder, 1941)
- Sally's Family (OUP, 1946, illus. Jennetta Vise)
- Stepmother (OUP, 1948; republished by Children's Press in 1965 as Elizabeth of the Garret Theatre, illus. TR Freeman); also published as Those Verney Girls (1956)
- A Coronet for Cathie (Nelson, 1950, illus. Edith Brier; republished by Girls Gone By Publishers in 2003)
- Long Barrow (OUP, 1950, illus. Richard Kennedy; also published as The Farm on the Downs); described as "a modern family book"
- At School with the Stanhopes (Nelson, 1951, illus. Valerie Sweet)
- The Girls of Friar's Rise (Nelson, 1952, illus. Edith Brier)
- The Chiltons (Nelson, 1952)
- The Wild Lorings at School (Hutchinson, 1954)
- The Wild Lorings, Detectives (Hutchinson, 1956)

A serial she wrote for the Salisbury Journal in 1953 was republished as a book by Girls Gone By in 2011.
