= Courtney Sheinmel =

American writer (born 1977)

- Born: 1977 (age 47–48) Stanford, California, USA
- Education: Barnard College (BA); Fordham School of Law (JD)

Website
- courtneysheinmel.com

Courtney Sheinmel (born 1977) is an American author of children's and young adult books.

Sheinmel was born June 21, 1977, in Stanford, California. She lived in the San Francisco Bay Area until age nine, at which point she moved to New York City with her mother and sister. She received a Bachelor of Arts in English from Barnard College in 1999, after which she received a J.D. degree from Fordham University School of Law.

Sheinmel worked as a lawyer for six years before publishing her first novel, My So-Called Family, in 2008, after which she began writing full-time. Her second novel, Positively (2009), centers a teenager living with HIV, inspired by Sheinmel's involvement with the Elizabeth Glaser Pediatric AIDS Foundation. She has since written 5 novels for older readers (ages 12-18) and 27 for younger readers (under age 12).

As of 2012, Sheinmel lived in New York City.

== Publications ==
=== Older readers ===
- My So-Called Family (2008)
- Positively (2009)
- Edgewater (2015)
- The Survival List (2019)
- The Secrets of Lovelace Academy (2025), cowritten with Marie Benedict

=== Younger readers ===
==== Agnes & Clarabelle books ====
The Agnes & Clarabelle books are co-authored with Adele Griffin and illustrated by Sara Palacios.

- Agnes & Clarabelle (2017)
- Agnes & Clarabelle Celebrate! (2017)

==== The Kindness Club books ====
- The Kindness Club: Chloe on the Bright Side (2016)
- The Kindness Club: Designed by Lucy (2017)

==== Magic on the Map books ====
The Magic on the Map books are co-authored with Biana Turetsky and illustrated by Stevie Lewis.

- Magic on the Map: Let's Mooove! (2019)
- Magic on the Map: The Show Must Go On
- Magic on the Map: Texas Treasure
- Magic on the Map: Escape from Camp California

==== My Pet Slime books ====
The My Pet Slime books are co-authored by Renée Kurilla.

- My Pet Slime
- My Pet Slime: Cosmo to the Rescue
- My Pet Slime: Saving Cosmo (2021)

==== Stella Batts books ====
The Stella Batts books are illustrated by Jennifer A. Bell.

- Stella Batts Needs a New Name (2012)
- Stella Batts: Hair Today, Gone Tomorrow ((2012)
- Stella Batts: Pardon Me (2012)
- Stella Batts: A Case of the Meanies (2012)
- Stella Batts: Who's in Charge? (2013)
- Stella Batts: Something Blue (2014)
- Stella Batts: None of Your Beeswax (2014)
- Stella Batts: Superstar (2015)
- Stella Batts: Scaredy Cat (2016)
- Stella Batts: Broken Birthday (2017)

==== Standalone books ====
- Sincerely (2010)
- All the Things You Are (2011)
- Helen Keller (2021), illustrated by Gillian Flint
- Sallie Bee Writes a Thank-You Note (2022), co-authored by Susan Verde, illustrated by Heather Ross

==== Zacktastic books ====
The Zacktastic books are illustrated by Jeff Crosby.

- Zacktastic (2015)
- Zacktastic Twinsanity
