= Courtney Boyd Myers =

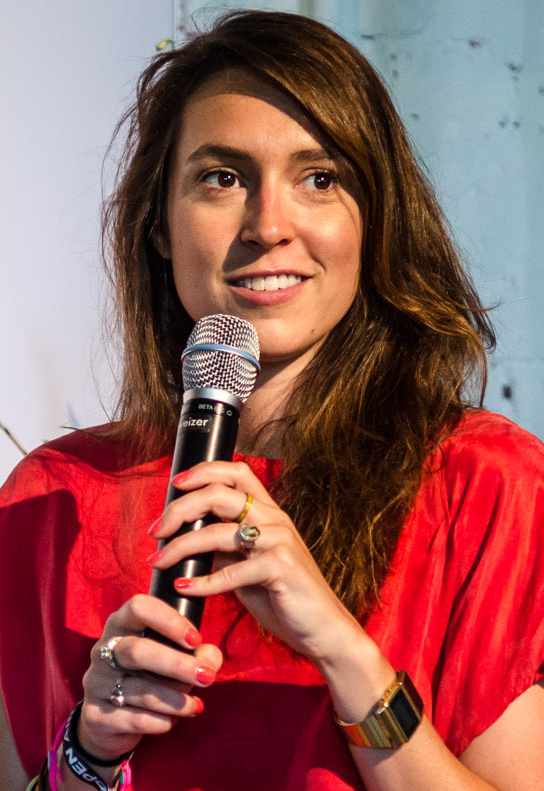
- Myers in 2013
- Born: Connecticut
- Known for: Founder of audience.io

Courtney Boyd Myers is an American entrepreneur and journalist. She is known for founding Audience.io, a consulting firm designed to create parity between tech start-ups in New York City and London. She was the co-founder and CEO of Akua, a sustainable food company that made plant-based products from kelp and mushrooms.

== Career ==
Myers was born in Connecticut. She worked for Forbes as a technology and opinions reporter from 2007 to 2009. She later worked as an editor of The Next Web, covering global technology trends and internet entrepreneurs. Myers created the 3460 miles newsletter, focussing on linking the New York City and London tech start-up scenes. Following this, in 2013 she launched the consulting firm Audience.io to help New York City and London-based technology start-ups grow internationally by providing strategy around media and content, business development, and product management. She is a member of 10 Downing and Tech City's advisory board and a mentor at Seedcamp, Ignite100, and BBCWorldWideLabs.

Myers was the co-founder and CEO of Akua, a company that made kelp-based meat alternatives. She established the company in 2017 with the aim of creating a more environmentally friendly option to conventional meat-based items. The company manufactured substitutes for burgers, jerky, and ground meat. Akua's first product kelp jerky was released in 2019 followed by kelp burgers in 2021. Their kelp burgers were sold in over 1,000 retail stores. Akua was shut down in August 2024 citing logistical challenges from the decline of plant-based meat in the United States.

== Personal life ==
Myers does not eat meat for ethical reasons and follows a "mostly plant-based" diet.
