= Duncliffe Hill =

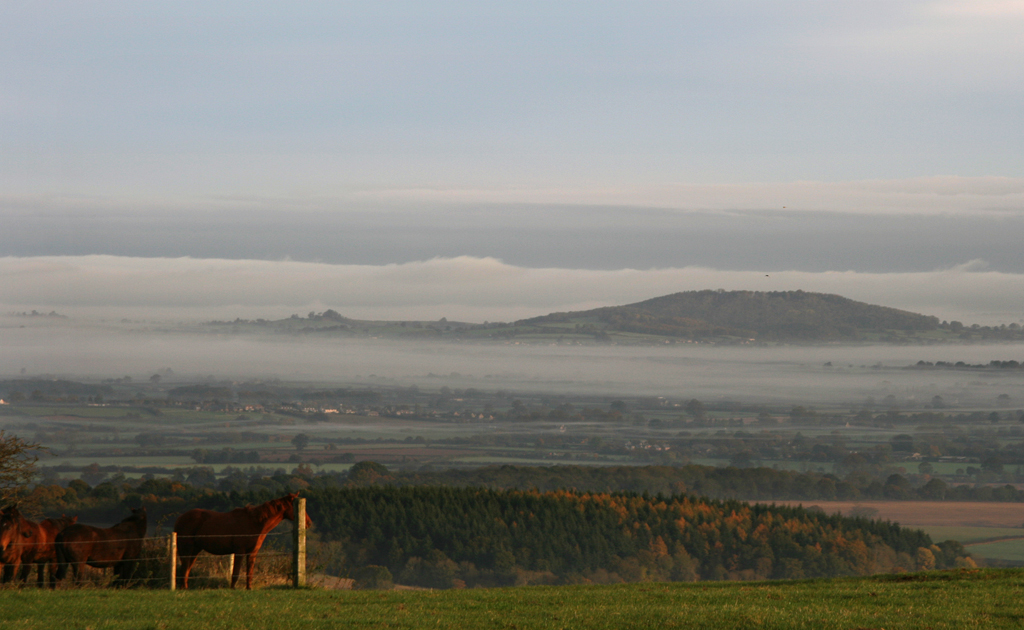
- Duncliffe Hill rising above the fog in the Blackmore Vale

Highest point
- Elevation: 210 m (690 ft)
- Prominence: 96 m (315 ft)
- Coordinates: 51°00′08″N 2°14′57″W

Geography
- Location: Blackmore Vale, Dorset, England
- Parent range: Isolated hill
- OS grid: ST826226
- Topo map: OS Landranger 183, Explorer 129

At 210 metres, Duncliffe Hill is one of the highest hills in the Blackmore Vale region in the county of Dorset, England.

== Description ==
Duncliffe Hill rises from the surrounding lowland about 2 miles west of Shaftesbury in the Blackmore Vale and is visible miles away in Wiltshire and Somerset. It is a gently conical hill with a double summit. The slopes are covered by Duncliffe Wood on three sides, but are open to the north. The woods are managed by the Woodland Trust. There are several trails through the woods, some leading to the summit where there is a trig point. The wood is a bird reserve. The A30 main road passes by the foot of the hill to the north.

== Geology ==
The geology of the hill is heavy Kimmeridge Clay, capped with a 5 to 6-metre thickness of Upper Greensand, a type of sandstone. The greensand has weathered to buff, shelly, glauconitic, fine-grained sand and weakly cemented sandstone. The hill is ringed by extensive Upper Greensand landslips, which earlier led geologists to assign a greater thickness of greensand to the hill. Many springs issue from the base of the greensand, particularly on the north side of the hill.

== Archaeology ==
An Iron Age bronze figurine of a boar was found on Duncliffe Hill.
