= Old Hall, Hornsea =

Building in Hornsea, East Riding of Yorkshire, England

Coordinates: 53°54′41″N 0°10′29″W

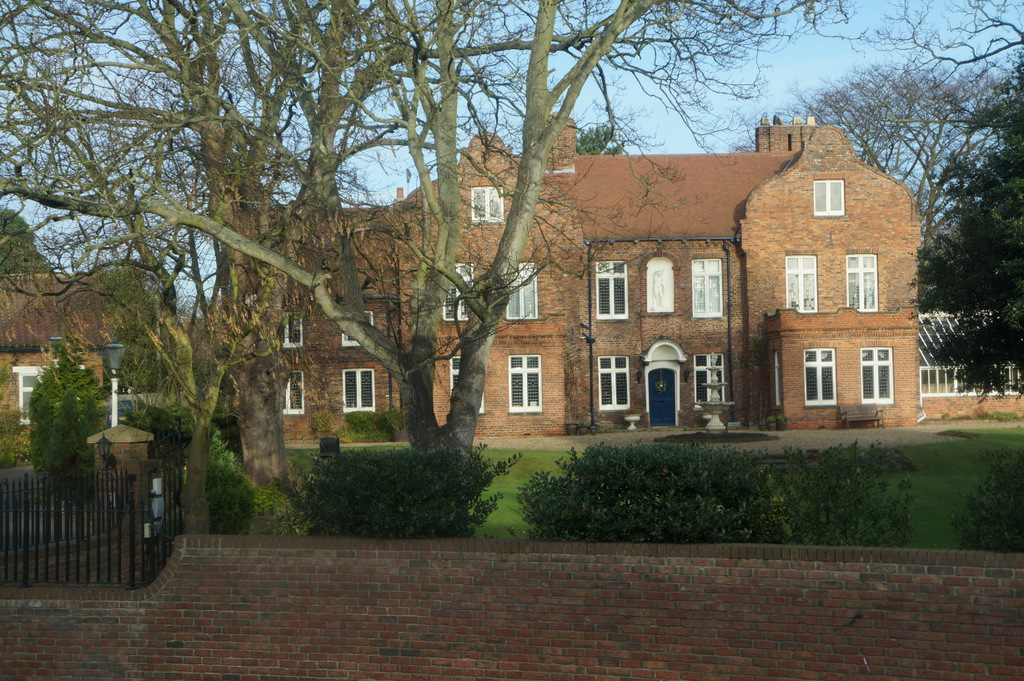
The house, in 2013

The Old Hall is a historic building in Hornsea, a town in the East Riding of Yorkshire, in England.

The house was built in the early 17th century, possibly as a rebuilding of the rectory of St Nicholas' Church, Hornsea. A west wing was constructed in the 18th century and bay windows at the front and a greenhouse in the 19th century. From 1910, it served as a school, and the virologist Tony Waterson was born at the property, which at the time was run by his parents. In 1940, it was requisitioned by the military and was used to house members of the Free French Army. From 1950 to 1954, it was the home of Hornsea Pottery. The building was grade II listed in 1965.

The house is built of red brick on cobble foundations, with a plinth, a tile roof, two storeys and attics. It consists of a central main range of three bays, flanking two-bay cross-wings with shaped gables, and a lower two-bay wing on the left with a differently shaped gable. In the centre of the main range is a doorway with an elliptical head, and a canopy on scrolled brackets with a heart motif. Most of the windows are cross-mullions with segmental gauged brick heads, and on the wing to the left are casements. Above the doorway is an elliptical-headed niche with imposts, a projecting keystone and an apron, containing a statue. Inside, the original hall fireplace survives as does some panelling, and various doors from around 1700.

== See also ==
- Listed buildings in Hornsea
