= RNAS Hornsea Mere =

Royal Naval Air Service base in the East Riding of Yorkshire, England

RNAS Hornsea Mere
- Hornsea, East Riding of Yorkshire in England
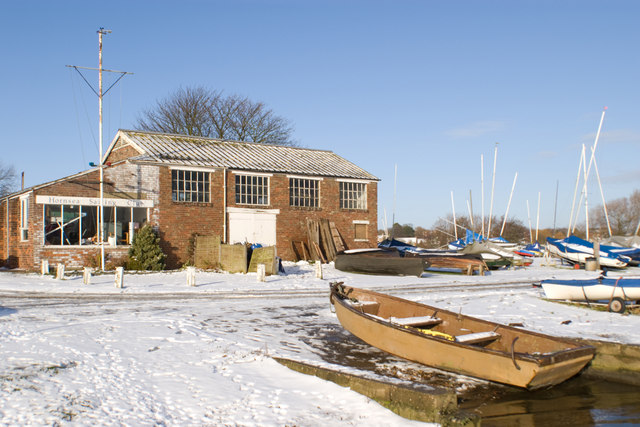
- Hornsea Sailing Club building; the old generator house

Site information
- Open to the public: Yes, as a boating yard

Location
- Coordinates: 53.907°N 0.177°W
- Grid reference: TA179472

Site history
- In use: 1915 – 1919

RNAS Hornsea Mere, (also known as RAF Hornsea Mere), was a Royal Naval Air Service seaplane base located on Hornsea Mere, in the East Riding of Yorkshire, England. The mere was used for seaplanes because it was close to the sea and because its still water made it easier to launch the planes. Initially used as a relief site, the base became a full station in 1918, and was vacated in 1919. Many of the original buildings and earthworks survive.

== History ==
A report submitted to the Air Ministry in 1915 detailed possible landing sites for aircraft along the Yorkshire coast, suggesting the use of racecourses and giving Beverley, Redcar and Scarborough as examples. The report also mentions the ideal scenario at Hornsea Mere, where the still water was perfect for launching seaplanes, and was only 1,500 yards (1,400 m) from the sea. The seaplane base was in use from early 1918 onwards, but the mere had been used as a seaplane landing site since July 1915. Hornsea Mere was operated as a sub-station of RNAS Killingholme in Lincolnshire until it became a full station in 1918. The seaplane station occupied a westward-facing peninsula into the mere from the eastern shore, covering 6 acres (2.4 ha), known as Kirkholme Nab. It was equipped with two Bessonneau hangars and other buildings, some tents and two slipways for launching the aircraft into the water. Some of the workshops were tearooms requisitioned from their proprietors Hull and Hornsea Railway line.

Previous to becoming a full station itself, aircraft operating from Hornsea Mere had to be manhandled into the water, with ground crew wearing rubberised suits for wading into the water. Throughout 1917, twelve Short 184 seaplanes were flown from Hornsea Mere, split between No. 404 and No. 405 flights. In the early months of 1918, many USAAS servicemen were rotated through RFC bases for flying experience, and the United States Naval Flying Corps (USNFC) did the same with their aircrew through RNAS bases. At least two USNFC pilots were based at Hornsea Mere, both ending up in crashes.

In April 1918 the Royal Naval Air Service and the Royal Flying Corps were merged into one service, the Royal Air Force. Although Hornsea Mere was not often labelled RAF Hornsea Mere, its new command structure was part of No. 18 Group. Additional training was taken on as the RNAS school at Redcar Aerodrome was closed to recruits, and some training was undertaken from Hornsea Mere. Later in the same year, the restructuring saw the base labelled as a Marine Operations (Seaplane) Station.

In May 1918, No. 251 Squadron was formed from 504, 505, 506 and 510 (Special Duty) Flights at Hornsea. The squadron was formed to fly coastal and anti-submarine patrols, so was headquartered at Killingholme, and only listed at Hornsea on paper, as the aircraft the squadron had were not seaplane variants, so flew from other bases such as Atwick and Owthorne. No.510 (SD) Flight was located at Redcar, then moved to West Ayton near to Scarborough. In August 1918, 404, 405 and 453 Flights were amalgamated into one unit, No. 248 Squadron at Hornsea Mere. This was command by No. 79 (Operations) Wing, which moved its HQ into Hornsea Mere in August 1918. The squadron was formed to provide anti-submarine patrols along the east coast, which it did until disbandment in March 1919.

With the formation of Squadrons at Hornsea Mere, it was expanded into a full base, no longer a sub-station of Killingholme, and it was finished with some more permanent buildings. However, the officers' mess was a requisitioned building in Hornsea town on Chambers Lane, quite close to the seaplane base, and most of the non-commissioned men who worked at the site were billeted in the town too. In a survey conducted by the RAF in 1918, the base was listed as having at least thirteen structures, two slipways and a compass rose. Personnel was listed as 141, including 28 officers, 9 above the rank of corporal, three corporals, 80 of "rank and file", and 21 women.

By December 1919, the government owned buildings on the mere were being advertised for sale.

== Post-military use ==
The main workshop, built in 1916, survives as the main building of the local sailing club. To the west of the remaining buildings and putting green is evidence of a compass rose, or compass platform. This was a circular device which allowed for the calibration of the aircraft's onboard compass in the days before GPS systems became available. The aircraft would be swung through 360 degrees and calibrated to true north.

Until its closure in 1998, RAF Cowden range was approached from the north west by pilots using the buildings on Hornsea Mere as a waymarking point to guide them in.

== Notable personnel ==
- Francis McClean, served as the commanding officer of No. 79 (Operations) Wing at Hornsea Mere (as a lieutenant-colonel)
