= Low Hall =

Low Hall is the name of:

- Low Hall, Bugthorpe in the East Riding of Yorkshire, in England
- Low Hall, Hornsea in the East Riding of Yorkshire, in England
- Low Hall Pumping Station in Walthamstow, in London
