= Hornsea Cross =

Wayside cross in Hornsea, East Riding of Yorkshire, England

Coordinates: 53°54′29″N 0°10′19″W

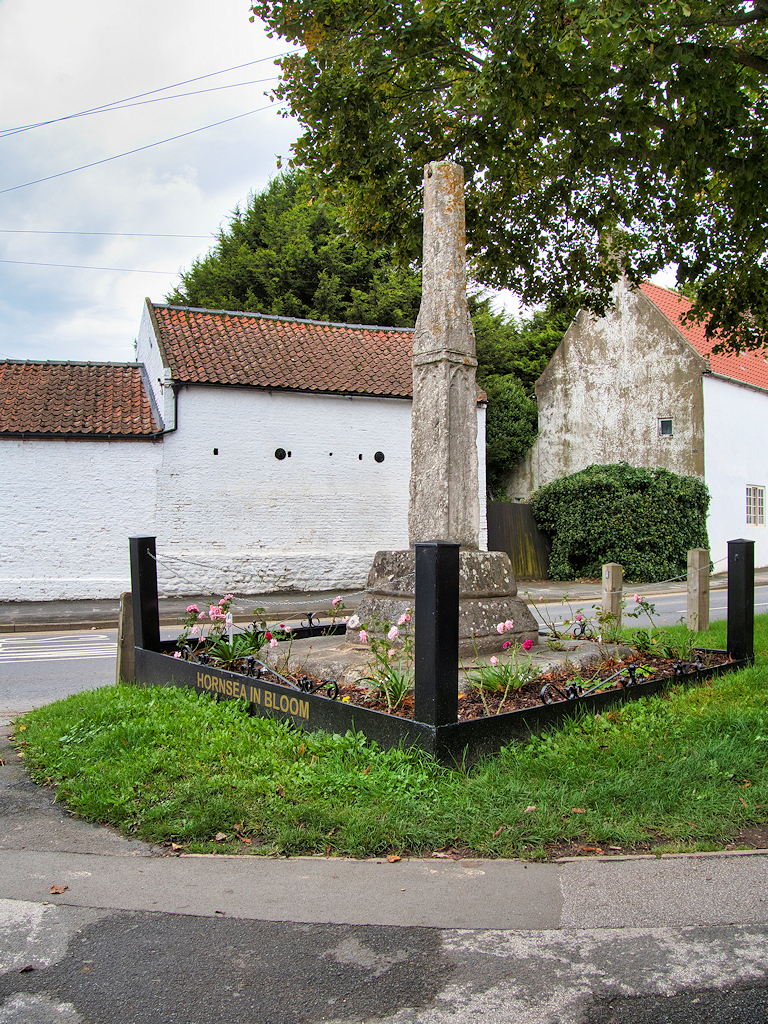
The structure, in 2023

The Hornsea Cross is a historic structure in Hornsea, a town in the East Riding of Yorkshire, in England.

The wayside cross was erected by Southgate, probably in the 14th century. Nikolaus Pevsner claims that the shaft of the cross is later, but Historic England describe it as original, and the Victoria County History describes a different cross, now in the churchyard of St Nicholas' Church, Hornsea, as having had its shaft replaced. The cross head is missing. The structure was grade II listed in 1985.

The cross is carved from white limestone and has a stepped and chamfered base. On it stands a shaft, the lower portion four-sided with trefoiled blank panels, and the upper portion tapering and eight-sided, with broach stops.

== See also ==
- Listed buildings in Hornsea
