= Listed buildings in Hornsea =

Hornsea is a civil parish in the county of the East Riding of Yorkshire, England. It contains 25 listed buildings that are recorded in the National Heritage List for England. Of these, one is listed at Grade I, the highest of the three grades, one is at Grade II*, the middle grade, and the others are at Grade II, the lowest grade. The parish contains the town of Hornsea and the surrounding area. Most of the listed buildings are houses, cottages and associated structures. The others include two churches, two crosses, a shop, a public house, a group of grave markers, a cobble wall and pump, a folly and a former railway station.

== Key ==
Grade	Criteria
I	Buildings of exceptional interest, sometimes considered to be internationally important
II*	Particularly important buildings of more than special interest
II	Buildings of national importance and special interest

== Buildings ==
Name and location	Photograph	Date	Notes	Grade
St Nicholas' Church; 53.91102°N 0.17317°W		13th century	The church has been altered and extended through the centuries, including a restoration in 1865–67 by George Gilbert Scott, and later alterations between 1899 and 1907. The church is built in cobbles with freestone dressings, and consists of a nave with a clerestory, north and south aisles, a south porch, a chancel with north and south aisled chapels, beneath which is a crypt, and a west tower embraced by the aisles. The tower has three stages, a chamfered plinth, angle buttresses, a pointed chamfered west doorway with a hood mould and a five-light window with Perpendicular tracery. Above are chamfered string courses, clock faces, pointed openings with Y-tracery and hood moulds, and an embattled parapet with eight crocketed pinnacles.	I
Wayside Cross; 53.90805°N 0.17183°W		14th century (probable)	The cross is in white limestone and has a stepped and chamfered base. On it stands a shaft, the lower portion four-sided with trefoiled blank panels, and the upper portion tapering and eight-sided, with broach stops.	II
Churchyard cross 53.91073°N 0.17364°W		Medieval	The cross, which stands in a corner of the churchyard of St Nicholas' Church, previously stood in the Market Place. It is in white limestone, and has a three-stepped plinth on a base with chamfered corners. On this is a tapering shaft with a moulded base, is surmounted by a 20th-century cross finial.	II
Burns Farm, later Hornsea Museum; 53.9110°N 0.17158°W		Late 16th century	A house that was largely rebuilt in the late 18th century, and later used as a museum, it is in brick on cobble foundations, colourwashed on the front, with a dentiled brick eaves cornice, and a pantile roof with raised gables. There are two storeys and attics, and two bays. On the front is a doorway, above which is a blind oculus. The windows on the ground floor are horizontally sliding sashes, and the upper floor has casement windows.	II
The Old Hall; 53.91151°N 0.17471°W		Early 17th century	The house is in red brick on cobble foundations, with a plinth, a tile roof, two storeys and attics. It consists of a central main range of three bays, flanking two-bay cross-wings with shaped gables, and a lower two-bay wing on the left with a differently shaped gable. In the centre of the main range is a doorway with an elliptical head, and a canopy on scrolled brackets with a heart motif. Most of the windows are cross-mullions with segmental gauged brick heads, and on the wing to the left are casements. Above the doorway is an elliptical-headed niche with imposts, a projecting keystone and an apron, containing a statue.	II
The White House; 53.90827°N 0.17205°W		1674	The house is in rendered and colorwashed brick and cobbles, on a high chamfered plinth, with a moulded floor band, a stepped brick eaves cornice, and a pantile roof with raised gables. There are two storeys, attics and cellars, four bays, and an extension to the left. The doorway has a fanlight and a segmental head. The windows on the front are sashes, one horizontally sliding, at the rear is a mullioned window, and there is a gabled roof dormer with a horizontally sliding sash window. The interior has retained some original features.	II*
2 Market Place; 53.91072°N 0.17385°W		Late 17th to early 18th century	A shop on a corner site in brick, with a stepped eaves cornice, and a double-span pantile roof with raised coped gables. There are two storeys and attics, and a front of four bays. On the ground floor are 20th-century shopfronts, and the upper floor contains sash windows and a blocked opening. On the right gable is a sash window with a wedge lintel and a projecting keystone.	II
65 and 66 Southgate; 53.91011°N 0.17325°W		Late 17th to early 18th century	A house, later divided into two, in cobble and some brick, rendered and colourwashed on the front and sides, with a pantile roof and raised coped gables. There are two storeys and three bays. On the front is a doorway with pilasters, impost blocks with ellipses, a divided rectangular fanlight, and a projecting cornice, and to its left is a bow window. To the right is a plainer doorway with pilasters, flanked by smaller bow windows. The upper floor contains tripartite horizontally sliding sashes.	II
Group of grave markers 53.90834°N 0.17224°W	—	Late 17th to early 18th century	The group of seven grave markers are in the garden to the west of White House, and are to members of the Acklam (or Acklome) family, Quakers who lived in the house. The legible dates range from 1667 to 1744.	II
32 Westgate; 53.91082°N 0.17892°W		Early 18th century	The house is in red brick, colourwashed on the front, with a dentilled brick eaves cornice, and a double-span pantile roof with tumbled-in brick to the raised gables. There are two storeys, a front of three bays, and a later parallel rear range. The central doorway has pilasters, a divided rectangular fanlight and a bracketed cornice, and to its right is a double sash window. These are flanked by canted bay windows, and on the upper floor are sash windows with louvred shutters.	II
3 Eastgate; 53.91235°N 0.17546°W		18th century	The house is in cobbles and some brick, and has a pantile roof with tumbled-in brick to the gables. There is one storey and attics, and three bays. On the front is a doorway with a gabled porch, and three 20th-century windows with segmental heads. The attic has three sloped roof dormers with horizontally sliding sash windows.	II
26 Newbegin; 53.91079°N 0.17208°W		18th century	A cottage, later used for other purposes, at one time Ye Old Cottage Café. It is in pebbledashed and colourwashed brick, with a pantile roof and raised gables. There is one storey and attics, and two bays. On the front are a doorway to the right, and two sash windows.	II
20 Westgate; 53.91115°N 0.17724°W		Mid-18th century	The house is in rendered and colourwashed brick, and has a pantile roof with raised gables and rounded apices. There is one storey and attics, two bays, and a continuous rear outshut. The doorway is in the centre, it is flanked by horizontally sliding sash windows, and there are two gabled roof dormers with casement windows.	II
Stable block, The White House; 53.90809°N 0.17207°W	—	18th century	The stable block is in colourwashed red brick on cobble foundations, with a stepped brick eaves cornice, and a pantile roof with tumbled-in brick to the raised gables and brick kneelers. There are two storeys and three bays. In the centre of each floor is a doorway, flanked by windows on the ground floor and blind openings on the upper floor; all the openings have segmental heads. On the left gable is an oculus.	II
Corner Cottage and Sunset Cottage; 53.91100°N 0.17575°W		Before 1761	A pair of cottages on a corner site, in cobbles, with sprocketed eaves, and a pantile roof with tumbled-in brick to the raised gables. Thee is a single storey and attics, and three bays. On the front is a doorway, a horizontally sliding sash window to its left and a 20th-century window to the right, and above are sloped roof dormers. In the north wall is a single cruck blade.	II
3 Southgate; 53.91027°N 0.17319°W		Late 18th century	The house is in brown brick, and has a Roman tile roof with a raised coped gable on the left, and a hipped roof on the right. There are two storeys and attics, and four bays. On the second bay is a doorway with fluted Doric pilasters and impost blocks, a fanlight in a panelled soffit and reveals, and an open pediment with mutules. To the right is a 20th-century shopfront. The windows are sashes with cambered channelled wedge lintels and projecting keystones. On the roof is a 20th-century dormer.	II
Cobble wall, pump and donkey turn 53.91284°N 0.17528°W	—	Late 18th to early 19th century	The cobble wall extends for about 17.5 metres (57 ft) and has been raised by the addition of brick. Against the wall are a hand water pump and a stone horse trough. Beyond this is a donkey-driven water pump forming a pump turn, a semicircular recess in the wall.	II
The Nook; 53.90942°N 0.17253°W	—	Late 18th to early 19th century	The house is in orange brick, and has a pantile roof with raised coped gables. There are two storeys and two bays. The round-headed doorway in the right bay has a semicircular fanlight with radial glazing, and the windows are sashes with wedge lintels.	II
Mushroom Cottage; 53.90391°N 0.20898°W		1812	The cottage is roughcast, with a timber frame at the front, a conical tile roof and a circular plan. The front is recessed with timber supports, and contains two doorways and two nine-pane windows with shutters, all the openings with pointed heads. On the roof are dormers with casement windows.	II
Former Pike and Heron Public House; 53.91064°N 0.17420°W		c. 1830	The public house, later called the New Inn, is in rendered brick, the ground floor rusticated, with rusticated rock-faced quoins to the upper floors, a floor band, and a slate roof with close verges to the gables on kneelers. There are three storeys and three bays. The doorway has Doric pilasters and a cornice. The windows are sashes with wedge lintels, those on the lower two floors with vermiculated keystones, and on the top floor with rock-faced keystones.	II
Vicarage and wing walls 53.91127°N 0.17200°W		1831	The vicarage is in whitewashed brick, with deep oversailing eaves on paired brackets, and a hipped slate roof. There are two storeys and three bays, the middle bay slightly recessed. In the centre is a porch, above which is a casement window. The other windows are sashes under slightly segmental gauged brick arches. Flanking the house are wing walls with ramped coping, the left containing a round-arched opening, and the right with double doors.	II
Folly; 53.91029°N 0.17036°W		1844	The folly, also known as Bettinson's Tower, is in rusticated over-fired brick wasters. It consists of a circular tower with five stages separated by projecting brick string courses, with a stepped brick cornice and an embattled parapet. The ground floor contains a doorway and a blocked window with pointed heads. Above are lancet windows, a pointed window, an oculus, and bottle bases forming patterns.	II
Railway station 53.91109°N 0.16395°W		1864	The railway station was designed by Rawlins Gould for the Hull and Hornsea Railway, it closed in 1964, and has been converted for residential use. It is in red brick with sandstone dressings, a moulded cornice, and a hipped slate roof. There is a single storey , a front of 15 bays, and a five-bay extension to the left. The middle five bays project and form a loggia on a chamfered plinth with rusticated quoins. There are five round-headed arches with moulded bases and imposts, projecting keystones, and roundels in the spandrels. The middle opening has rusticated pilasters and a pediment. The flanking windows have round-headed arches, keystones and roundels in the spandrels.	II
United Reformed Church; 53.91244°N 0.16654°W		1868	The church is in light brown brick, with dressings in red brick, and a slate roof with ridge cresting. It consists of a nave and a chancel in one unit, a west porch, shallow north and west transepts, and a southwest steeple. The steeple has a tower with three stages, and a south door with a shouldered lintel in a pointed opening. Above are paired lancet windows, paired bell openings, clock faces under gablets, and a broach spire with a moulded band and a foliated finial.	II
Farrago and washhouse 53.90998°N 0.16594°W		1906–08	The house has a steel frame, concrete floors, walls of ornamental and pictorial brick and tiles, and a slate roof. There are three storeys, two bays, a bathroom and gazebo on the front, and a rear wing. The right bay is gabled and contains a canted bay window, and an open gabled timber porch. The middle floor has sash window with shouldered lintels and vermiculated keystones. The gazebo has a large window under swept moulded coping and on the right return is a cornice with a Lombard frieze. To the right is a washhouse in similar style.	II
