= Hornsea Mere =

Freshwater lake in the East Riding of Yorkshire, England

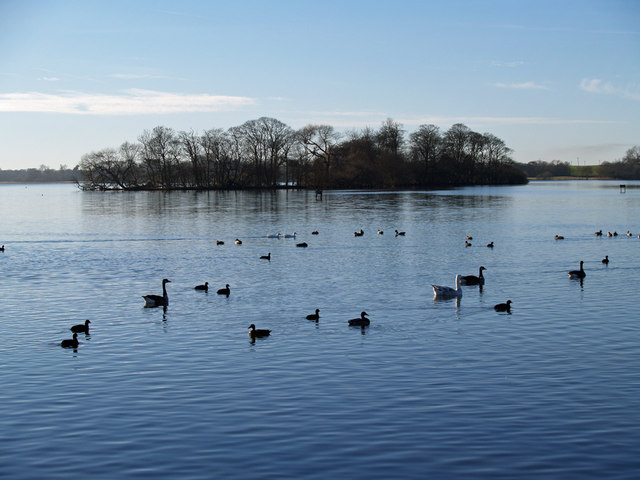
- Swan Island, Hornsea Mere

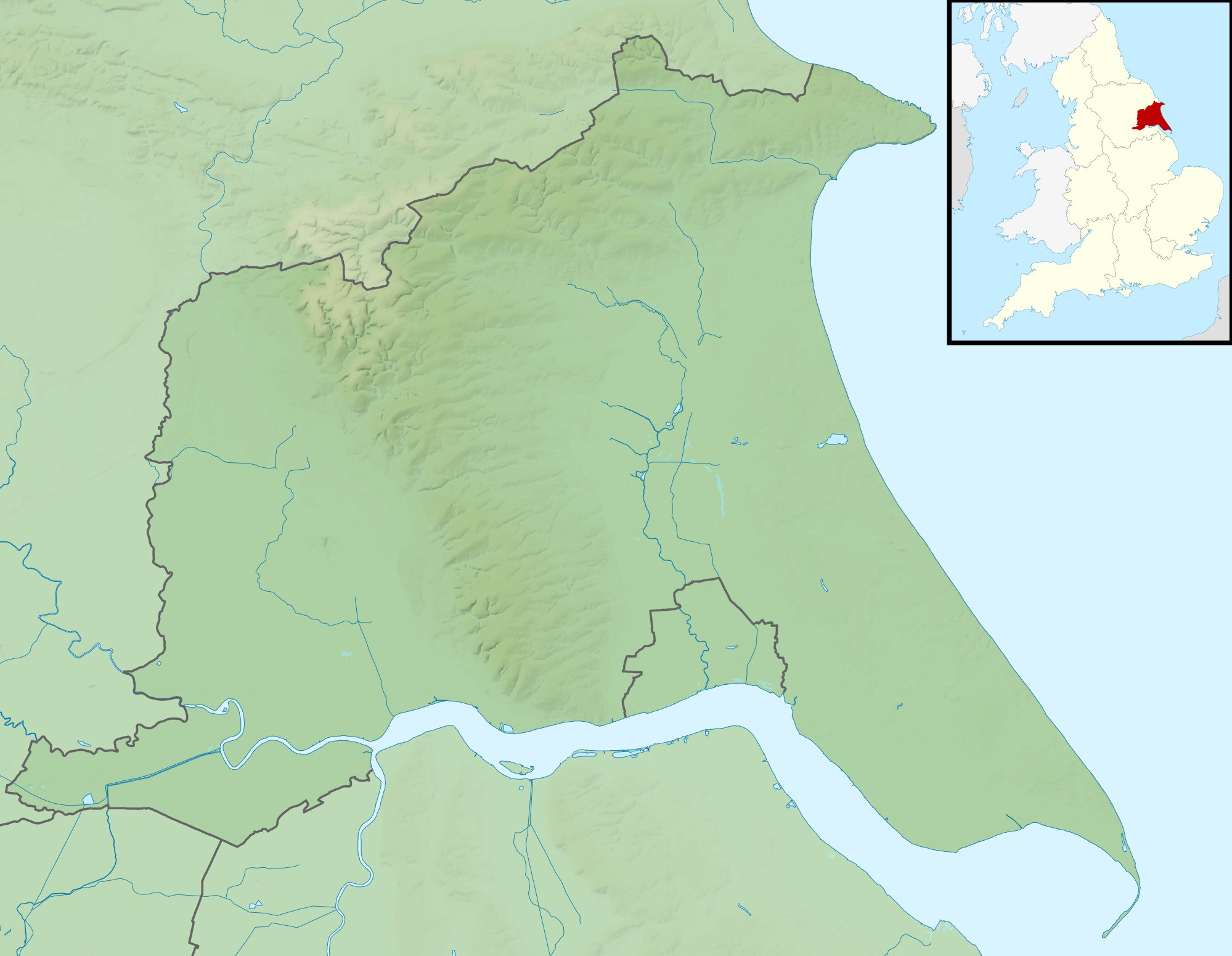
- Location within East Riding of Yorkshire
- Location: Southgate, Hornsea, East Riding of Yorkshire
- Coordinates: 53°54′20″N 0°11′10″W
- Basin countries: United Kingdom
- Max. length: 2 miles (3.2 km)
- Max. width: 0.75 miles (1.2 km)
- Surface area: 467 acres (1.89 km^{2})
- Max. depth: 12 feet (3.7 m)
- Surface elevation: 26 feet (8 m)

Hornsea Mere is the largest freshwater lake in Yorkshire, England, and lies to the west of Hornsea in the East Riding of Yorkshire. The mere was used as a base for the Royal Naval Air Service, and then later the Royal Air Force, during the First World War.

== Description ==
It covers an area of 467 acres (1.89 km^{2}), is 2 miles (3.2 km) long, 0.75 miles (1.2 km) at its widest point and 12 feet (3.7 m) at its deepest. The average depth of the lake is 4 feet 11 inches (1.5 m) and the mere itself lies only 26 feet (8 m) above sea level. The mere is fed by several small streams and a sluice gate at the eastern end of the mere controls the outflow, which travels only 0.68 miles (1.1 km) eastwards to the North Sea.

Hornsea Mere is a centre for bird-watching and a tourist attraction offering rowing, sailing, boat trips and fishing. It is a designated Site of Special Scientific Interest and a Special Protection Area for birds; it accommodates many species throughout the year, and is of international importance for a migratory population of gadwall. Its shallowness results in a diverse range of swamp and fen plants.

It was featured in the BBC television programme Seven Natural Wonders.

Hornsea Mere is owned by Wassand Hall, situated to the west of the mere, and was purchased by the Hall's estate for £50 in the 16th century.

The mere is the base for Hornsea Sailing Club.

== RNAS Hornsea Mere ==
A Royal Naval Air Service seaplane base was opened on the mere in September 1917. Initially, numbers 248 and 251 squadrons operated from RNAS Hornsea Mere with a headquarters at Killingholme. No. 251 Squadron operated non-water based aircraft so did not actually fly from Hornsea despite being based there.

The RNAS base was located on Kirkholme Nab, a small 6-acre (2.4 ha) peninsula that sticks out westwards from the eastern shore. The RNAS installed two Bessonneau hangars and two slipways from Kirkholme Nab which allowed a dozen seaplanes to be operated from the base. Various flights flew from here in coastal protection and submarine attack operations. These flights were eventually grouped together to form No. 248 Squadron who were commanded by No. 79 (Operations) Wing (who also commanded No. 251 Squadron, hence their allocation at Hornsea Mere).

A number of brick buildings left behind by the RAF in 1919 are still in use today, employed by the boatyard and the cafe which operate there. Despite being vacated by the RAF, the mere and the former RNAS buildings were used as a starting point for aerial practice runs on the bombing range at RAF Cowden on the East Yorkshire coast.
