= Farrago, Hornsea =

Building in Hornsea, East Riding of Yorkshire, England

Coordinates: 53°54′36″N 0°09′57″W

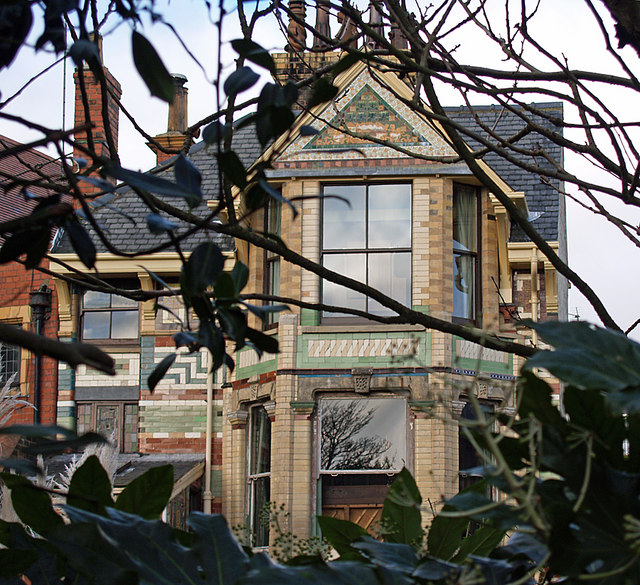
The building, in 2007

Farrago is a historic building in Hornsea, a town in the East Riding of Yorkshire, in England.

The house, at 6 Wilson Road, was constructed by David Reynard Robinson, a builder from Kingston upon Hull, between 1908 and 1909. Robinson built it as his own retirement home. He was enthusiastic about tiling, and so covered almost all the surfaces of the house, inside and out, with tiles, varying the patterns and using a wide variety of types of tile. His son-in-law lived next door and was unenthusiastic about the design, constructed a high wall to separate the properties. The house was grade II listed in 1985.

The house has a steel frame, concrete floors, walls of ornamental and pictorial brick and tiles, and a slate roof. There are three storeys, two bays, a bathroom and gazebo on the front, and a rear wing. The right bay is gabled and contains a canted bay window, and an open gabled timber porch. The middle floor has sash window with shouldered lintels and vermiculated keystones. The gazebo has a large window under swept moulded coping and on the right return is a cornice with a Lombard frieze. To the right is a washhouse in similar style. Inside, the octagonal first-floor drawing room has an 18th-century fireplace moved from elsewhere and there is a spiral staircase between the first and second floors.

== See also ==
- Listed buildings in Hornsea
