= Sacred Heart Church, Hornsea =

Church in the East Riding of Yorkshire, England

Coordinates: 53°54′30″N 0°10′18″W

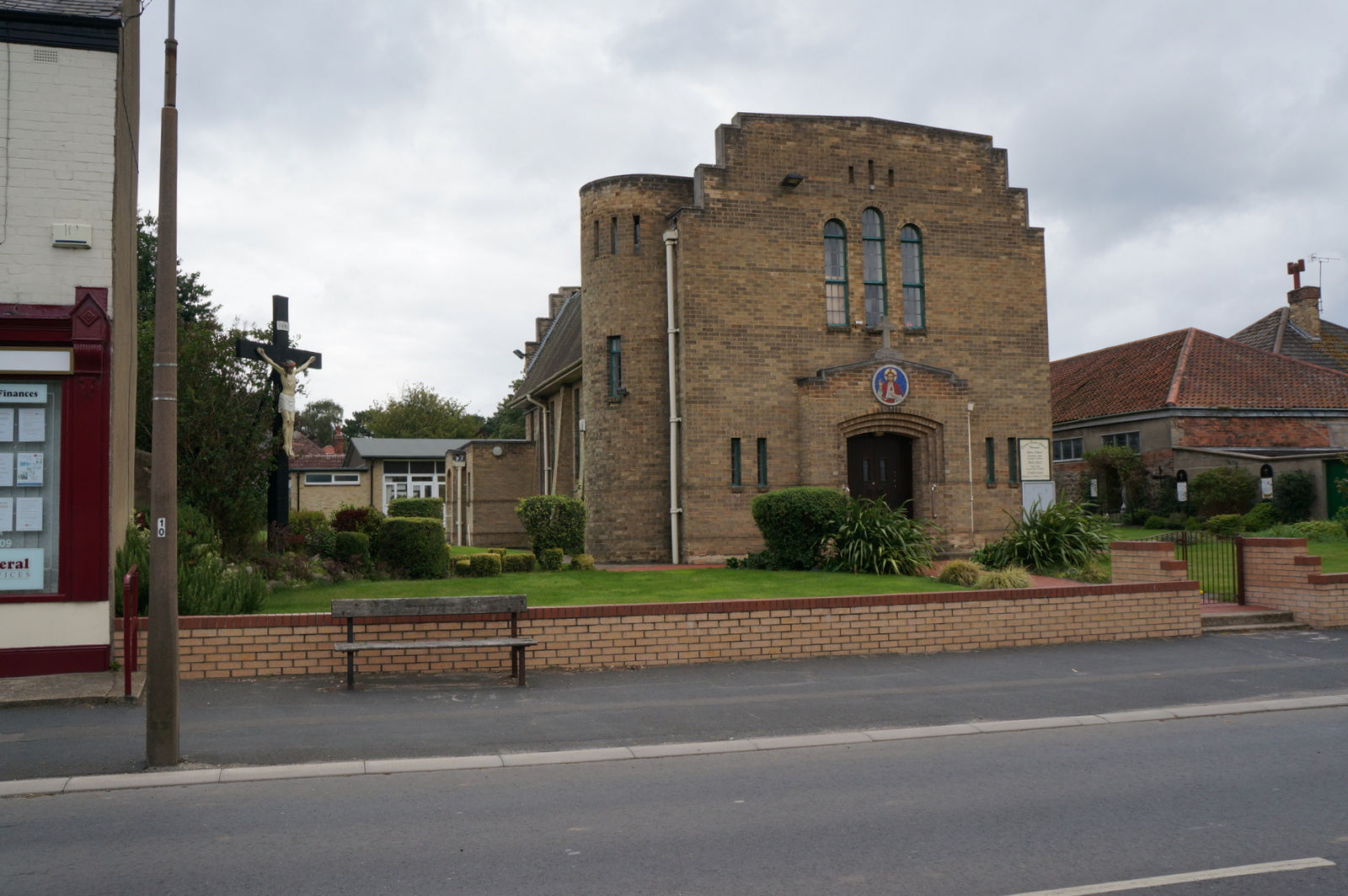
The church, in 2014

Sacred Heart Church is a Catholic church in Hornsea, a town in the East Riding of Yorkshire, in England.

The first Catholic church in Hornsea was built in 1928, a wooden structure. In 1956 it was demolished and a permanent replacement constructed, to a design by George I. Williams. In 1962, a church hall was constructed behind the building.

The church is built of yellow brick with a canted tiled roof. It consists of a nave and chancel, porch, south chapel and north sacristry. Above the porch is a mosaic roundel depicting Christ and the Sacred Heart. It is flanked by slit windows, and there are three round-headed windows above. The sides of the nave have paired windows and slanted buttresses, while the end wall of the chancel is rounded and has four shorter windows. There is a staircase projecting from the northwest corner of the nave. Inside, there is a west gallery over an internal porch, confessionals, and a baptistery containing an octagonal marble font. The chancel has a semi-circular arch, a large mosaic reredos, and a marble altar and communion rails.
