= Low Hall, Hornsea =

Building in Hornsea, East Riding of Yorkshire, England

Coordinates: 53°54′30″N 0°10′19″W

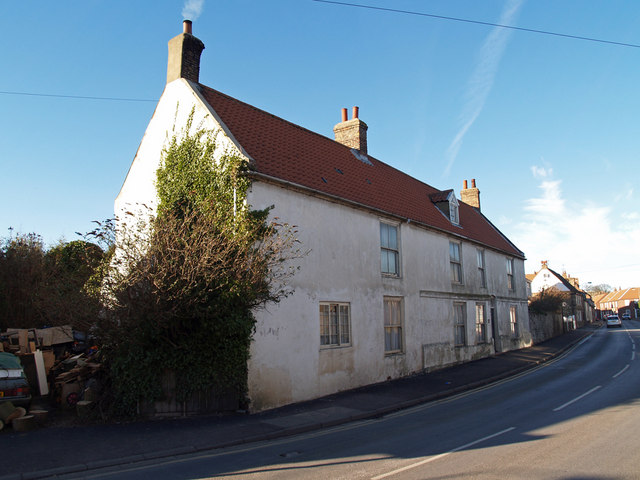
The church, in 2007

Low Hall is a historic building in Hornsea, a town in the East Riding of Yorkshire, in England.

The house was built by Peter Acklam around 1674. It was extended in the 18th century and became an inn named the "Old Hotel". When the inn closed, it was converted back into a private house, named "White House", before becoming Low Hall once more. The building was grade II* listed in 1985.

The house is built of rendered and colorwashed brick and cobbles, on a high chamfered plinth, with a moulded floor band, a stepped brick eaves cornice, and a pantile roof with raised gables. It has two storeys, attics and cellars and is four bays wide, with an extension to the left. The doorway has a fanlight and a segmental head. The windows on the front are sashes, one horizontally sliding, at the rear is a mullioned window, and there is a gabled roof dormer with a horizontally sliding sash window. The interior has retained extensive original woodwork including the staircase, doors, and cupboards. One first floor fireplace has a painting above depicting Noah and the Ark.

== See also ==
- Grade II* listed buildings in the East Riding of Yorkshire
- Listed buildings in Hornsea
