= Hornsea United Reformed Church =

Church in Hornsea, East Riding of Yorkshire, England

Coordinates: 53°54′45″N 0°09′59″W

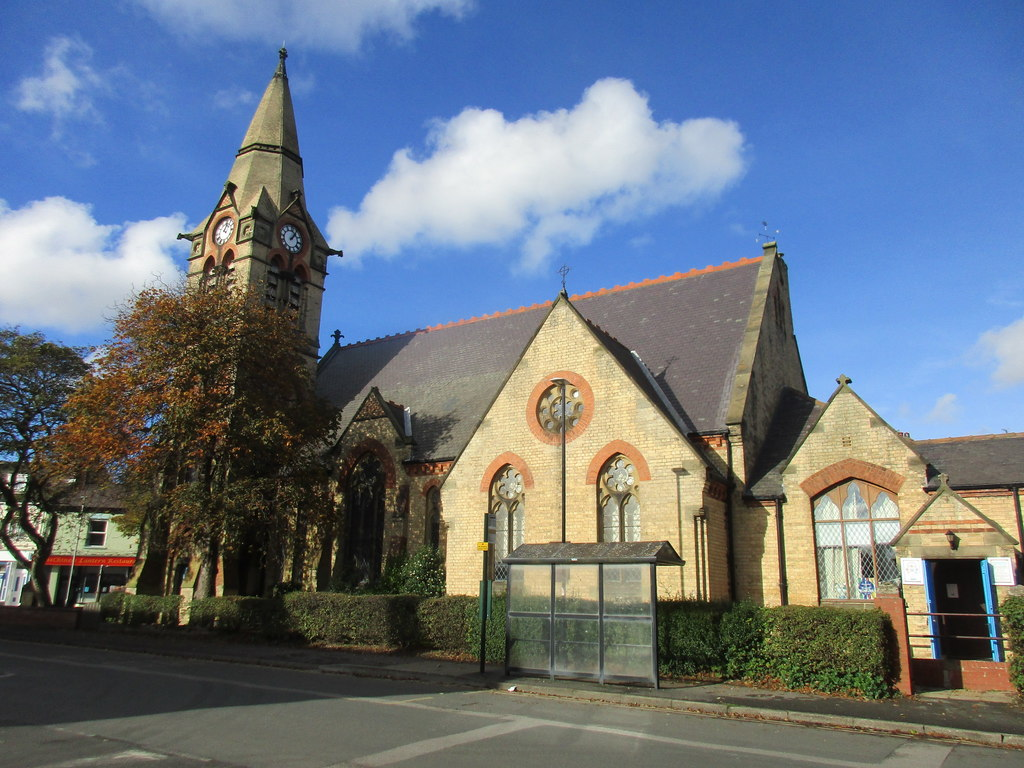
The church, in 2017

Hornsea United Reformed Church is a church in Hornsea, a town in the East Riding of Yorkshire, in England.

Fish Street Chapel in Kingston-upon-Hull led missionary visits to Hornsea from around 1800. A congregation grew, and the independent Protestant Bethesda Capel was built on Southgate in 1808. The chapel joined the Congregational Union of England and Wales. In 1868, a new church was built on Cliff Road, to a design by Samuel Musgrave. It was badly damaged by fire in 1968 and was then restored and remodelled. The congregation became part of the United Reformed Church in 1972. The building was grade II listed in 1985.

The church is built of light brown brick, with dressings in red brick, and a slate roof with ridge cresting. It consists of a nave and a chancel in one unit, a west porch, shallow north and west transepts, and a southwest steeple. The steeple has a tower with three stages, and a south door with a shouldered lintel in a pointed opening. Above are paired lancet windows, paired bell openings, clock faces under gablets, and a broach spire with a moulded band and a foliated finial. Inside, there is a west gallery which has been blocked off.

== See also ==
- Grade I listed buildings in the East Riding of Yorkshire
- Listed buildings in Hornsea
