= Hornsea Town Hall =

Municipal building in Hornsea, East Riding of Yorkshire, England

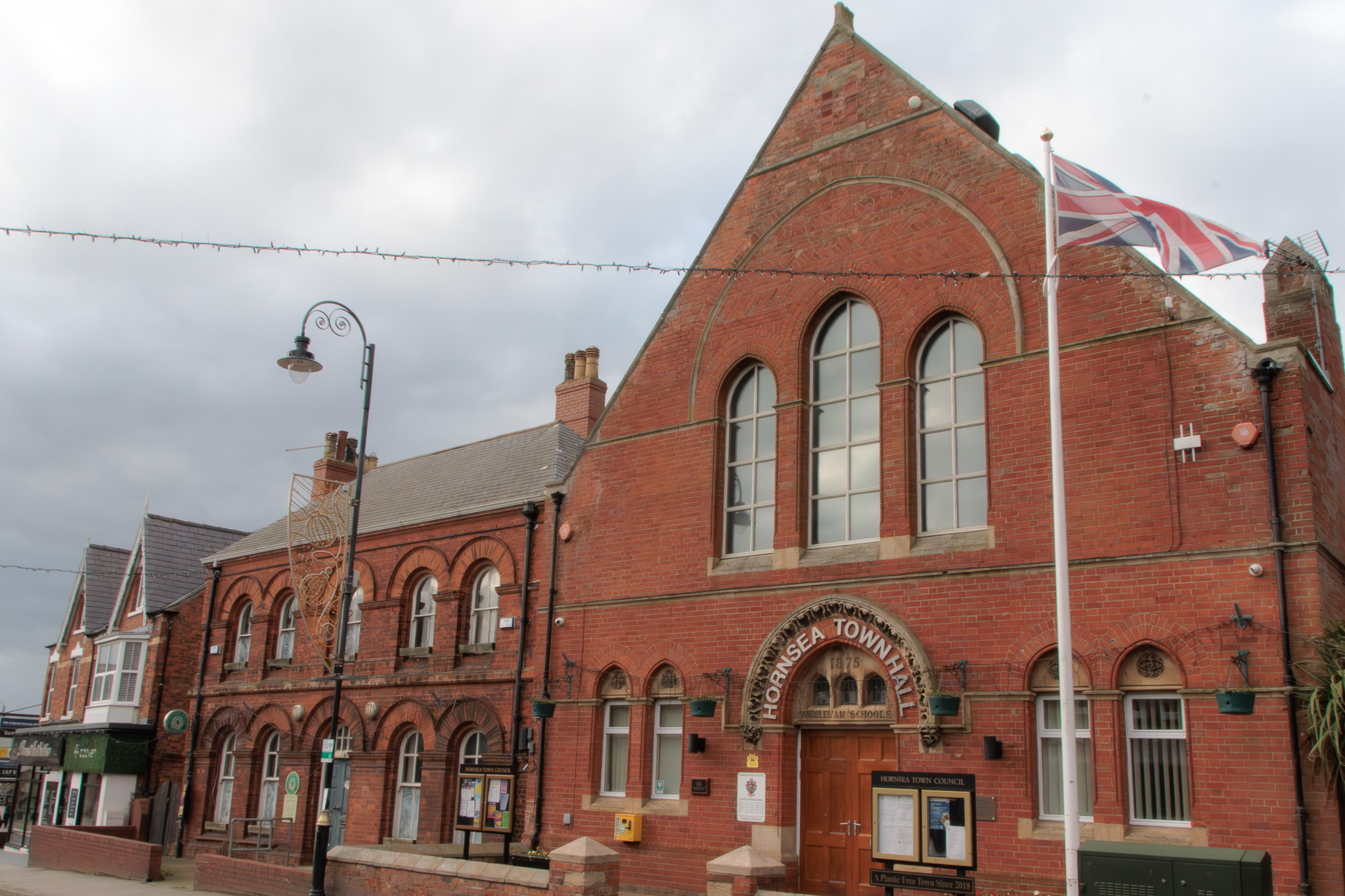
- The building in 2026

- Shown in the East Riding of Yorkshire
- 53.9120°N 0.1679°W
- Location: Newbegin, Hornsea

History
- Built: 1875

Site notes
- Architect: John K. James
- Architectural style: Gothic Revival style

Hornsea Town Hall is a municipal building in Newbegin in Hornsea, a town in the East Riding of Yorkshire in England. The building began life as a Wesleyan school, then became a church hall and finally became a town hall.

== History ==
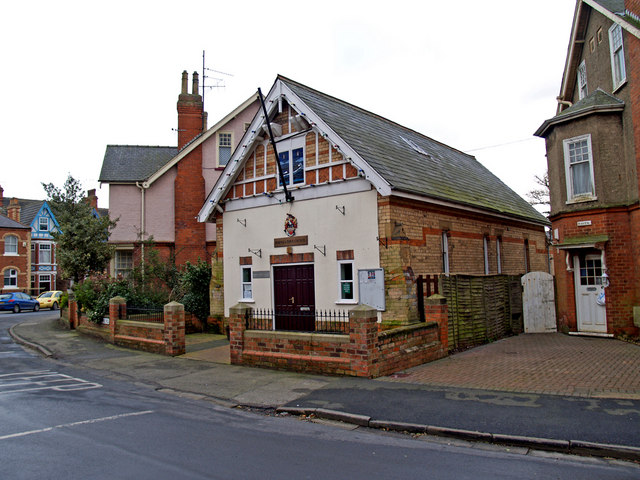
The old town hall in Burton Road, in municipal use from 1974 to 2011

Hornsea Urban District Council was formed in 1894, and it initially met in the town's public rooms on Newbegin. In 1927, the council purchased Elim Lodge on Cliff Road, to use as a town hall. Elim Lodge had been the home of Thomas Barton Holmes who had served as a director of the Hull and Selby Railway in the mid-19th century. It continued to serve as the meeting place of the council for much of the 20th century, but ceased to be the local seat of government when the enlarged Holderness Borough Council was formed in 1974. Elim Lodge was subsequently closed for municipal use and later became a nursing home.

After Hornsea Town Council was formed in 1974, it started meeting in the town's former lifeboat station in Burton Road. That property, designed in the Swiss style, remained in municipal use until 2011.

The current town hall in Newbegin was constructed as a Wesleyan school. It was designed by John K. James of Kingston upon Hull in the Gothic Revival style, built in red brick and was completed in 1875. The style was intended to complement the adjacent Methodist Church which had been designed by the same architect and had been completed five years earlier. The design of the school involved a symmetrical main frontage of three bays facing onto Newbegin. The central bay featured an arched doorway with the year "1875" and the words "Wesleyan Schools" carved into the tympanum. There was a large tri-partite window at first floor level reaching into the gable above. The outer bays were fenestrated by pairs of arched windows with window sills and carvings in the tympana. Internally, the principal room was a large full-height assembly hall.

The Wesleyan school eventually became redundant and was converted into a church hall for the adjacent Methodist Church. In 2011, Hornsea Town Council decided to purchase the former church hall and to convert it for municipal use. The conversion works, which were carried out by Kemp Developments, involved adding additional floors to the former single-storey building, as well as installing a lift to connect the floors. In addition to offices for the town council, the works created meeting spaces for community groups and businesses.

The building was used as a refuge for people evacuated from their homes during coastal flooding caused by a storm surge in January 2017.
