= Hornsea Cottage Hospital =

Hospital in the East Riding of Yorkshire, England

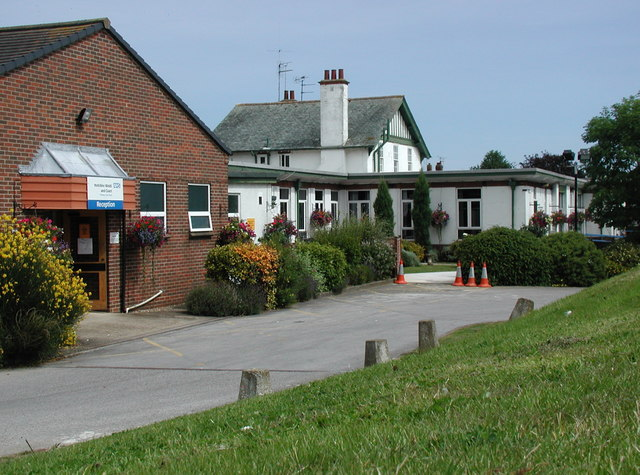
- Hornsea Cottage Hospital

- Shown in the East Riding of Yorkshire

Geography
- Location: Eastgate, Hornsea, East Riding of Yorkshire, England
- Coordinates: 53.9152°N 0.1692°W

Organisation
- Care system: NHS

Services
- Emergency department: No

History
- Founded: 1923

Links
- Lists: Hospitals in England

Hornsea Cottage Hospital is a health facility in Eastgate, Hornsea, East Riding of Yorkshire, England.

== History ==
The facility, which was built as a lasting memorial to soldiers who died in the First World War, opened in 1923. Originally providing just eight beds, it joined the National Health Service in 1948 and benefited from a major refurbishment in 2012. The minor injuries unit closed in April 2018.
