= Bettison's Folly =

Folly in the East Riding of Yorkshire, England

Coordinates: 53.910196°N 0.169234°W

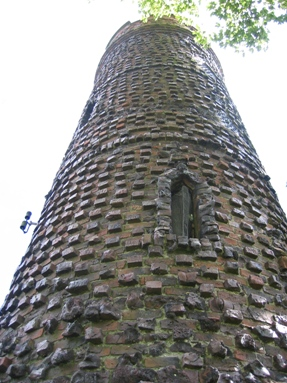
Bettison's Folly, Hornsea

Bettison's Folly is a tower in Hornsea, East Riding of Yorkshire, England. Also referred to as Bettisons Tower and the Forgotten Folly, it was built some time between 1829 and 1853 by William Bettison.

At the time, Bettison was a Hull-based brewer who built the folly in what was then his garden. In those days communication was by sight, so his manservant would ascend the tower at the usual time his master returned from work, see him descending Southorpe hill and run down the tower to ensure "dinner was served" as the master walked into the house. It incorporates a cranked up flagpole, initially installed to convey private messages. During the Second World War the tower was an air raid look-out point and siren (Hull was the most heavily bombed UK city after London). The siren was still in use in the late 1950s when a new siren was erected on the new fire station on Southgate. The Folly is decorated with locally made "treacle" bricks, highly fired for durability and subject to misshaping.

Nowadays, Bettison's Folly is a Grade II listed building and stands in the middle of a new housing estate off Newbegin, the main street. It is rarely open to the public.

In 2011, Huffington Post included the folly in their unordered list of the "Top 10 Pieces of Folly Architecture".

== See also ==
- Listed buildings in Hornsea
