= No. 251 Squadron RAF =

Defunct flying squadron of the Royal Air Force

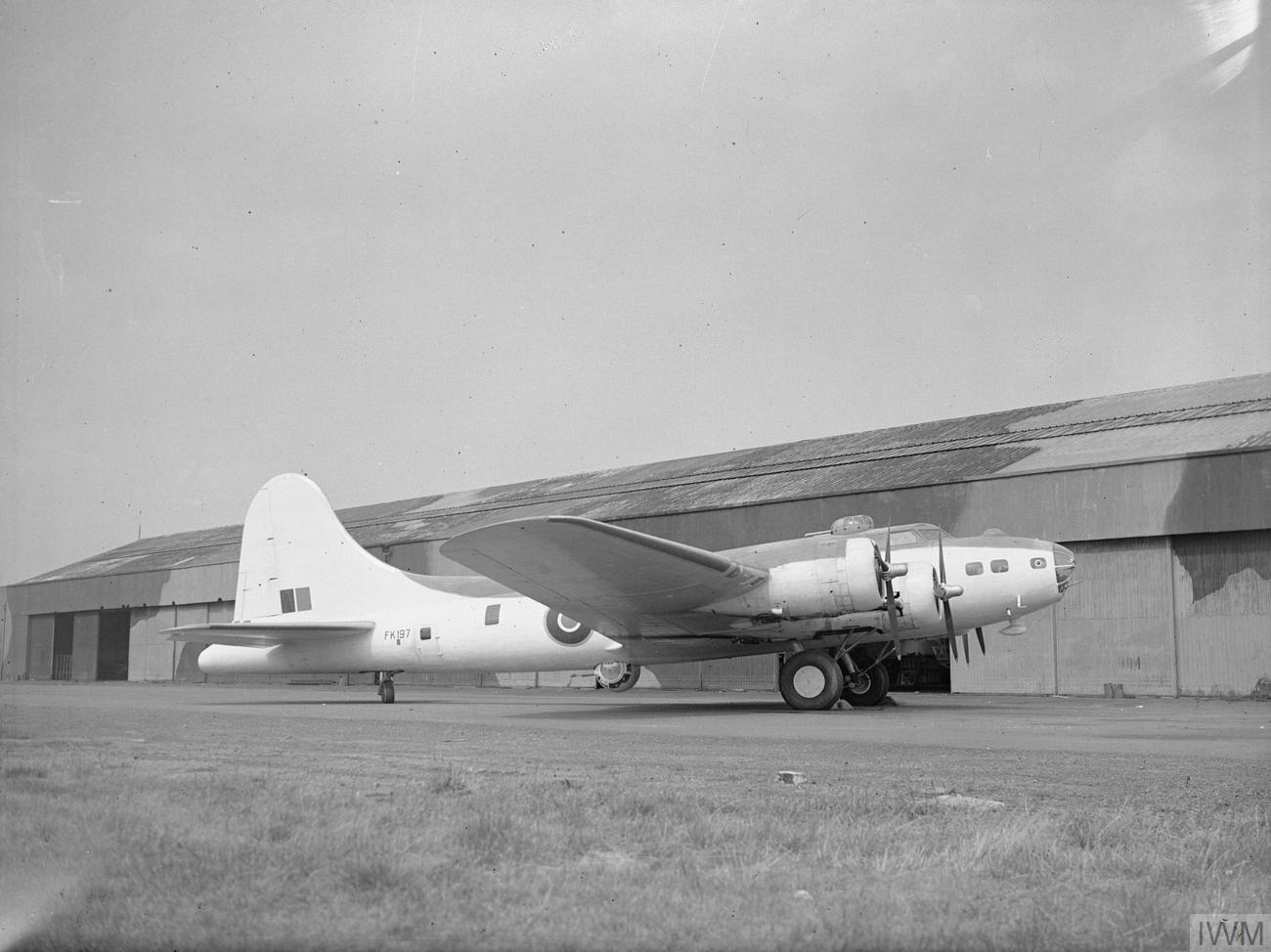
- A Fortress GR Mark IIA of No. 251, which undertook meteorological reconnaissance flights from Reykjavik
- Active: 31 May 1918 – 30 June 1919, 1 August 1944 – 30 October 1945
- Country: United Kingdom
- Branch: Royal Air Force
- Part of: RAF Coastal Command
- Motto: "However wind blows."

Insignia
- Squadron Badge heraldry: A weathercock
- Squadron Codes: AD Aug 1944 – Oct 1945

No. 251 Squadron was a Royal Air Force Squadron which operated during the First World War and the Second World War. It was disbanded in 1945 and remains inactive.

== History ==
No. 251 Squadron RAF was first formed in August 1918 from Nos. 504, 505, 506 and 510 (Special Duty) Flights based at Hornsea but operating from Atwick, Stallingborough and Owthorne. The squadron flew anti-submarine patrols on the coast of Yorkshire for the remainder of World War I and was then disbanded on 30 June 1919.

No. 251 Squadron was then reformed after No. 1407 (Meteorological) Flight, stationed at Reykjavík, was renumbered for air-sea rescues on 1 August 1944. No. 1407 Flight had been formed in October 1941, receiving Lockheed Hudson aircraft in April 1942. The number of aircraft was expanded in November with more Hudsons and a few Handley Page Hampdens. The latter were replaced with Lockheed Venturas in 1943.

The new squadron also operated in a meteorological reconnaissance role until it was finally disbanded in October 1945.

== Aircraft operated ==
During its first time in operation, the squadron flew:

- Airco DH.6

During its second time in operation, the squadron flew:

- Avro Anson (August 1944 – October 1945)
- Lockheed Ventura (August 1944 – October 1944)
- Lockheed Hudson (August 1944 – August 1945)
- Boeing Fortress II (March 1945 – October 1945)
- Vickers Warwick (August 1945 – October 1945)

== See also ==
- List of Royal Air Force aircraft squadrons
