= Hornsea =

Town and civil parish in the East Riding of Yorkshire, England

- Town and civil parish
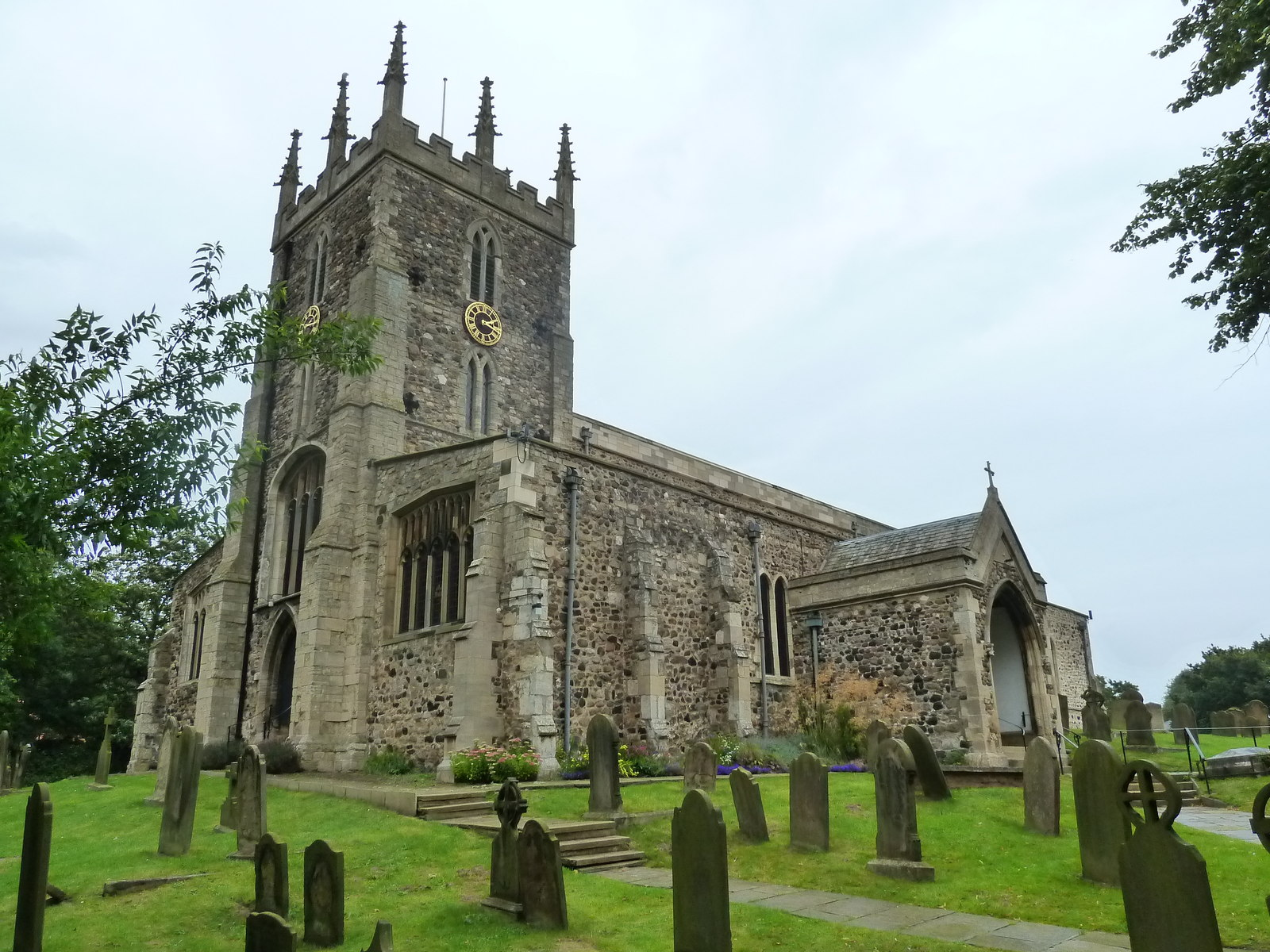
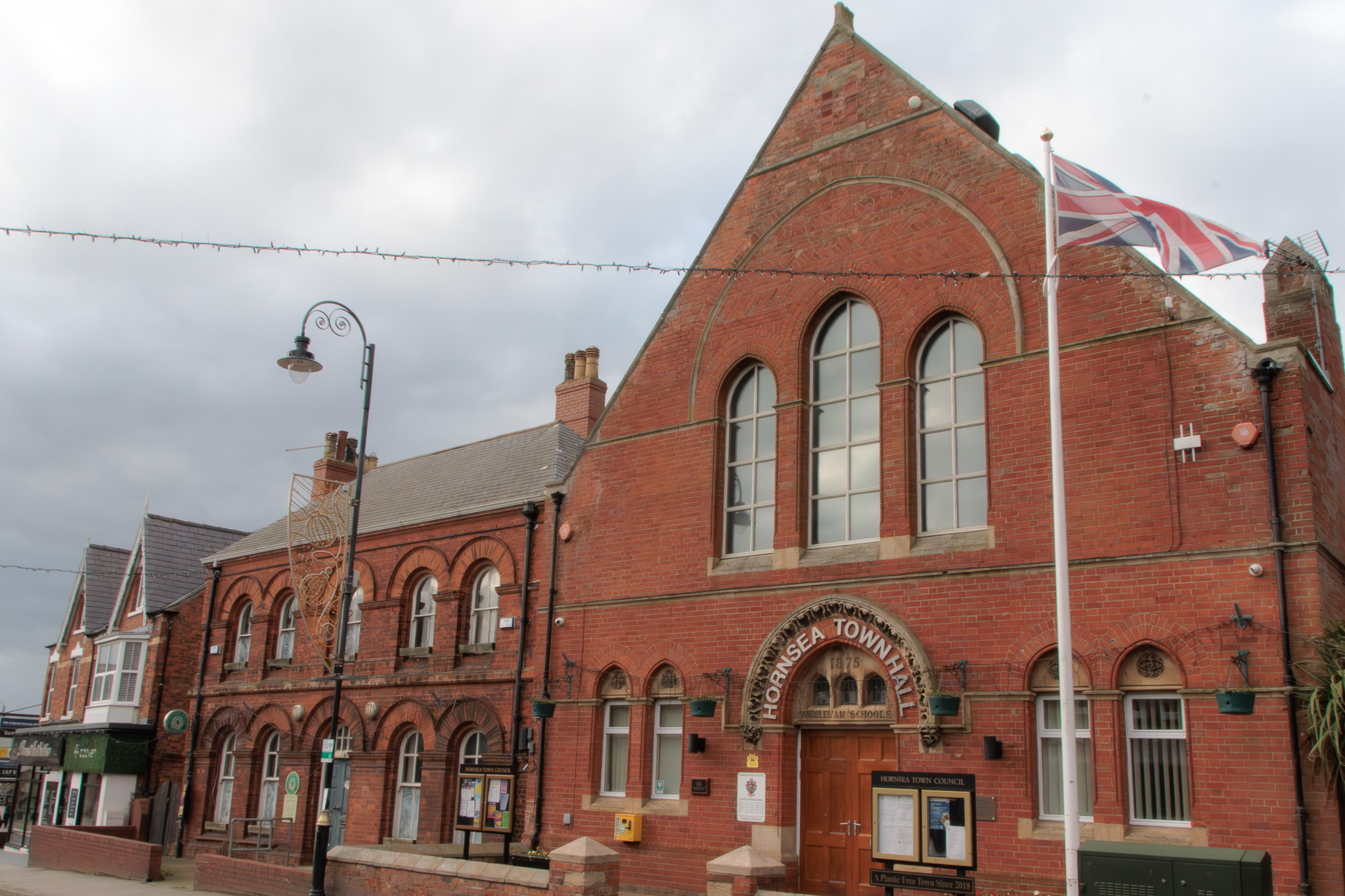
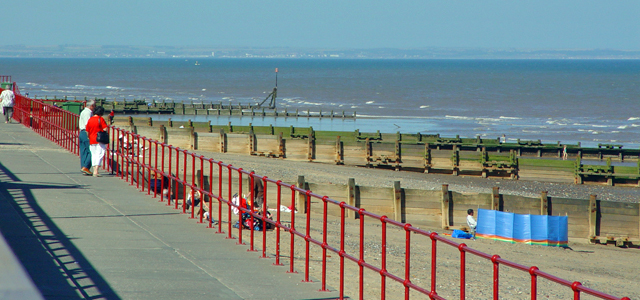
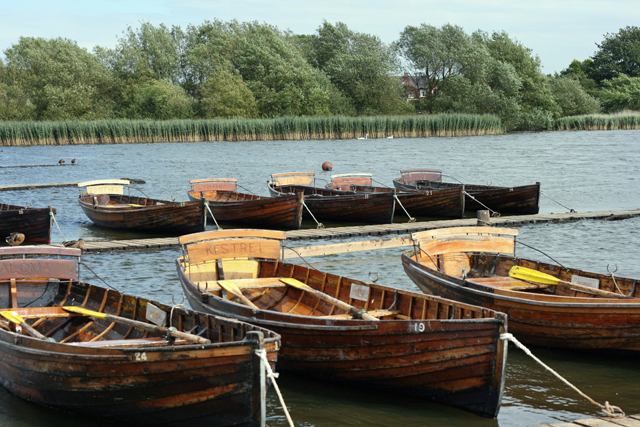
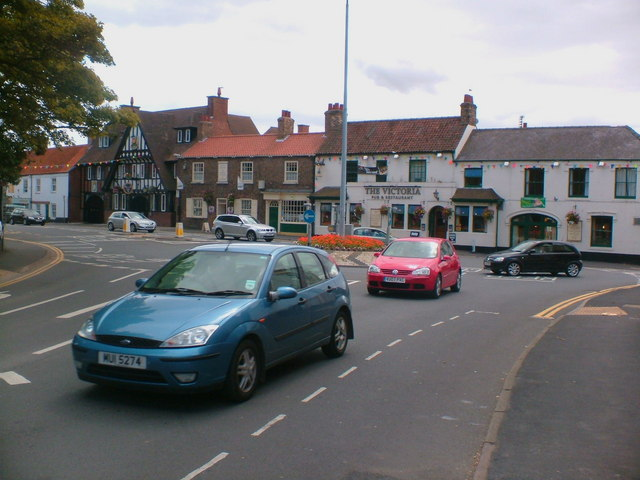
- St Nicholas Church Hornsea Town Hall Hornsea Seafront Hornsea Mere Market Street

- Location within the East Riding of Yorkshire
- Area: 4.61 sq mi (11.9 km^{2})
- Population: 8,787 (2021 Census)
  - Density: 1,906/sq mi (736/km^{2})
- OS grid reference: TA203476
- Civil parish: Hornsea
- Unitary authority: East Riding of Yorkshire
- Ceremonial county: East Riding of Yorkshire
- Region: Yorkshire and the Humber
- Country: England
- Sovereign state: United Kingdom
- Post town: HORNSEA
- Postcode district: HU18
- Dialling code: 01964
- Police: Humberside
- Fire: Humberside
- Ambulance: Yorkshire
- UK Parliament: Bridlington and The Wolds

Hornsea is a seaside town and civil parish in the East Riding of Yorkshire, England. The settlement dates to at least the early medieval period. The town was expanded in the Victorian era with the coming of the Hull and Hornsea Railway in 1864. In the First World War, the mere was briefly the site of RNAS Hornsea Mere, a seaplane base. During the Second World War, the town and beach were heavily fortified against invasion.

The civil parish encompasses Hornsea town; the natural lake, Hornsea Mere; and the lost or deserted villages of Hornsea Beck, Northorpe and Southorpe. Structures of note in the parish include the medieval parish church of St Nicholas, Bettison's Folly, Hornsea Mere and the sea front promenade.

The economy includes a mix of tourism and small manufacturing. Most notably, Hornsea Pottery was established in Hornsea in 1949 and closed in 2000. Modern Hornsea still functions as a coastal resort and has large caravan sites to the north and south.

The soft soil and low-lying geography result in consistent coastal erosion that threatens some of the infrastructure of the community. This is expected to worsen as climate change causes sea level rise. In some areas, residents have already been forced to take a managed retreat.

== Etymology and name ==
The name Hornsea likely derives from the Old Norse elements horn ("horn"), nes ("headland, promontory") and sæ ("sea, lake").

Hornsea may have been the site of Cornu Vallis, a place-name derived from Brittonic corno ("horn")

== Geography ==
The civil parish of Hornsea is located on the Holderness coast approximately 16 miles (25 km) north-east of Hull. The parish is bounded by the civil parishes of Atwick to the north, Seaton to the west, Hatfield and Mappleton to the south, and by the North Sea to the east. The civil parish contains the coastal town of Hornsea, and a suburb of "Hornsea Bridge" or "Hornsea Burton" south of the former railway line, (Note: The modern (2006) 1:25000 Ordnance Survey maps shows a place named 'Hornsea Burton' here that should not be confused with the lost village of Hornsea Burton. The modern settlement is here referred to as the "Hornsea Bridge suburb" to avoid confusion.) as well as Hornsea Mere. Excluding the town and its suburbs there are no other habitations of note in the parish, except some farms. The remainder of the parish is low lying farm land divided into fields.

Most of the civil parish lies at between 33 and 66 feet (10 and 20 m) above sea level, with the highest points in the parish under 98 feet (30 m). The B1242 road runs north to south parallel with the coast through the parish and the A1035 runs westward connecting with the A165 near Leven. Additionally a foot and cycle path, the Hornsea Rail Trail, part of the Trans Pennine Trail runs south-west from the town centre towards Hull.

Hornsea Mere is a lake of around 1.2 by 0.6 miles (2 by 1 km) with an outflow towards the sea by the Stream Dike Drain. This drain also separates Hornsea from the Hornsea Bridge suburb.

At the 2021 census, Hornsea parish had a population of 8,787. Hornsea is in the Parliamentary constituency of Beverley and Holderness.

=== Geology and erosion ===
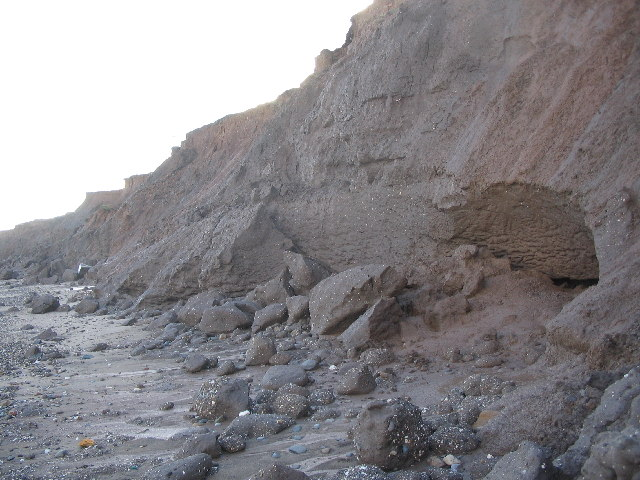
Eroded cliff at South Cliff, Hornsea

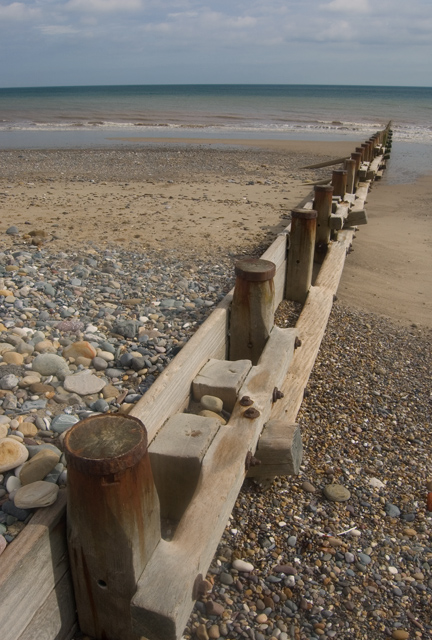
Hornsea groyne

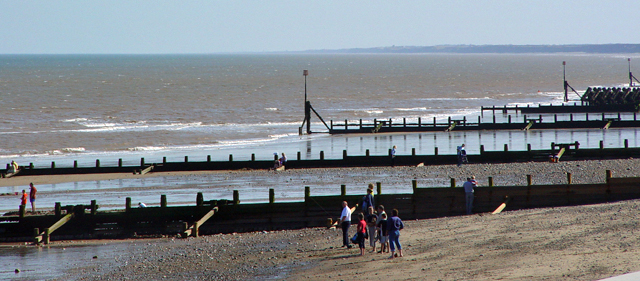
Groynes on Hornsea Sands

The underlying geology is primarily boulder clay. High points in the area are formed of gravel. (See moraine.) The topsoils are fine and loamy, whilst the rock beneath the boulder clay is classed as Flamborough Chalk from the Upper Cretaceous period. Historically large stones in the boulder clay were removed for use in road construction – this activity had been prohibited at Hornsea by the board of trade by 1885. Sands and clays were also used locally in building (c. 1885), though better quality materials were found elsewhere.

Some early writers (William Camden 1551–1623) thought that ground conditions in the area were evidence of an earthquake, whilst Poulson 1840 supposed the Mere and fossil finds to be evidence of a great flood or deluge in the area. Since at least the late 19th century the geological conditions overlying the underlying chalk have been interpreted as being from a glacial process in origin – both the boulder clay and the gravel beds and moraines.

Borings suggest the chalk probably lies at around 60 to 70 feet (18 to 21 m) under the sand, gravel and clay beds at Hornsea, though possibly deeper. Water in Hornsea has been obtained from wells and bore holes, though some borings have yielded water contaminated with iron, whilst others failed to reach an aquifer even at a depth of 976 feet (297 m).

The Mere is the last of many lakes in the Holderness area – the remainder had been drained by the late 19th century. At the sea remains of a submarine forest were found in a bed of peat found around halfway between cliff and lower water. The trees found were oak, alder and willow. A variety of fossils have been found in the deposits, including those of the extinct Eurasian cave lion (Felis spelaea), Woolly Mammoth (Elephas primigenius), Aurochs (Bos primigenius) as well as Red Deer (Cervus elaphus) and Horse species (Equus). Molluscs found in the subterranean gravel appear to have been freshwater species. It is thought the source of the submarine forests recorded on the coast at Hornsea may have been a second mere on the eastern side of the present lake which was silted and was lost to the sea at some point.

The coast at Hornsea is subject to erosion. The rate of erosion varies, but has been inferred at around 4 yards (3.7 m) per year in the latter part of the 16th century; estimated by George Poulson at 2 yards (1.8 m) per year in the late 18th century, though recorded at up to 6 yards (5.5 m) in some years in the same period. The rate of erosion may have been influenced by the presence or absence of erosion limiting groynes or a pier. South, at Hornsea Burton, erosion rates rose from 1.3 to 5 yards (1.2 to 4.6 m) pa between the periods 1845–76 and 1876–82, thought to be due to the construction of groynes north of the beach at Hornsea. The current (2008) rate of erosion is 1 foot 8 inches (0.5 m) north of and 6 feet 7 inches (2 m) south of Hornsea – the difference due to the defences at Hornsea preventing the renewing flow of sediment southwards.

An apocryphal inscription said to have been found in Hornsea references the nearing of the sea by erosion – the figure of ten miles given as the distance the town once stood from the sea is certainly artistic licence.

Hornsea steeple, when I built thee,

Thou was 10 miles off Burlington,

10 miles off Beverley, and 10 miles off sea.

— anon,

=== Hornsea town ===
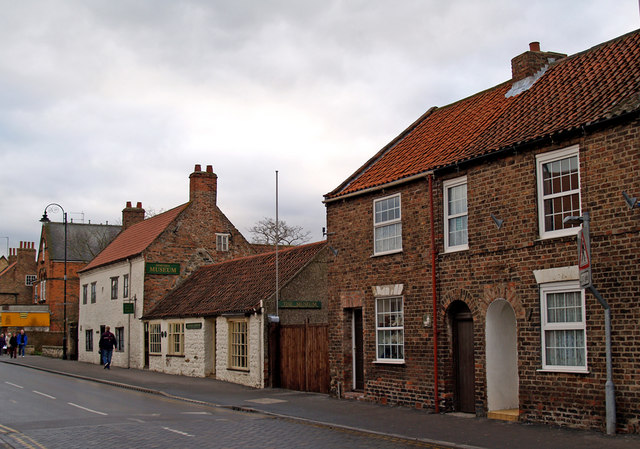
Hornsea Museum and houses on Newbegin (2007)

The old town of Hornsea is centred on the Market Place, and includes Southgate, Westgate and Mere Side; the resort and promenade is connected to the old town by Newbegin and New Road, and includes much of the Victorian development of the town. Buildings in the town are predominately red brick, with pantile or slate roofs; some structures use local cobbles as a building material. Modern Hornsea also incorporates several caravan sites, mainly on the northern and southern edge. There are two notable parks in Hornsea, Hall Garth Park which includes a historic moated site, and the Memorial Gardens.

The area of 'old' Hornsea centred on the Market Place, and including Hall Garth Park and the large houses around Hornsea Town railway station and Grosvenor Road are now (2007) part of a Conservation Area – the area excludes the 19th/20th century resort, and promenade.

Like other small North Sea coastal resorts Hornsea has a promenade, laid out gardens, hotels, fish and chip shops, gift shops and so on. On the southern edge of Hornsea, near the site of Hornsea Pottery is a shopping centre known as Hornsea Freeport – the Freeport adapted some of the original theme park set up by Hornsea Pottery.

There are three schools in Hornsea: Hornsea Community Primary School, Hornsea Burton Primary School and Hornsea School and Language College.

Hornsea has an independent lifeboat service provided by Hornsea Inshore Rescue, a registered charity since 1994.

Hornsea has a high frequency of all-day public transport bus service to and from Hull, Beverley, Hessle and a daily service to Bridlington, and to Withernsea.

== History ==
=== Prehistory to medieval ===
There is evidence of prehistoric human activity in the area. Near Norththorpe, north of Hornsea crop marks indicate a site interpreted as a Neolithic henge monument, thought to have been later reused as a Bronze Age ringwork. The site is similar to one excavated at Paddock Hill, near Thwing. The site consists of cropmarks indicating circular 20 to 26 feet (6 to 8 m) ditch surrounding a 160 feet (50 m) diameter circular area, with a probably entrance point at the east-south-east. There are cropmark indications that an outer ditch existed and that a roundhouse or henge was located inside the monument. Prehistoric finds in Hornsea include a polished Neolithic stone axehead, Neolithic or Bronze Age flints, and Bronze Age flint arrowhead.

There are also cropmarks in the Hornsea area indicating human activity during the Iron Age/Roman Britain period, thought to the remnants of field systems.

An Anglo-Saxon burial ground was discovered in 1913 near the Hydro on Cliff Road; the site was re-excavated in 1982. Thirteen skeletons were initially found, and a further six at the later excavations – a wide variety of grave goods were found including vases, and objects of bronze, ivory, bone, silver, jet and beads.

Hornsea is mentioned as a Manor, as Hornesse, in the Domesday Book of 1086. After the Norman Conquest of England in 1066, overlordship passed from Morcar to Drogo de la Beuvrière. Drogo fled to Flanders c. 1086 after killing his wife, a relative of William the Conqueror, and Holderness subsequently passed to Odo, Count of Aumale. In around 1088 Odo gave the manor, church and lands at Hornsea to the Benedictine St Mary's Abbey, York. Rights of fishing in the Mere also passed to the Abbey.

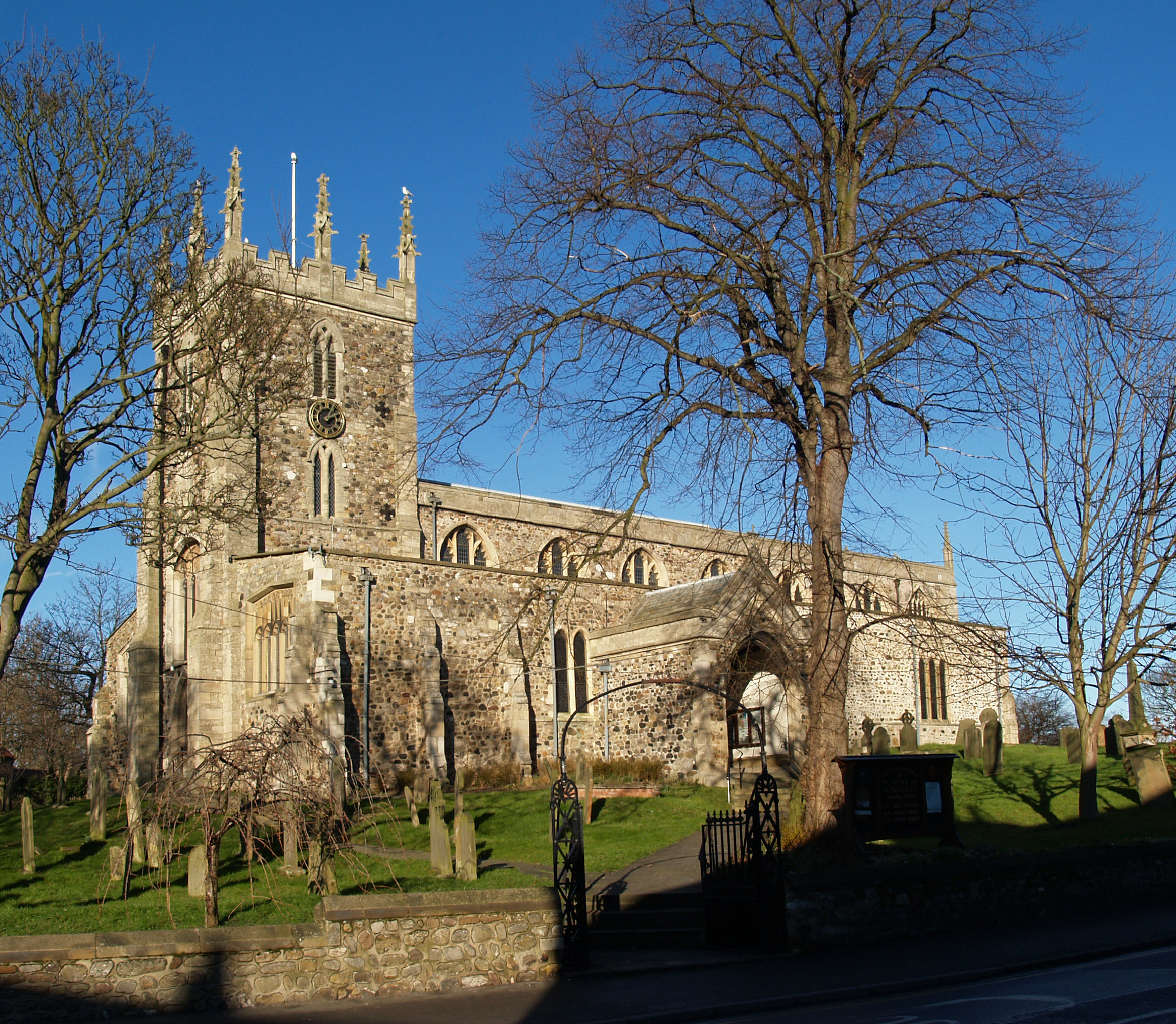
Church of St Nicholas. (2007)

St Nicholas' Church, Hornsea dates to the 13th century, with alterations in the 14th and 15th centuries. The church is of cobbles plus stone dressings, much of it in the perpendicular style. The font, some memorials and an effigy also date to the 13th century, a restored former medieval market cross is found in the churchyard. The church tower was formerly surmounted by a spire, reported as ruinous in the early 1710s and said to have fallen down in 1733. The church was extensively restored in the 1860s by George Gilbert Scott, including rebuilding of the upper tower; further work was done at the beginning of the 20th century by Brodrick, Lowther & Walker. The medieval rectory of the church was located to the north, at a moated site – some earthwork remains are still extant, and were incorporated into the public Hall Garth Park in the 19th century. The church's crypt is said to have been used as a storage base by local smugglers. Other remnants of the medieval town include the c. 14th century Hornsea Cross on Southgate, probably formed of remnants of other medieval crosses.

During the medieval period Hornsea was a market town, and also functioned as a fishing town and port. In 1377 the Poll Tax recorded 271 tax payers in Hornsea, and a further 264 at Hornsea Beck, and 96 at Hornsea Burton; in 1490 the parish of Hornsea recorded that there were 340 persons in Hornsea, and 240 at Hornsea Beck and 50 at Hornsea Burton.

There is limited evidence on the extent to which Hornsea functioned as a port. However, there are several medieval references to it. In 1228 documents refer to tolls on merchandise from ships both north and south of the beck. Holinshed noted Horneseie Beck as amongst the places on the coast used for trade; and sometime before the reign of Elizabeth I (16th century) the large sum of £3,000 had been spent on a pier at Hornsea – it was destroyed by the sea sometime around the latter half of the 16th century.

Coastal erosion had ended Hornsea's importance as a port by the 16th century, though its market continued to be important locally.

After the Dissolution of the Monasteries (1540), right of ownership of Hornsea were returned to the Crown from St Mary's Abbey. Subsequently, the property was split into three parts – the manor, church and mere.

There were windmills in Hornsea during the medieval period – two belonging to the Abbey of St Mary's are recorded in the 16th century. There was another in Hornsea Burton, recorded as early as 1584, and is documented again in 1663, with the site still recorded in the late 19th century – the mill was located at the end of the Mill Lane (now Burton Lane).

=== 17th to 19th centuries ===
83 houses were recorded for tax purposes in 1676; and a record of 133 families in the parish was made in 1743. By 1801 the population was 533, rising steadily to 704 by 1811, then to 780 in 1831, and to 1,005 in 1841.

There were several Quakers in Hornsea in the mid 17th century – an early meeting room was in a cottage in Westgate. In 1676 three cottages in Southgate were recorded as being given up for the use as a cemetery by the Acklams, a Quaker family.

In 1732 the town was struck by a 'hurricane' which in addition to destroying the church's spire, unroofed around 40 buildings, as well as causing part of the vicarage to collapse, and overturned one windmill. Another windmill is recorded on Atwick Road in 1732, and in 1820–21 a new windmill was built – by 1909 it was steam operated.

Historically, the common building material in the area has been brick or cobbles – extant buildings in brick date to as early as the late 17th century, alternatively large cobbles have also been used in the area for building construction – several structures of this type survive in the town, dating to the late 17th, 18th or 19th century, including some listed buildings, utilising cobbles or cobbles with brick. The Old Hall in Hornsea Market Place dates to the early 17th century, and is built of brick on cobble foundations.

Whilst enclosure at Hornsea Burton had begun around 1660, the fields around Hornsea were enclosed in 1809.

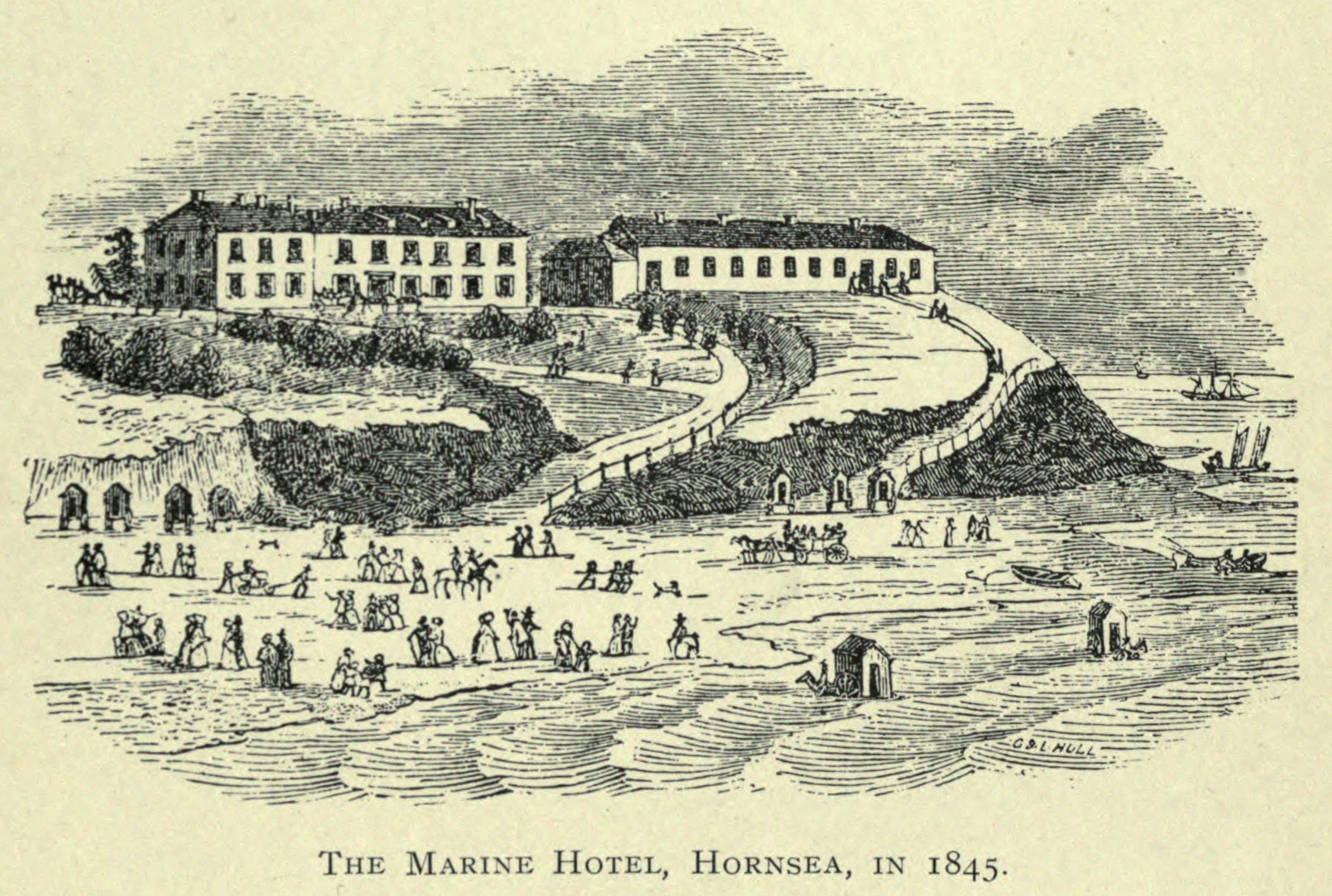
Marine Hotel and Hornsea Beach in 1845

By the mid 19th century Hornsea comprised three main streets at the eastern end of the Mere – Westgate, Southgate and Market Place; two streets, Newbegin and Eastgate led eastward towards the sea from Market Place, merging around 200 yards (180 m) from the cliff – the land east of Hornsea town towards the sea was in agricultural use.

A Quaker meeting house, located to the rear of Westgate, now known as 'Quaker Cottage' was used in the 18th century for meetings. Non-conformist churches were built in the early 19th century – an Independent chapel was built on Southgate near to the Market Place c. 1808, with a burial ground to the rear; and a Wesleyan chapel built on the corner of Back Southgate/Mere Side/Chamber's Lane c. 1814, (replaced in 1870 by one in Newbegin and later used as a school); a Primitive Methodist chapel was built on Westgate in 1835, replaced and then demolished after a replacement was built in the Market Place in 1864, with a minister's house built on the site.

A tower folly, Bettison's Folly was built c. 1844, by local brewmaster William Bettison, a tower built by a local business man in the 19th century. The tower contains the only fully working retractable flag pole in the country.

Hornsea was promoted as a seaside resort from around 1800, with early attractions including bathing machines, horse races on the beach and a chalybeate spring near the mere. More facilities were built in the 1830s including the first Marine Hotel.

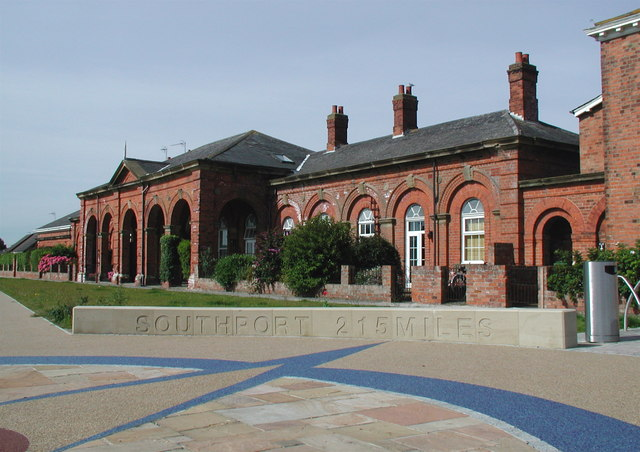
Former Hornsea Town railway station, built 1864 (2007)

A railway line was sanctioned in 1846 from Arram to Hornsea in 1846, but was unbuilt following the fall of George Hudson and the financial problems of the York and North Midland Railway. In 1861 a company was formed to promote railways in the East Riding of Yorkshire, and obtained an act for a 13 miles (21 km) line from Wilmington, Kingston upon Hull to Hornsea in 1862. Joseph Armitage Wade, a Hull timber merchant and Hornsea resident was a key promoter of the line. Work began October 1862, with the line completed early 1864 the Hull and Hornsea Railway. Hornsea railway station was designed by Rawlins Gould, built in brick with sandstone, with five central bays surrounded by two five bay extensions on either side – the station is still extant and was listed 1979. Hornsea Bridge railway station was built short of the Hornsea Town terminus, and functioned as a goods station as well as a passenger station. The new railway not only benefited the resort, but also enabled Hornsea to function as a dormitory suburb to Hull.

There was significant growth in the small scale fishing that took place at Hornsea before the railway – persons recorded as Fishermen rose from 3 in 1851 to a dozen or more in the 1870s to 1890s, with 12 boats and 20 men recorded in 1894 – crab was the major catch, rather than wet fish – crabbing continued to the 1930s but declined after the Second World War.

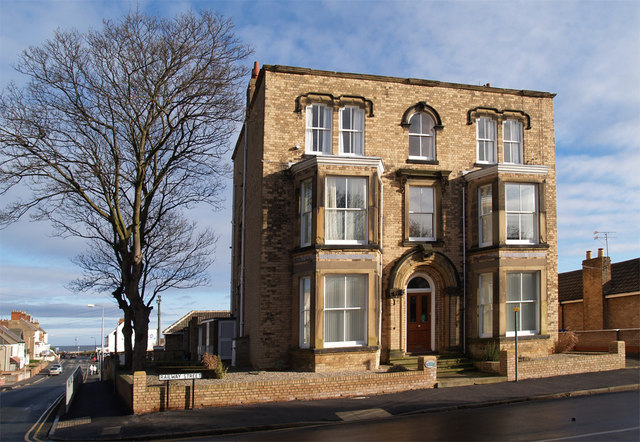
Brampton House, built 1872–73 (2007)

At the same time as the promotion and development of the railway the town was also improved: New Road was laid out in 1848 to improve access to the sea – in the 1860s/'70s Joseph Wade establishing a brick and tile works, and developed Grosvenor Terrace – No.31 of which was layered with his patent 'Acorn' tiles. The coming of the railway was followed by further development, including Alexandra Hotel (1867); Wilton Terrace (1868); the high status dwellings Brampton House (1872–73); and the Grosvenor Estate, built during the period from 1865 to the early 20th century.

Civic improvements following or coincidental the opening of the railway included a gas works (1864, J.A. Wade); a gasworks for the Lansdowne estate, Cliff Road (1870, W.M. Jackson, closed 1899); improved drainage (1874–75, local board); and a Waterworks on Atwick Road (c. 1878, local board).

Wade's brickworks was established c. 1865 south of Hornsea Bridge railway station – by 1890 an hydraulic engineering works had been established adjacent west, both close to the site of the modern Freeport. There was also a short lived brickworks north of the mere, and sand and gravel extraction also took place in the parish, as well as lime kiln activity. (see also § Geology.)

The sea front was also developed, the 1837 Marine Hotel was rebuilt in 1874, and again in 1900; gardens were added to the north in 1898; and the Imperial Hydro Hotel built 1914 on the Esplanade (demolished c. 1990). Between 1878 and 1880 a 1,072 feet (327 m) pier was constructed – it was damaged within a year after a ship collided with it during a storm, shortening it by 300 feet (91 m). In 1897 the pier was sold for demolition. The entrance building remained as an amusement arcade until the 1920s.

Other notable mid 19th century additions to the town include the two storey three bay vicarage on Newbegin; the stuccoed Pike and Heron public house (c. 1830); a Primitive Methodist chapel in the Market Place built 1864; a Gothic Revival style non-conformist Congregational church on Hornsea Cliff Road/New Road, built 1868; and the Wesleyan church and adjacent church hall on Newbegin, built 1870, replacing the one in Back Southgate.

By 1864 the population had risen on 1,685, then to 1,836 in 1881 and to 2,013 by 1891, reaching 2,381 by 1901.

=== 20th century ===
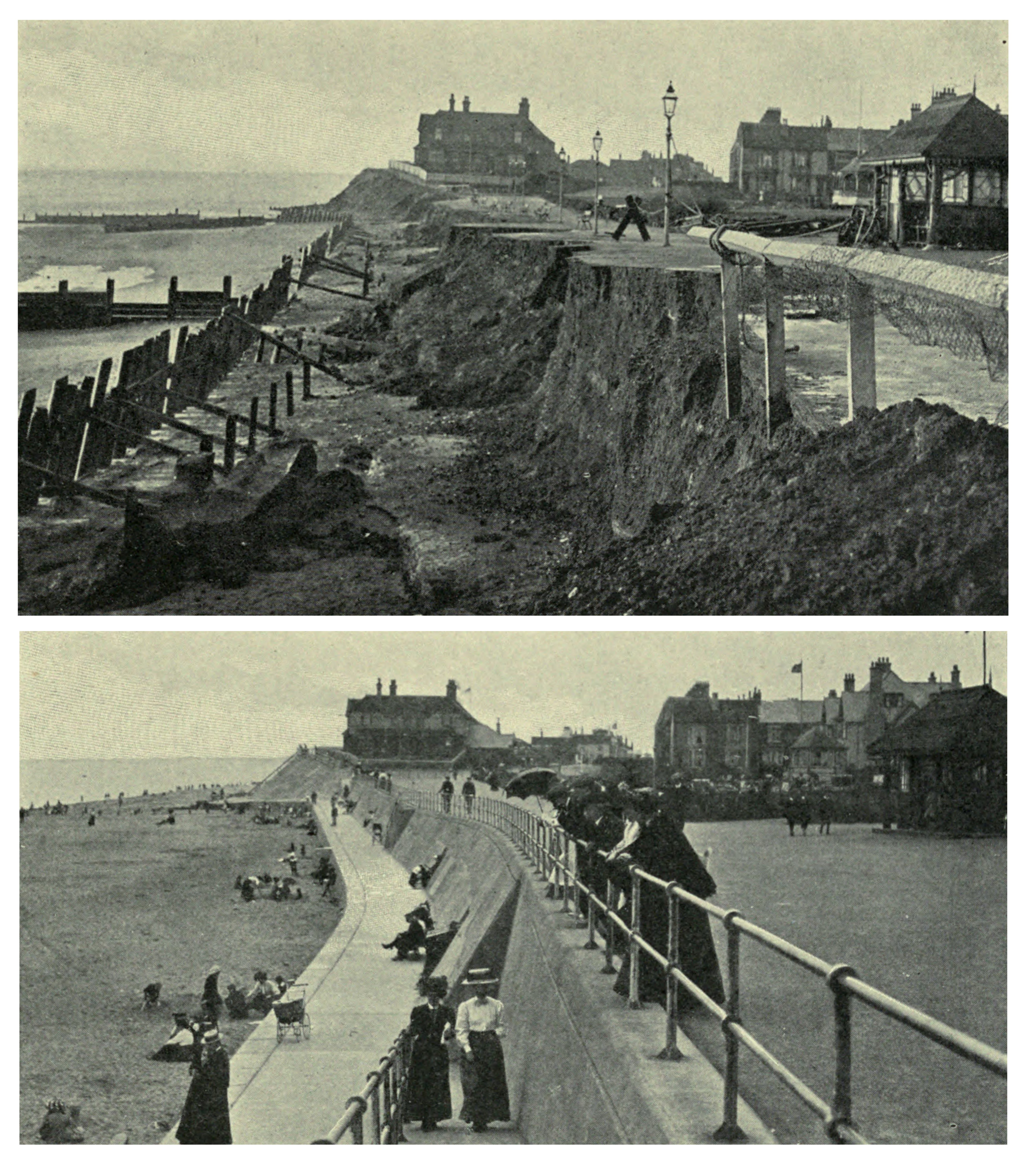
The seafront after the 1906 storm, and in 1910 after construction of the seawall

By the early 1900s the old town centred on the Market Place had grown little, but new developments had been built near Hornsea Town railway station, specifically the new streets of Eastbourne, Burton, and Alexandra Road; additionally a new estate had been built at the sea front, north of the old road to the sea along Cliff Road – this included the (new) Marine Hotel, as well the promenade and gardens parallel to the new Flamborough Terrace Road and the new (1907) sea defences. The promenade and gardens (Victoria Gardens) were begun in the 1890s. The Floral Hall was added to the seafront gardens in 1913 – both the gardens and hall were extended in 1928.

New sea defences were constructed c. 1907 following a destructive storm on the east coast in March 1906. The timber defences were destroyed or damaged by the storm with most of the beach swept away, and a large amount of cliff eroded exposing the underlying clay. The new defences at Hornsea were constructed north of New Road protecting the seafront at Marine Terrace and Victoria Gardens. The works consisted of four groynes plus a concrete sea wall reinforced by steel pile supports. The work was carried out by A. Fasey and Son (Leytonstone) under W. T. Douglas of Westminster. The sea wall was lengthened by 450 and 1,240 feet (140 and 380 m) to the north and south respectively in 1923, and extended south beyond the stream dike outlet of the mere in 1930.

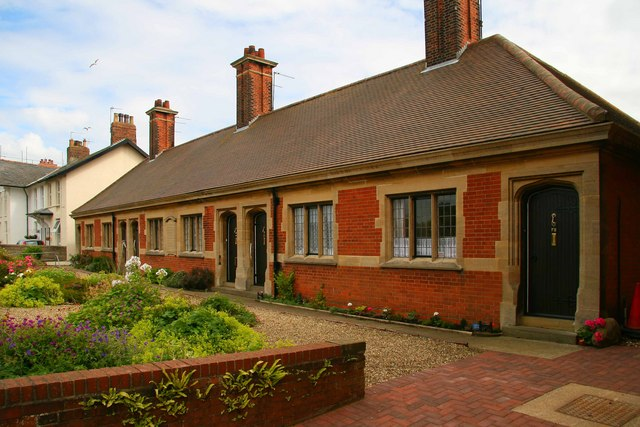
Pickering Almshouses, built 1908 (2008)

Early 20th century additions to the town included a Church Institute built 1906–07; and the Pickering Almshouses (see Christopher Pickering) built 1908; both on Newbegin. A convalescent home, Gregson Court was built on Cliff Road in 1908–09. The early 20th century house, Farrago, on Wilton Road, built with a bolted steel frame with brick and stone dressing by builder David Reynard Robinson is now listed. Hornsea Golf Course was established a mile south of the town in 1910 to a design by Sandy Herd. (The course is outside the modern parish in Mappleton.)

During the First World War a seaplane base was constructed on Hornsea Mere, named RNAS Hornsea Mere, the base was used to operate submarine patrols in the North Sea. The base was abandoned after the end of the war.

By the 1920s the town had grown further, generally infill and fringe development, as well as housing further along Newbegin and Eastgate blurring the separation between the old town and the seaside resort. A park had also been built between the Eastgate and Newbegin filling the area formerly known as Hall Garths. Some housing had also been built in the area around Hornsea Bridge station.

Civic improvements in the interbellum included transfer of the fire brigade (est.1902) to a former lifeboat house (1924); reconstruction of the sewers and supply of water from Hull via a water tower at Mappleton (1927); and an electricity supply, via the South East Yorkshire Light & Power Co. Ltd., with power supplied by Hull Corporation (1930). In 1927, the Urban District Council converted Elim Lodge into Hornsea Town Hall.

In 1938 Wakefield Metropolitan District Council opened a school in Hornsea on the open air principle, the site was used by the Free French during the Second World War, and later returned to educational use.

During the Second World War Hornsea was fortified with numerous anti-invasion structures, designed to prevent a beachhead being established at Hornsea by invading forces – beach defences consisted of pillboxes flanking the promenade, whilst the beach was protected by anti-tank cubes and mines; at South Cliff 4.7-inch guns were installed. Beyond the beach any potential invasion was protected against by road and rail blocks, further pillboxes, and minefields, limiting routes through the town to three roads and the railway line – the road access was narrowed by the use of concrete blocks and protected by pillboxes – the fortification was intended to hold up or delay any invasion force landing at Hornsea.

Many of the predominantly reinforced concrete structures are no longer extant, the recorded defences include: coastal beach defence batteries, with 4.7-inch gun batteries, other gun emplacements, numerous pillboxes, road blocks and road and railway antitank obstacles, including extensive anti-tank cubes on the beach, Royal Observer Corps posts, weapons pits and/or infantry trenches, barbed wire protected trackways and Army camps and associated facilities, including a camp "Rolston camp", located east of the Hornsea Bridge suburb on ground now destroyed by coastal erosion, with associated infantry trenches, grenade ranges, strongpoints and minefields, some farm buildings were also fortified. Other Second World War structures also included air raid shelters, and 'Diver' anti-aircraft battery designed to destroy V1 flying bombs. By the middle of the 20th century Hornsea had continued to grow, with new housing built or under construction south of Hornsea Town station, and at the coastal resort. New schools had also been established.

Hornsea's population rose consistently through the 20th century, with growth averaging several hundred persons per decade – by 1951 the population had risen by nearly 3,000 from 1900 levels to 5,324.

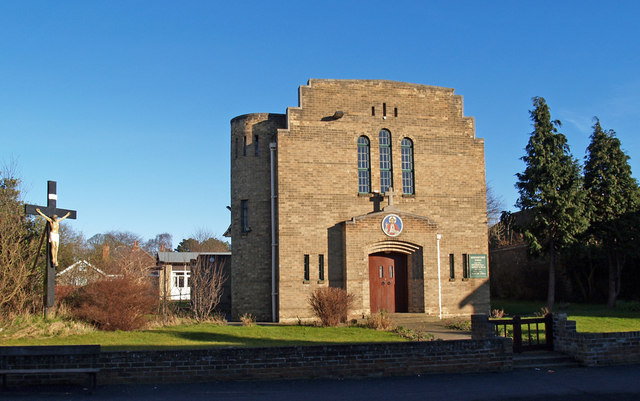
Catholic Sacred Heart church, built 1956 (2007)

Hornsea Pottery was founded 1949. In 1953 the business was moved to the former Wade brickworks (Marlborough Avenue), and the Hornsea Pottery Co. Ltd. established 1955. The company became a major local employer with 200 persons working by the 1960s.

The Catholic Sacred Heart Church, Hornsea was built in 1956 on Southgate.

The Hull to Hornsea railway line was closed in 1964/5. Hornsea Bridge Station was later demolished. The railway line's closure led to some contraction of the tourist industry, and decline in the town.

Civic improvements in the second half of the 20th century included a new fire station on Southgate (1965); the closure of the gas works, and transfer to North Sea gas (late 1960s); and a new outfall sewer and pumping station (1970s). Small industrial estates were built off Cliff Road in the late 1960s, and near Rolston Road on former railway land in the 1980s. (Hornsea Bridge Industrial estate, Old Bridge Road)

Much of the post war expansion was around south of Hornsea Bridge station, and west of Cliff Road to the north. By 1970 Hornsea's urban expansion had reached near the level maintained until the end of the 20th century. Housing was expanded to the west of the town off the B1244/Westgate on Cheyne Walk and later Cheyne Garth after the 1970s. The estate south of the town was expanded with the addition of Tansley Lane c. 2000.

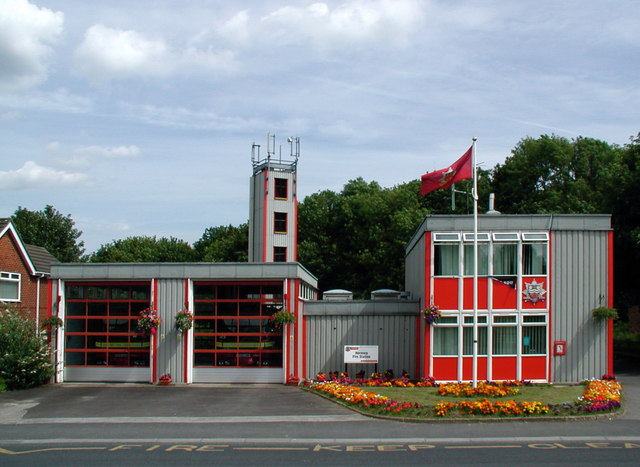
Hornsea Fire Station

A museum, The North Holderness Museum of Village Life (Hornsea Museum) was established in 1978, on Newbegin. Hornsea Pottery entered receivership in 1984 and after several changes of owner production ended in 2000. A visitor attraction was built at the site – in 1994 'Hornsea Freeport', a shopping attraction, was opened at the site. The town gained a swimming pool at 'Hornsea Leisure Centre' in 1996.

=== 21st century ===
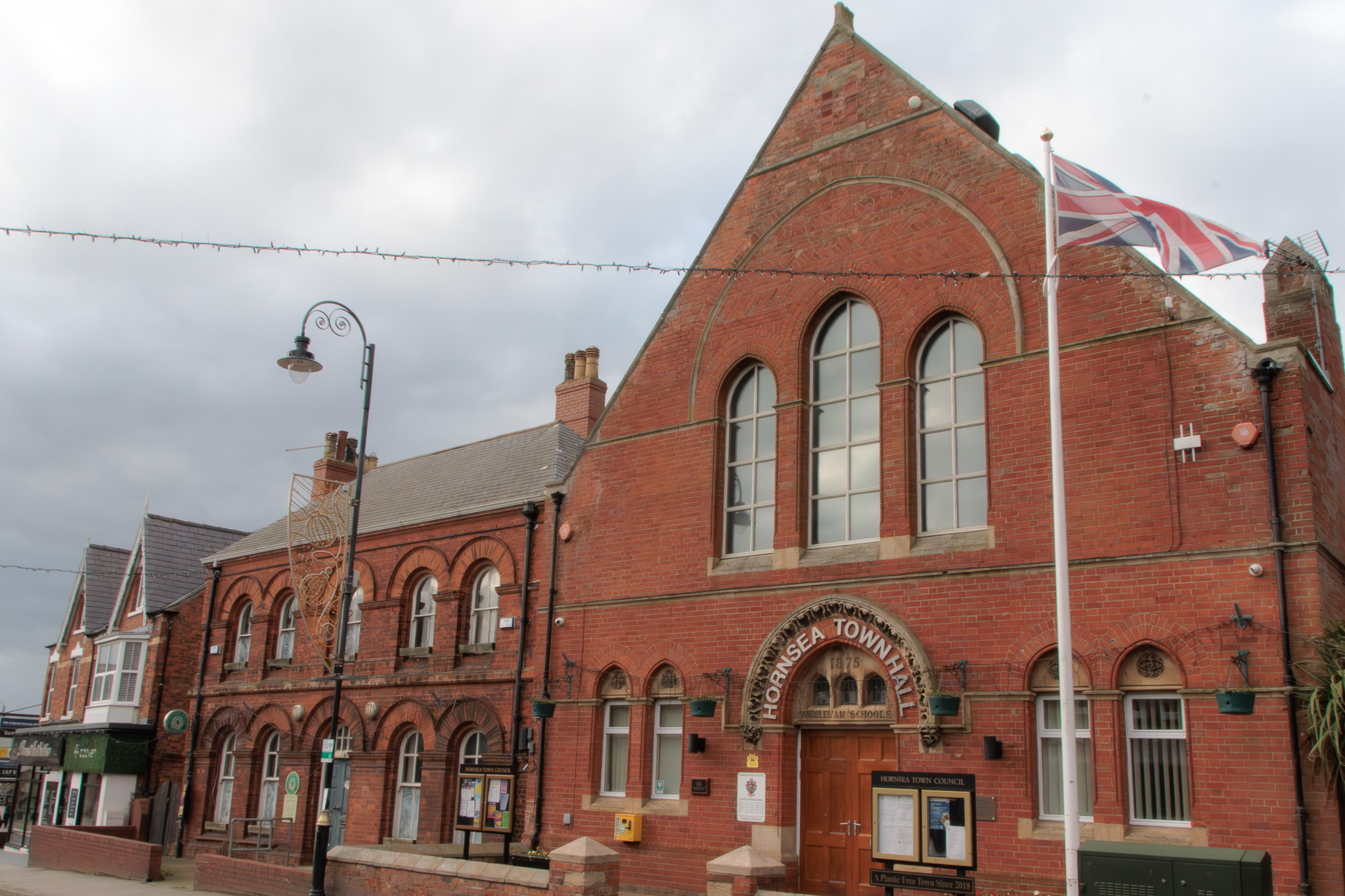
Hornsea Town Hall

In 2009 Tesco submitted and had accepted an application to build a large store near Southgate. The store opened January 2012.

By 2021, Hornsea's population was 8,787, Increasing from 8,432 in 2011, and from 8,243 in 2001,

In 2012, a former Methodist chapel was converted for use as the latest incarnation of Hornsea Town Hall.

== Lost villages ==
=== Hornsea Beck ===
53.915889°N 0.156950°W

Hornsea Beck was a small village or hamlet close to the sea – it is recorded in existence as early as 1367, and had been completely destroyed by the coastal erosion by c. 1747. Losses to the sea of 38 houses are recorded from 1546 to 1609.

=== Hornsea Burton ===
See also § History

Hornsea Burton was located to the south-east of Hornsea Town. The present 'Hornsea Burton Road' leads east to the coast where it stops, but it once continued some half a mile further to Hornsea Burton village, now long since inundated by the sea. By 1840 the remaining western part of the village was depopulated.

=== Northorpe ===
53.924763°N 0.179633°W

Northorpe was located north of Hornsea. The site was completely depopulated sometime between the late 1600s and 1809.

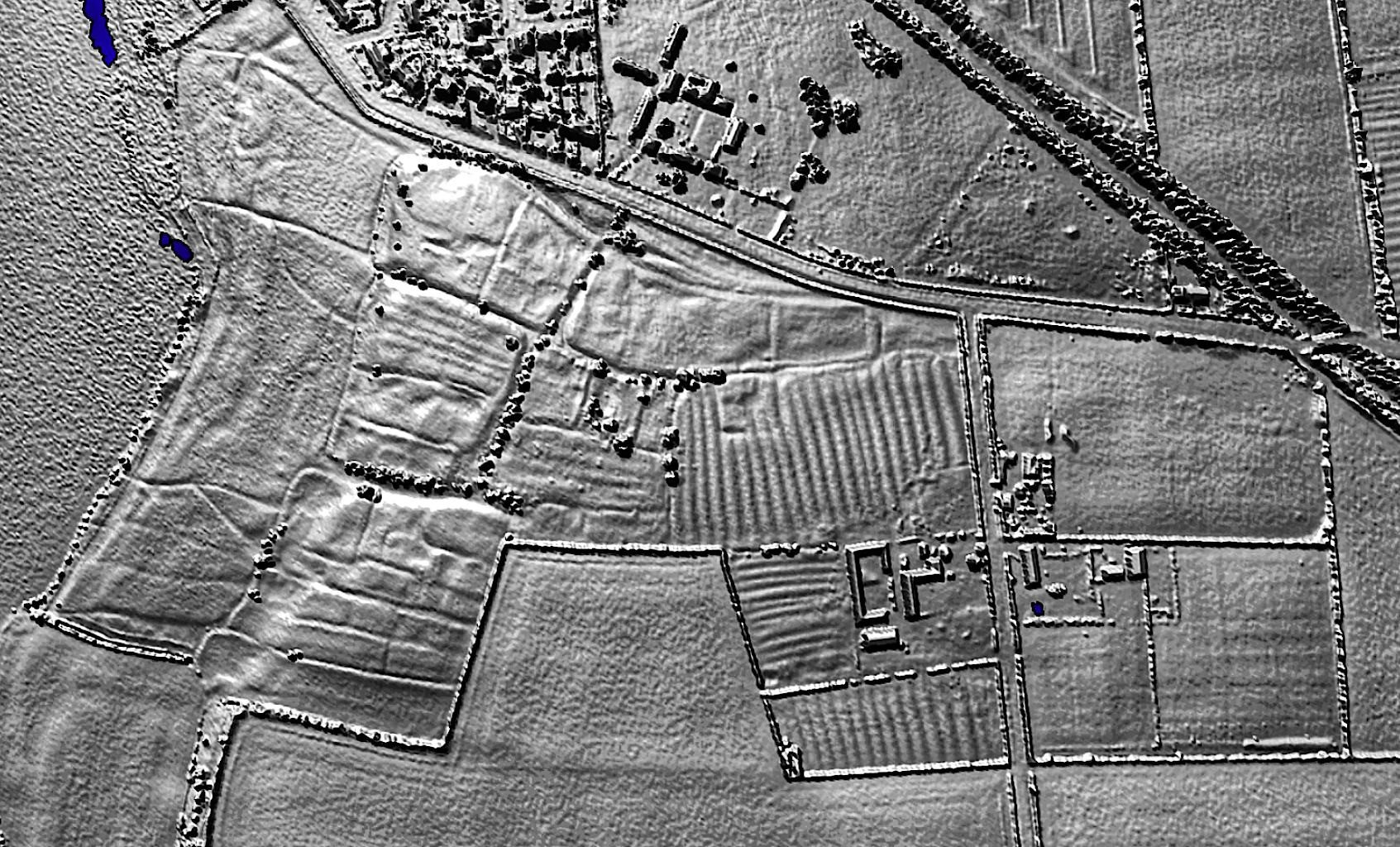
A lidar view of the site of Southorpe village

=== Southorpe ===
53.899910°N 0.185272°W

The village was once a settlement at Southorpe, on the south side of the mere – the village was recorded by the Domesday survey, and existed until the 17th century. By the beginning of the 19th century the village had been abandoned.

== Gallery ==
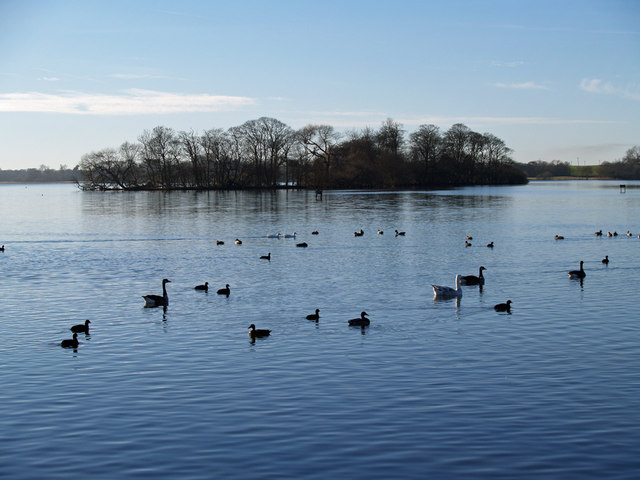
Swan Island on Hornsea Mere (2007)

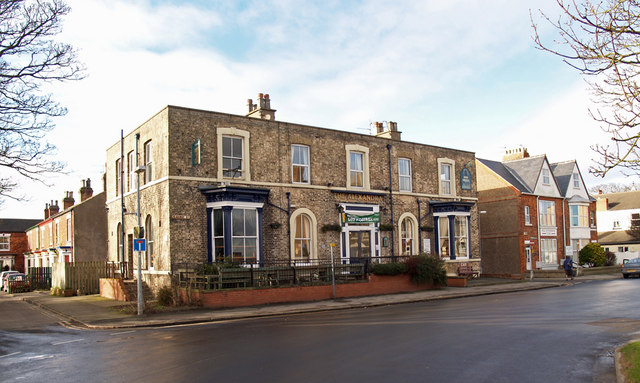
Alexandra Hotel, built 1867 (2007)

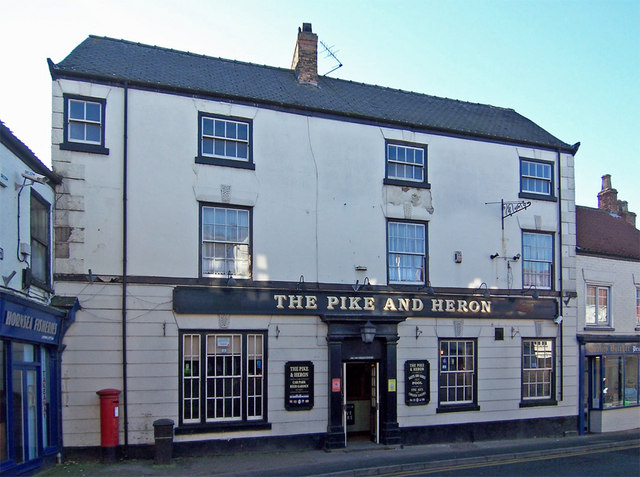
The Pike and Heron, Market Place, built c. 1830 (2007)

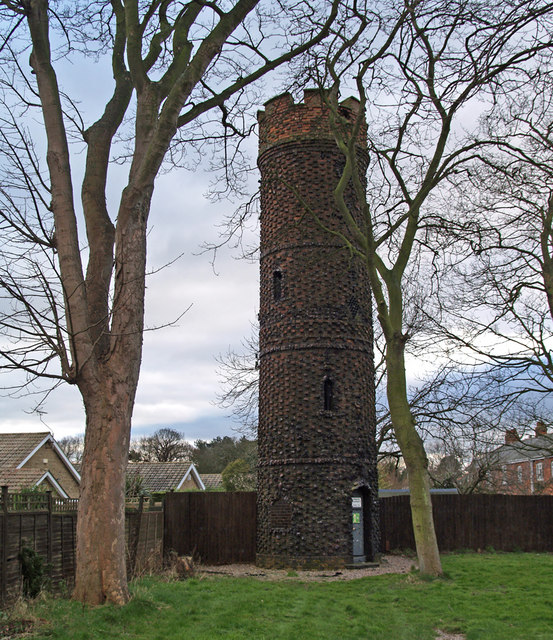
Bettison's Folly, built 1844 (2007)

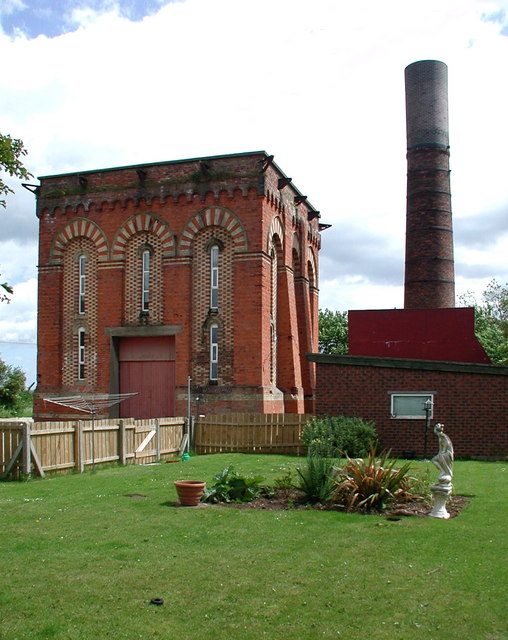
Atwick Road water works, established 1878 (2008)

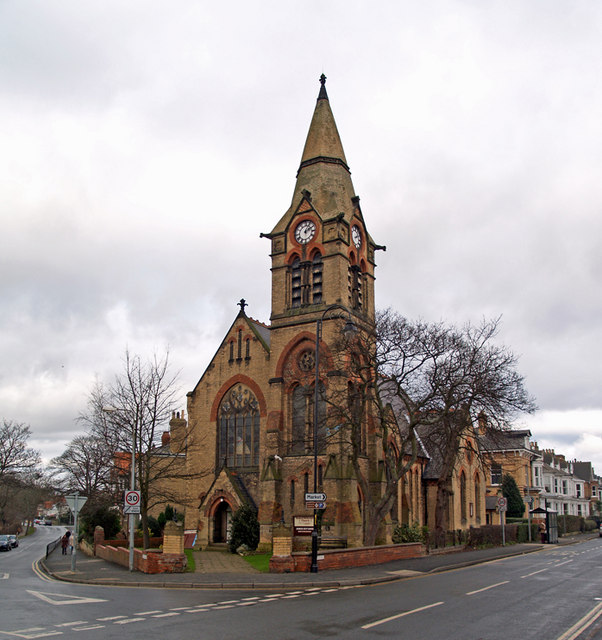
Congregational church, built 1874 (2007)

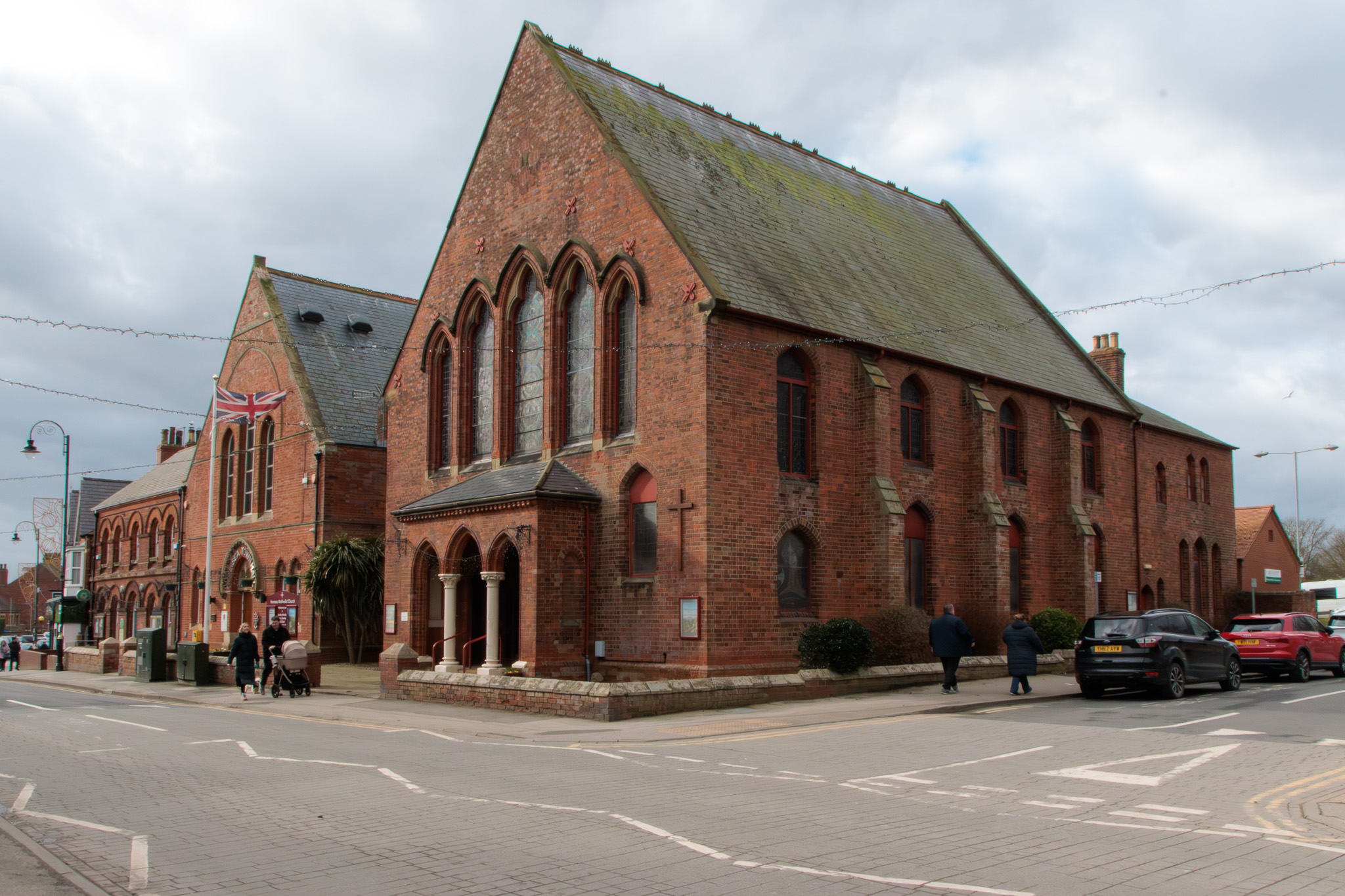
Methodist (Wesleyan) church, built 1870 (2026)

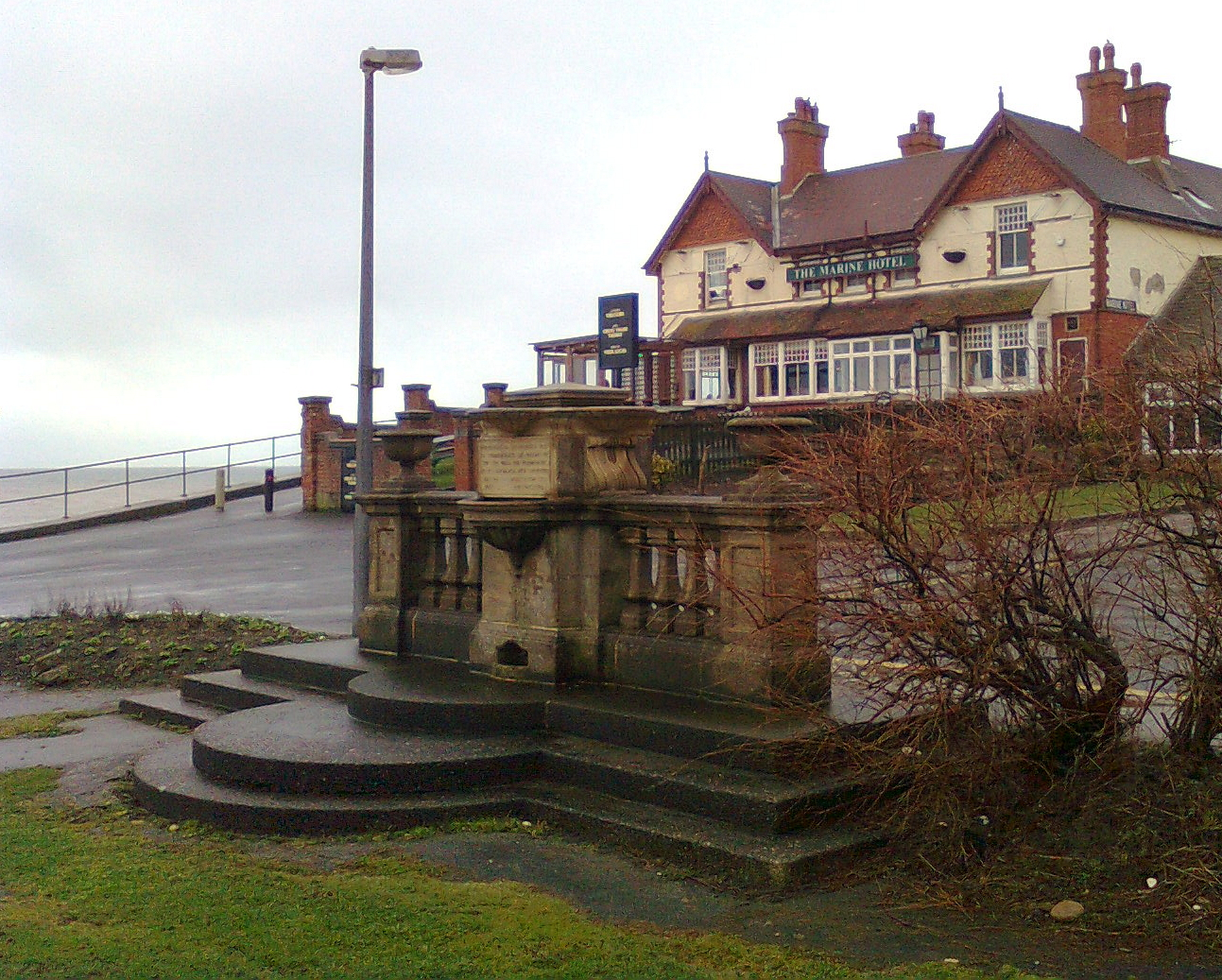
Marine Hotel and Monument commemorating the opening of the seawall and promenade, 6 July 1907 (2010)

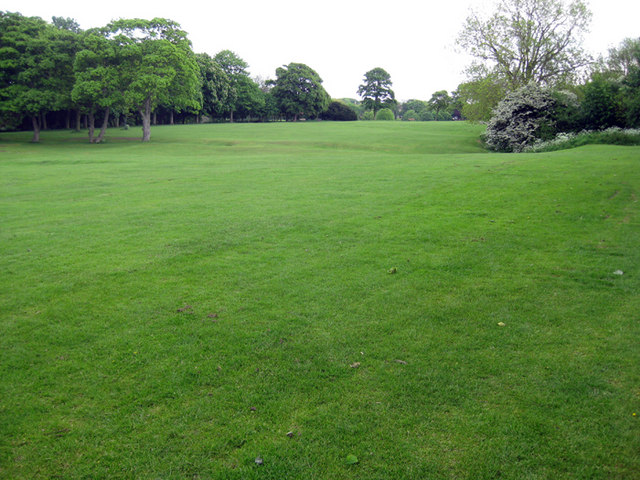
Hall Garth Park, variations in the ground may be former earthworks of a medieval moated site

== Sport ==
Hornsea Cricket Club plays at the Hollis Recreation Ground. Notable former players include Johnny Briggs (England), and Tom Kohler-Cadmore (Worcestershire and Yorkshire).

Hornsea is home to Hornsea Rugby Union Football Club. They play at the Hollis Recreation Ground and are nicknamed the 'Hollismen'. The club was formed in 1923. They currently play in Yorkshire 3 after winning the 2024–25 Yorkshire 4.

Hornsea Town F.C. is an amateur football team who also play at the Hollis Recreation Ground. Their nicknames include 'Town' or 'The Seasiders'. The club plays in the premier division of the Humber Premier League after gaining promotion by winning division one in the 2016–17 season. Hornsea Town has eight teams; including a first team (HPL Premier Div), reserves (East Riding County League), veterans (Hull & District Veterans Football League) and a Sunday team (Hull Men's Sunday Football League).

== Media ==
Local news and television programmes are provided by BBC Yorkshire and Lincolnshire and ITV Yorkshire. Television signals are received from the Belmont TV transmitter.

Hornsea's local radio stations are BBC Radio Humberside, Hits Radio East Yorkshire & North Lincolnshire, Capital Yorkshire, Greatest Hits Radio East Yorkshire, Nation Radio East Yorkshire, and community based station Seaside FM.

The Holderness and Hornsea Gazette and Hornsea Community News are the town's local newspapers.

== Notable people ==
- Johnny Briggs (1862–1902), former England cricketer played at Hornsea CC
- Sonia Dresdel (1909–1976), English actress, born in Hornsea
- Edward John Eyre (1815–1901), English born Australian pioneer, son of a vicar of Hornsea.
- Winifred Holtby (1898–1935), writer, lived for a time on Cliff Road.
- Roger Lonsdale (1934–2022), British literary scholar and academic. Elected a Fellow of the British Academy in 1991, born in Hornsea
- Sheila Mercier (1919–2019), actress, sister to Brian Rix.
- Adrian Rawlins (born 1958), actor, lives in Hornsea.
- Brian Rix (1924–2016), later given the title Baron Rix, of Whitehall, in the City of Westminster and of Hornsea in Yorkshire. He lived in Hornsea as a child, and married Elspet Gray in St Nicholas Church in 1949.
- Joseph Sheard (1813–1883), Mayor of Toronto (1871–72), born in Hornsea
- Edith Tolkien (1889–1971), wife of J. R. R. Tolkien, lodged at 1 Bank Terrace, Hornsea, while her husband was stationed at Thirtle Bridge
- James Opie Urmson (1915-2012), Oxford philosopher and classicist, born in Hornsea.

== Arms ==
Coat of arms of Hornsea
Notes Granted 24 June 1955, to the Hornsea Urban District Council. Crest Issuant from a Mural Crown Or a Sun in splendour Gules surmounted of a Rose Argent barbed and seeded proper; Mantled Gules doubled Or. Escutcheon Or three Bars wavy Azure issuant from the base a Sun in splendour Gules a Chief wavy Sable thereon a Fountain between two Roses Argent barbed and seeded proper. Motto HEALTH AND HAPPINESS

== See also ==
- Hornsea Wind Farm, 21st century North Sea wind farm under development off the English coast
- Withernsea, Holderness coastal resort
- Hornsea Cottage Hospital, local health facility
- Listed buildings in Hornsea
