= St Nicholas' Church, Hornsea =

Church in Hornsea, East Riding of Yorkshire, England

Coordinates: 53.9110°N 0.1732°W

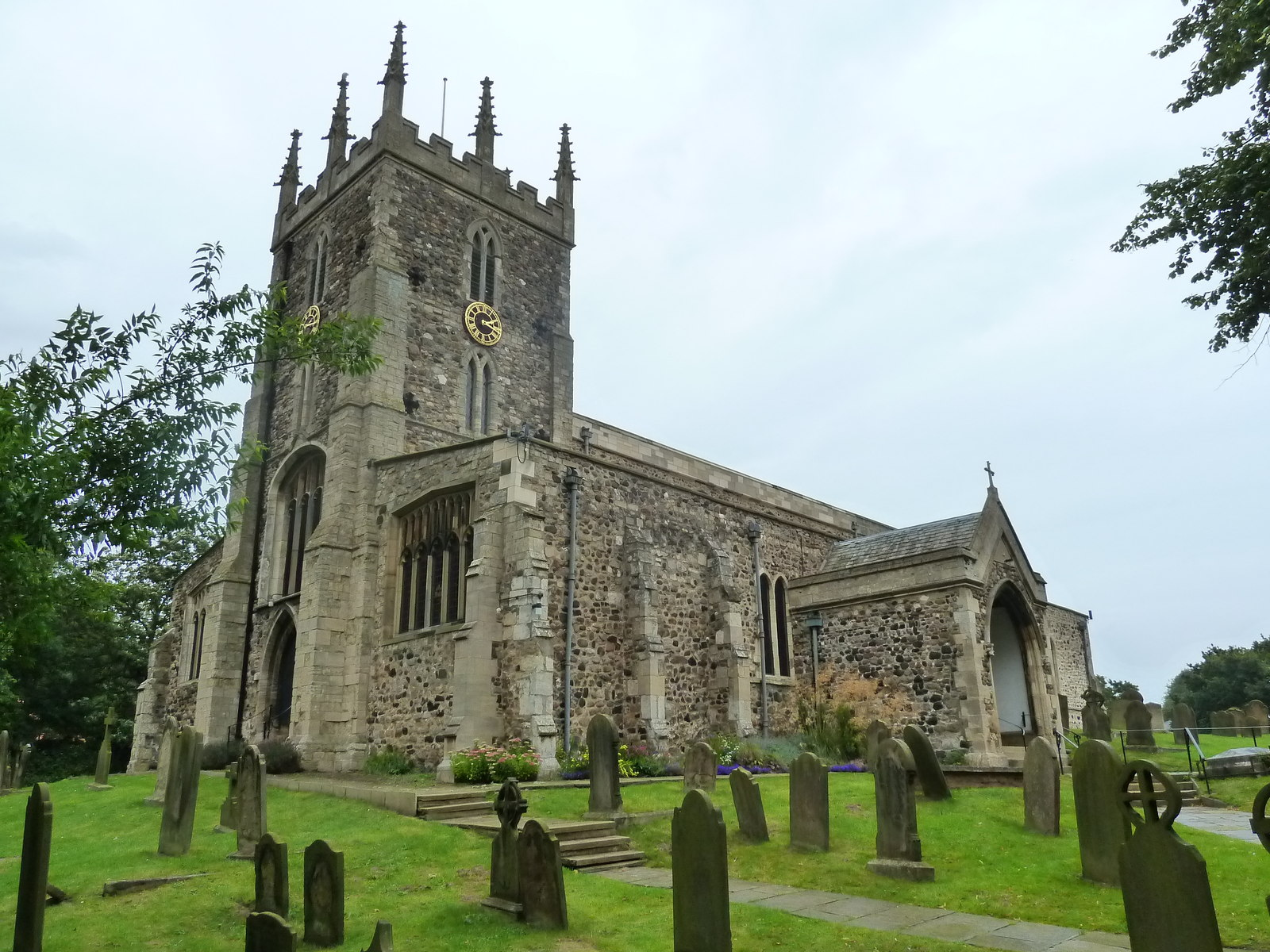
The church, in 2012

St Nicholas' Church is the parish church of Hornsea, a town in the East Riding of Yorkshire, in England.

A church in Hornsea was recorded in the Domesday Book. The oldest part of the current building is the nave, which was built in the 13th century, while the tower was completed later in the century. Battlements were added to the tower in the 14th century. In the 15th century a clerestory was constructed, the west window was replaced, as were the windows at the east end. The tower was in poor repair by 1693, and in 1714 its wooden spire blew down. The roof of the church was largely destroyed during a storm in 1732 but was replaced. The north aisle of the nave was restored in 1845, and the remainder of the church was restored by George Gilbert Scott between 1865 and 1867. Further work was undertaken between 1899 and 1907, including the construction of a vestry. The church was grade I listed in 1965.

The church is built of cobbles with freestone dressings, and consists of a nave with a clerestory, north and south aisles, a south porch, a chancel with north and south aisled chapels, beneath which is a crypt, and a west tower embraced by the aisles. The tower has three stages, a chamfered plinth, angle buttresses, a pointed chamfered west doorway with a hood mould and a five-light window with Perpendicular tracery. Above are chamfered string courses, clock faces, pointed openings with Y-tracery and hood moulds, and an embattled parapet with eight crocketed pinnacles. Inside, there is an early-13th century octagonal font, 13th-century effigies brought from St Giles' Church, Goxhill and St Mary Magdalene and St Helena's Church, Nunkeeling, and an alabaster tomb chest dating from 1430.

== See also ==
- Grade I listed buildings in the East Riding of Yorkshire
- Listed buildings in Hornsea
