= List of museums in the East Riding of Yorkshire =

This list of museums in the East Riding of Yorkshire, England contains museums which are defined for this context as institutions (including nonprofit organizations, government entities, and private businesses) that collect and care for objects of cultural, artistic, scientific, or historical interest and make their collections or related exhibits available for public viewing. Also included are non-profit art galleries and university art galleries. Museums that exist only in cyberspace (i.e., virtual museums) are not included.

== Museums ==
Name	Image	Town/City	Region	Type	Summary
Arctic Corsair		Hull	East Riding	Maritime	Deep sea trawler museum ship
Bayle Museum		Bridlington	East Riding	Local	local history, located in the former gatehouse to the Bridlington Priory
Beverley Guildhall		Beverley	East Riding	History	historic guildhall with medieval to 18th century rooms, furnishings, display of ceremonial silver and pewter, local history exhibits
Bondville Model Village		Sewerby	East Riding	History	information, over 200 miniature buildings on a 1-acre site
Breighton Aerodrome		Breighton	East Riding	Aviation	classic aircraft collection of the Real Aeroplane Company and the Real Aeroplane Club, open for members, located at RAF Breighton
Bridlington Harbour Heritage Museum		Bridlington	East Riding	Maritime	information, 1912 traditional sailing coble, local maritime artifacts
Burton Agnes Hall		Burton Agnes	East Riding	Historic house	Elizabethan manor house with French impressionist paintings, contemporary furniture, tapestries and other modern artwork, gardens, also Norman Manor House operated by English Heritage
Burton Constable Hall		Skirlaugh	East Riding	Historic house	Elizabethan country house with 18th- and 19th-century interiors, fine furniture, paintings and sculpture, and an 18th-century ‘cabinet of curiosities' which contains fossils, natural history specimens and scientific instruments
Dinostar		Hull	East Riding	Natural history	dinosaur recreations, fossils
Ferens Art Gallery		Hull	East Riding	Art	Municipal art gallery
Flamborough Head Lighthouse		Flamborough	East Riding	Maritime	Lighthouse museum
Fort Paull		Paull	East Riding	Military	Mid 19th century gun battery
Goole Museum		Goole	East Riding	Multiple	local history, art, located on the first floor of the Goole Library
Hands on History Museum		Hull	East Riding	Local	local history, Egyptian gallery, located in the former Hull Grammar School
Hedon Museum		Hedon	East Riding	Local	local history, household items, community art gallery
Holderness museums		Holderness	East Riding	Local	local oral history
Hornsea Museum		Hornsea	East Riding	Multiple	Period rooms of a farmhouse, Hornsea Pottery, photographs, tools, household and agricultural devices, Victorian street scene of shops, schoolrooms, local industry and history
Hull and East Riding Museum		Hull	East Riding	Archaeology	artifacts and recreations of Iron Age, Roman and Viking life
Hull Maritime Museum		Hull	East Riding	Maritime	Arctic whaling, maritime trade, fishing industry
Humber Car Museum (Allan Marshall)		Hull	East Riding	Automobile	Collection of Humber cars, closing 2018
RAF Holmpton		Holmpton	East Riding	Military	Cold War-era underground nuclear bunker and radar operations centre
Sewerby Hall		Sewerby	East Riding	Multiple	Early 18th-century house with period rooms, local history and art exhibits, gardens
Skidby Windmill		Skidby	East Riding	Multiple	19th century windmill, houses the Museum of East Riding Rural Life with displays of agriculture, trades and rural household artifacts
Sledmere House		Sledmere	East Riding	Historic house	Georgian country house with Chippendale, Sheraton and French furnishings, fine pictures, military museum about the First World War wagon reserves, gardens, set within a park designed by Capability Brown
Southburn Archaeological Museum		Southburn	East Riding	Archaeology	Roman British artifacts
Spurn Lightship		Hull	East Riding	Maritime	Lightvessel museum ship
Stewart's Burnby Hall Gardens and Museum		Pocklington	East Riding	Multiple	Includes the United Kingdom's national collection of hardy water lilies, collection of hunting trophies and travel memorabilia
Streetlife Museum of Transport		Hull	East Riding	Transport	Antique cars, horse-drawn carriages and objects relating to local public transport
Treasure House		Beverley	East Riding	Multiple	Includes the Beverley Art Gallery, local history displays, library and archive
Wilberforce House		Hull	East Riding	Historic house	Home and life of abolitionist William Wilberforce
Withernsea Lighthouse Museum		Withernsea	East Riding	Local	Former lighthouse with local history exhibits

== Defunct museums ==
- Beside the Seaside Museum, Bridlington, seeking new location
- Museum of Army Transport, Beverley
- Old Penny Memories, Bridlington
- Yorkshire Waterways Museum, Goole

== See also ==
- Tourist attractions in the East Riding of Yorkshire
