= Marion Campbell (disambiguation) =

Marion Campbell is a former American football player.

Marion Campbell may also refer to:

- Marion Campbell (archaeologist), Scottish amateur archaeologist
- Marion Campbell (statistician), Scottish medical statistician
- Marion May Campbell, Australian writer
- Dorothy Marion Campbell, English potter known as Marion Campbell
