= Clappison =

Clappison is a surname. Notable people with the surname include:

- Henry Gordon Clappison (1898–1977), Canadian World War I flying ace
- James Clappison (born 1956), British barrister and politician
- John Clappison (1937–2013), English ceramic and glass designer
