= Scarborough Pottery =

Scarborough Pottery was instigated in 1964 by Peter Hough who had originally attended Scarborough Art College. After attending college in Manchester, he then taught art in Accrington and Guildford before returning to Scarborough to set up the Pottery.

The pottery used a variety of venues in the Scarborough and North Yorkshire area, in Newborough, Scalby Mills, Gladstone Lane, Scalby and finally Laundry Road in Filey. They specialised in novelty and souvenir items and their products can still be found in antique centres, fairs and shops all over Britain.

Scarborough Pottery closed in 1983 following a down-turn in the ceramics industry.

The nearby Hornsea Pottery donated moulds to Peter Hough and many of Hornsea's designers, modellers and technicians (including Alan Luckham and Mike Walker) contributed their time and expertise to the smaller enterprise. A number of designs by John Clappison were adapted for use at Scarborough Pottery.

Many collectors of Hornsea Pottery also collect Scarborough due to this interrelation although it is often difficult to identify Scarborough Pottery, particularly as very few items were marked.
