= Listed buildings in Flamborough =

Flamborough is a civil parish in the county of the East Riding of Yorkshire, England. It contains twelve listed buildings that are recorded in the National Heritage List for England. Of these, two are listed at Grade II*, the middle of the three grades, and the others are at Grade II, the lowest grade. The parish contains the village of Flamborough and the surrounding countryside, including the coastal area of Flamborough Head. The listed buildings include a church, the ruins of a fortified manor house, houses, a farmhouse, a barn, a public house, a vicarage. a lighthouse and associated structures, a tower never used as a lighthouse, and a war memorial.

== Key ==
Grade	Criteria
II*	Particularly important buildings of more than special interest
II	Buildings of national importance and special interest

== Buildings ==
Name and location	Photograph	Date	Notes	Grade
St Oswald's Church; 54.11265°N 0.12578°W		c. 1100	The church has been altered and extended through the centuries, it was largely rebuilt in 1864–69, and C. Hodgson Fowler added the south porch in 1892 and the tower in 1897. Most of the church is built in stone, the north aisle is in cobble, and the roofs are in slate. It consists of a nave with a clerestory, north and south aisles, a south porch, a chancel with a clerestory, and a west tower. The tower has three stages, a plinth, string courses, clasping buttresses, a three-light west window, two-light bell openings, and an embattled parapet with crocketed corner pinnacles. On the south front is a canopied niche with a sculpture.	II*
Flamborough Castle; 54.11412°N 0.12602°W		Mid-14th century	The remains of the fortified manor house are in chalk, and are the remnants of a square tower. Three walls remain, rising to a height of about 20 feet (6.1 m), and they contain a doorway, and traces of a vaulted undercroft.	II
The Old Lighthouse; 54.11801°N 0.08962°W		1674	The building is in chalk, with repairs in red and brown brick. It consists of an octagonal tower with four stages, a brick parapet with a low roof, and moulded string courses between the stages. There are two pointed doorways, one with a red brick surround, the other blocked and with a yellow brick surround, and above are rectangular windows. The building was never used as a lighthouse.	II*
Carr Farmhouse; 54.11277°N 0.12737°W		Early 18th century	The farmhouse is in rendered chalkstone, and has a pantile roof. There is one storey and attics, and four bays. The doorway has a plain surround, and the windows are horizontally sliding sashes in moulded architraves. There are two sloped roof dormers with similar windows.	II
The Manor House; 54.11384°N 0.12420°W	—	Early 18th century	The house, which was refronted and remodelled in the early 19th century, is rendered, with a chalk wall at the rear, on a plinth, with stone dressings, rusticated quoins, and a hipped roof. There are two storeys, five bays and a rear wing and outshut. The central doorway has reeded pilasters, a moulded surround, a rectangular fanlight in panelled reveals and soffit, a panelled frieze, and a shallow moulded cornice. The windows are sashes with channelled wedge lintels.	II
Rose and Crown Inn; 54.118325°N 0.12261°W		Mid-18th century	The public house is rendered, and has stone dressings, sprocketed eaves, and a pantile roof with a raised gable on the right, kneelers and a terracotta poppyhead finial. There are two storeys and four bays. On the front is a narrow rectangular fanlight, the windows are sashes, and all the openings have channelled wedge lintels and raised keystones.	II
Barn, Ocean View Farm; 54.11413°N 0.10665°W		1772	The barn is in red brick on a plinth, with a stepped brick eaves cornice, and a pantile roof with tumbled-in brick to the raised gables with kneelers. There are two storeys and four bays. The barn contains doors under relieving segmental arches, a round-headed door, and slit vents, some spelling out the date.	II
6 High Street; 54.11745°N 0.12368°W	—	Late 18th to early 19th century	A small rendered house with a stepped eaves cornice and a pantile roof. There are two storeys and two bays. The doorway has a plain surround, and the windows are bow windows with wooden architraves.	II
Flamborough Head Lighthouse; 54.11630°N 0.08281°W		1806	The lighthouse, which was raised in 1925, is in rendered brick, with stone dressings. It consists of a conical tower about 27 metres (89 ft) to the balcony. The lighthouse has a high chamfered plinth, casement windows in stone surrounds, with low pediments over lintels. Above is a deep moulded cornice under a cast iron balcony with moulded newels and mushroom finials, on which is a lantern with a weathervane.	II
Keepers' house and offices, Flamborough Head Lighthouse; 54.11639°N 0.08264°W		1806	The building is in rendered brick on a chamfered plinth, with stone dressings, a stepped cornice and a flat roof. There are two storeys, five bays and a rear wing containing the entrance to the lighthouse. The double door has a fanlight, above it is plaque with a crest, and the windows are sashes.	II
The Vicarage; 54.11332°N 0.12575°W		1843	The vicarage is in light brown brick, with stone dressings, a timber eaves cornice, deep eaves on shaped brackets, and a hipped slate roof. There are two storeys, a square plan, fronts of three bays, and outshuts on the left and at the rear. The central bay on the front is recessed, and contains a doorway with a plain surround and a rectangular fanlight. The windows are sashes, those on the ground floor in arched recesses with lintel bands.	II
War memorial 54.11418°N 0.12492°W		1918	The war memorial stands in an enclosure by the roadside. It consists of a plain stone cross on a double plinth. On the base of the shaft is an inscription, and on the plinth are dates and the names of those lost in the two World Wars.	II
