= St Oswald's Church, Flamborough =

Church in Flamborough, East Riding of Yorkshire, England

Coordinates: 54°06′46″N 0°07′33″W

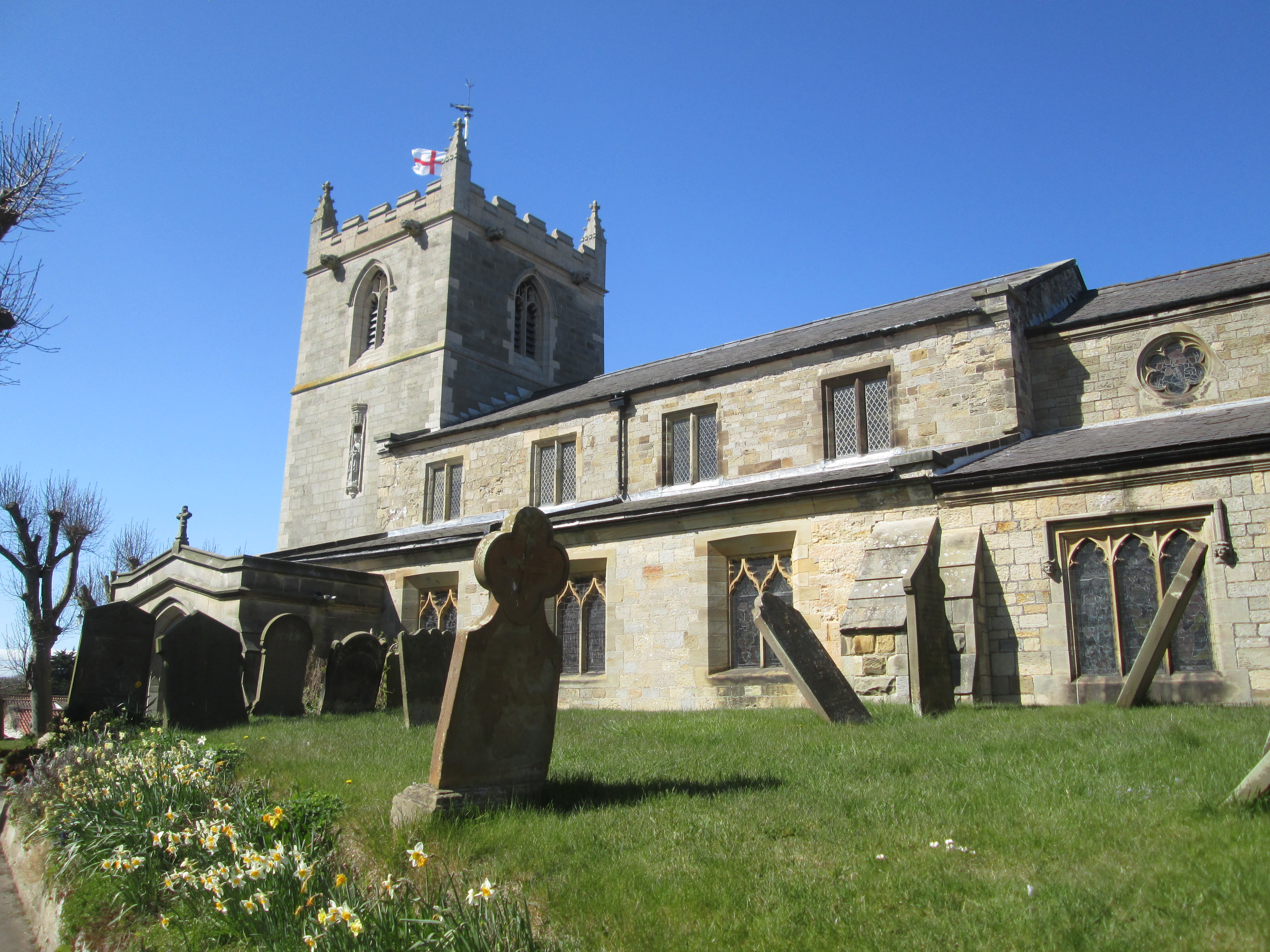
The church, in 2021

St Oswald's Church is the parish church of Flamborough, a village in the East Riding of Yorkshire, in England.

The church was built about 1100, from which period the chancel arch and some walling survive. It was largely rebuilt in the late mediaeval period, in the Perpendicular Gothic style. By the mid-19th century, it consisted of a nave and chancel, both with north and south aisles, but had no tower, only a wooden belfry. Most of the church was rebuilt in 1864, to a design by Richard George Smith. A porch was added in 1893, and a tower in 1896, both designed by C. Hodgson Fowler. The building was grade II* listed in 1966.

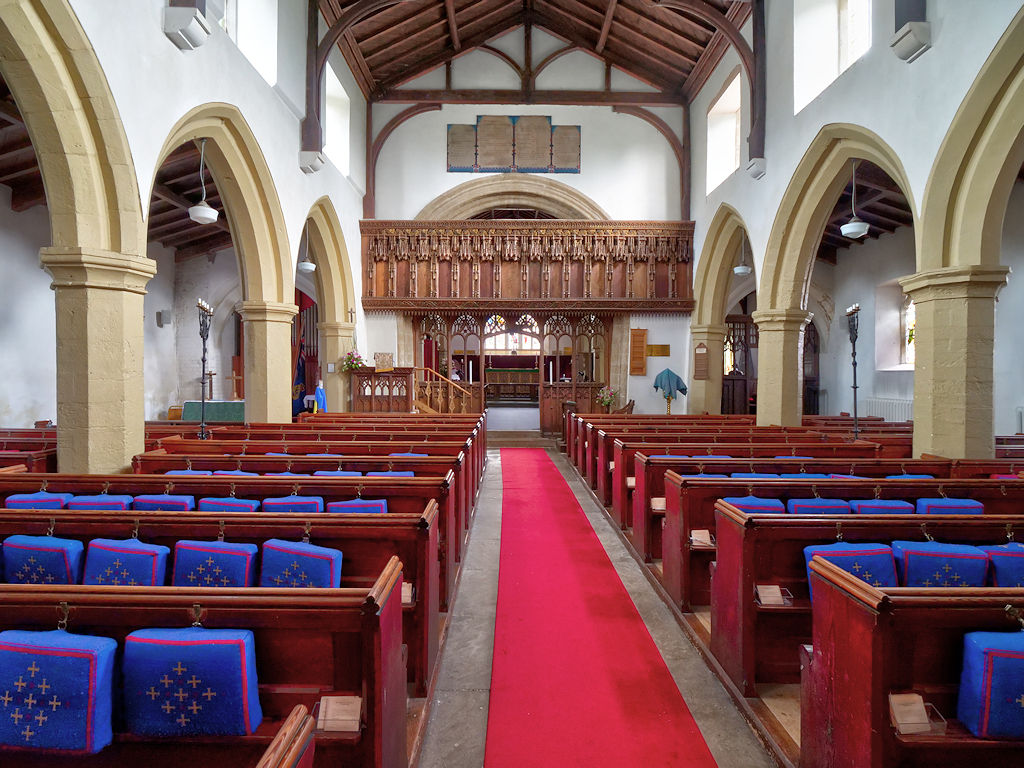
Interior view

Most of the church is built in stone, the north aisle is in cobble, and the roofs are in slate. It consists of a nave with a clerestory, north and south aisles, a south porch, a chancel with a clerestory, and a west tower. The tower has three stages, a plinth, string courses, clasping buttresses, a three-light west window, two-light bell openings, and an embattled parapet with crocketed corner pinnacles. On the south front is a canopied niche with a sculpture.

Inside, there is a 15th-century chancel screen which probably came from Bridlington Priory, and a rood loft above with 15 niches with canopies, though all the statues have been removed. There is a 12th-century font with a lozenge ornament.

== See also ==
- Grade II* listed buildings in the East Riding of Yorkshire
- Listed buildings in Flamborough
