= Flamborough Castle =

Motte-and-bailey castle in the East Riding of Yorkshire, England

- East Riding of Yorkshire, England
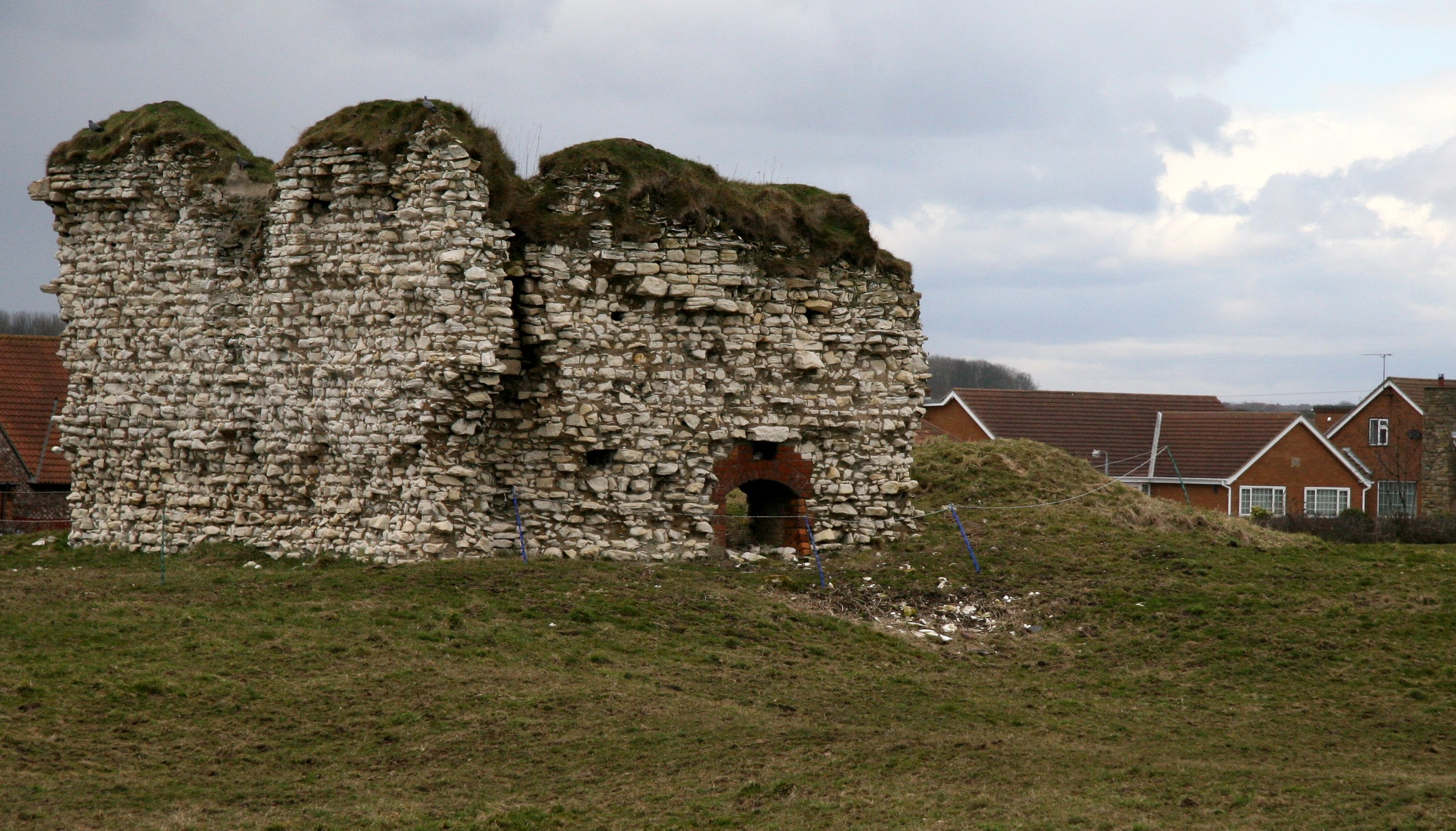
- Flamborough Castle's Danish Tower in 2010

Site information
- Type: Manor house
- Open to the public: Available to view from a public pathway

Location
- Shown within the East Riding of Yorkshire
- Location within East Riding of Yorkshire
- Coordinates: 54.114125°N 0.126081°W
- Grid reference: grid reference TA226702

Site history
- Built: c. 1090 (original structure); 1351–52 (current structure)
- Built by: Marmaduke Constable
- In use: 12 February 1352 – 1537
- Materials: Chalk
- Demolished: c. 1573

Flamborough Castle, also known as the Danish Tower, is a Grade II listed Medieval manor house in Flamborough, East Riding of Yorkshire which has partial ruins existing today.

== History ==
The first fortified manor house that existed on the site was built around 1090 by the Constable family, and it is mentioned between 1180 and 1193 when a constabularius existed on the site.

The surviving Farnborough Castle structure was built on the site of an oratory constructed in 1319. Construction began on 12 February 1352 by Marmaduke Constable (c. 1300 – 1378) after he obtained a licence to crenellate from King Edward III on 24 May 1351. The main tower of the Castle was the Danish Tower, and the building was in use by the Constable family until it was abandoned when Sir Robert Constable was executed on 6 July 1537, causing his family to forfeit Flamborough Castle among thirty-four other manors to the King. It was in ruins by c. 1540 until some repairs were carried out in 1543 but the building was largely demolished by c. 1573 when the kitchen was removed.

Although the Constable family were able to regain their Flamborough estate from Queen Elizabeth I in 1582, they did not live there as it was in a state of ruin. They sold the Castle in 1636 and the Strickland family purchased it in 1656. The ruins of Flamborough Castle were then in use as a cattle barn by 1798, and was used as a cattle barn until at least 1892. Stones from the castle were stolen over time to construct later buildings in Flamborough with evidence of lime kilns being built on the site in the form of surviving earthworks.

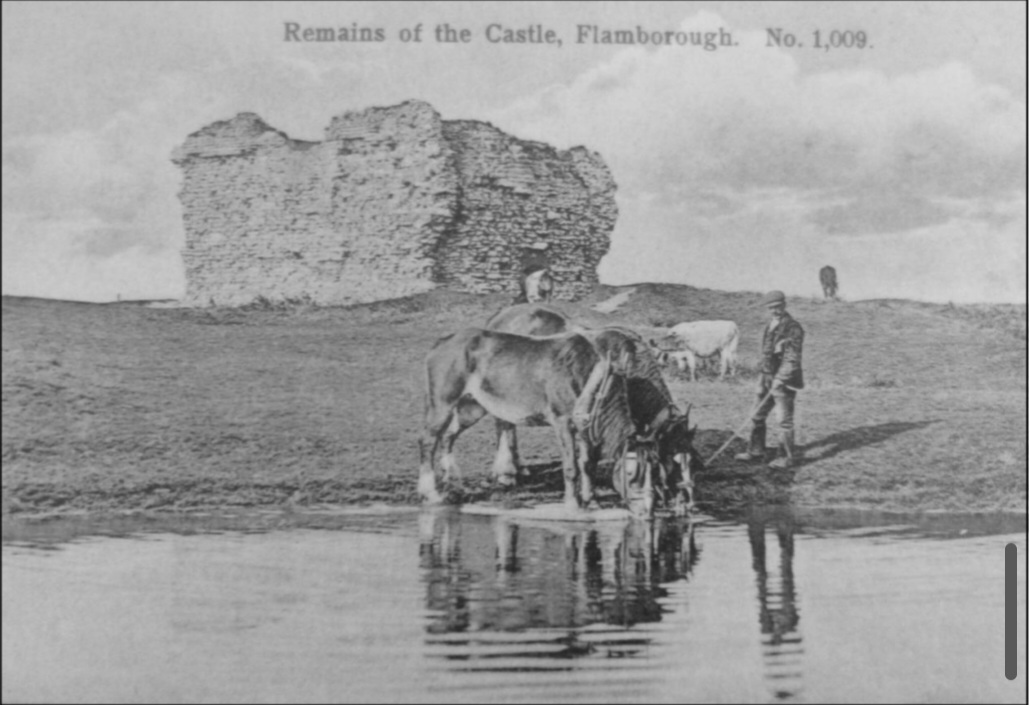
Flamborough Castle between 1900–20, before the north wall collapsed

The north wall collapsed no later than 1925, and the vaulted chamber collapsed before 1971.

== Excavation ==
The earthworks surrounding the castle were first excavated by J. R. Earnshaw in c. 1964, and Flamborough Castle was excavated again and also partially repaired between 2017 and 2018.

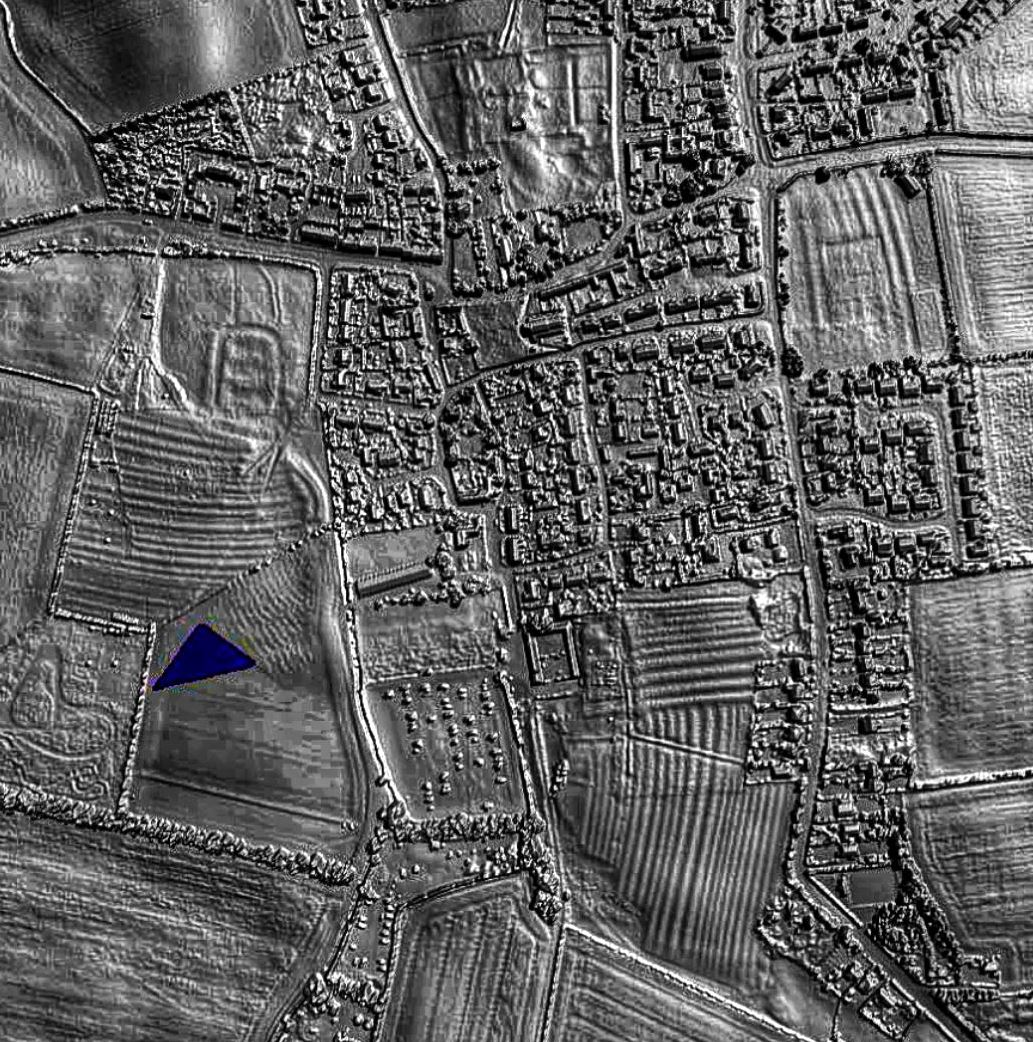
A lidar view of the castle (centre top) with a historic landscape to the south including ridge and furrow.

== Description ==
In 1537, John Leyland visited Flamborough Castle. He mentioned that the building included a tower, a hall, a 'great parlour', a 'lord's parlour', a chapel, a court house, a mill house, and a great barn.

Today, alongside the surrounding earthworks, three walls of the Danish Tower survive and they only stand to 4 metres (13 ft) tall.

== See also ==
- Listed buildings in Flamborough
