= Marion Campbell (statistician) =

Scottish medical statistician

Marion Kay Campbell is a Scottish medical statistician, clinical trialist, and academic administrator who is the dean of research for life sciences and medicine and a professor of health services research at the University of Aberdeen.

== Life ==
Campbell completed a BSc in statistics with honours, a MSc in statistics, and a PhD in public health from the University of Aberdeen.

Campbell worked in operational research and the statistics of medical audits at the National Health Service. In 1993, she returned to her alma mater, the University of Aberdeen where she works in the health services research unit. She is a medical statistician and clinical trialist who serves as a professor of health services research. In 2007, she became the director of the unit and dean of research for life sciences and medicine in 2015. As of 2023, she is the vice principal for research. Campbell is a fellow of the Academy of Medical Sciences (2023) and the Royal Society of Edinburgh.
