= Hornsea Pottery =

Former pottery manufacturer in the East Riding of Yorkshire, England

The Hornsea Pottery Company Limited
- Type: Pottery Manufacturer and Leisure Park
- Industry: Wholesale and retail pottery.
- Founded: 1949
- Defunct: 2000
- Fate: Receivership
- Headquarters: Hornsea, England
- Key people: Colin Rawson, Desmond Rawson, John Clappison
- Products: Tableware and fancy goods. On site leisure services.
- Number of employees: Maximum 700
- Subsidiaries: Hornsea Pottery Leisure Park

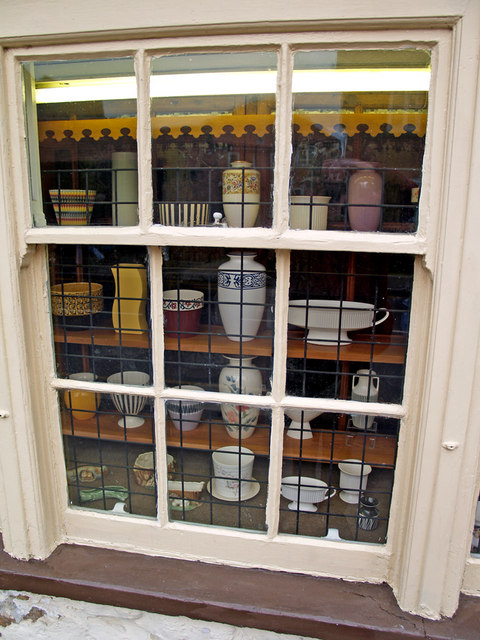
Hornsea Museum — Pottery Window

Hornsea Pottery was a business located in the coastal town of Hornsea in the East Riding of Yorkshire, England. They specialized in tableware with elegant contemporary designs.

The pottery was founded in 1949, in Hornsea, East Riding of Yorkshire at 124 Newbegin, which is where the Food Shop is situated today, by brothers Colin and Desmond Rawson with funding from local business man, Philip Clappison. The factory's earliest pieces were mostly designed by Colin Rawson. The products sold well and the pottery moved to larger premises at the Old Hall and took on its first employee in 1950.

Expansion of the business in the 1950s brought moves to larger sites in Hornsea. A second factory in Lancaster opened in 1974. In 1984, the company struggled and was bought out. Despite its difficulties, the factory continued to produce tableware and ornaments until April 2000 when it went into receivership.

As part of the asset sales during receivership the design rights to the successful Taunton range of table wares was acquired by Poole Pottery. The remainder of the designs, patterns and Intellectual Property rights were sold to Mainscore Ltd and are now owned by Hornsea Potteries Intellectual Properties USA LLC.

In 2008, Hornsea Museum opened a permanent exhibition of Hornsea Pottery. The V & A in London has numerous Hornsea Pottery items in its permanent collection.

== History ==
=== Early years ===
In 1949, Desmond and Colin Rawson started a business making plaster of Paris models to sell as souvenirs to tourists who were visiting the seaside town of Hornsea. Both had attended the Batley College of Art but they had no pottery-making experience. They worked in the scullery of their kitchen at 4 Victoria Avenue in the town. Initial funding came from a friend and local business man, Philip Clappison. After the purchase of a small kiln, they started working with clay. Additional funding was received from Charles Wright, a retired Morecambe hotelier, whose son, Micheal Wright, was working with Desmond on early products. Desmond Rawson's father-in-law, Henry Knowles, a solicitor in Morecambe, provided not only cash investment but all legal services for the rest of his life.

Their products sold well and by 1950 they took on their first employee and moved to larger premises at The Old Hall in the Hornsea Market Place. Robert (Bob) Hindle, Desmond's brother-in-law, joined the company and provided additional share funding, and his 'straight dealing' policy provided the company with an excellent sales directorship for over 20 years.

In 2025, Hornsea School & Language College are creating a performance based around the history of Hornsea, including the history of the Pottery.

=== Edenfield site ===
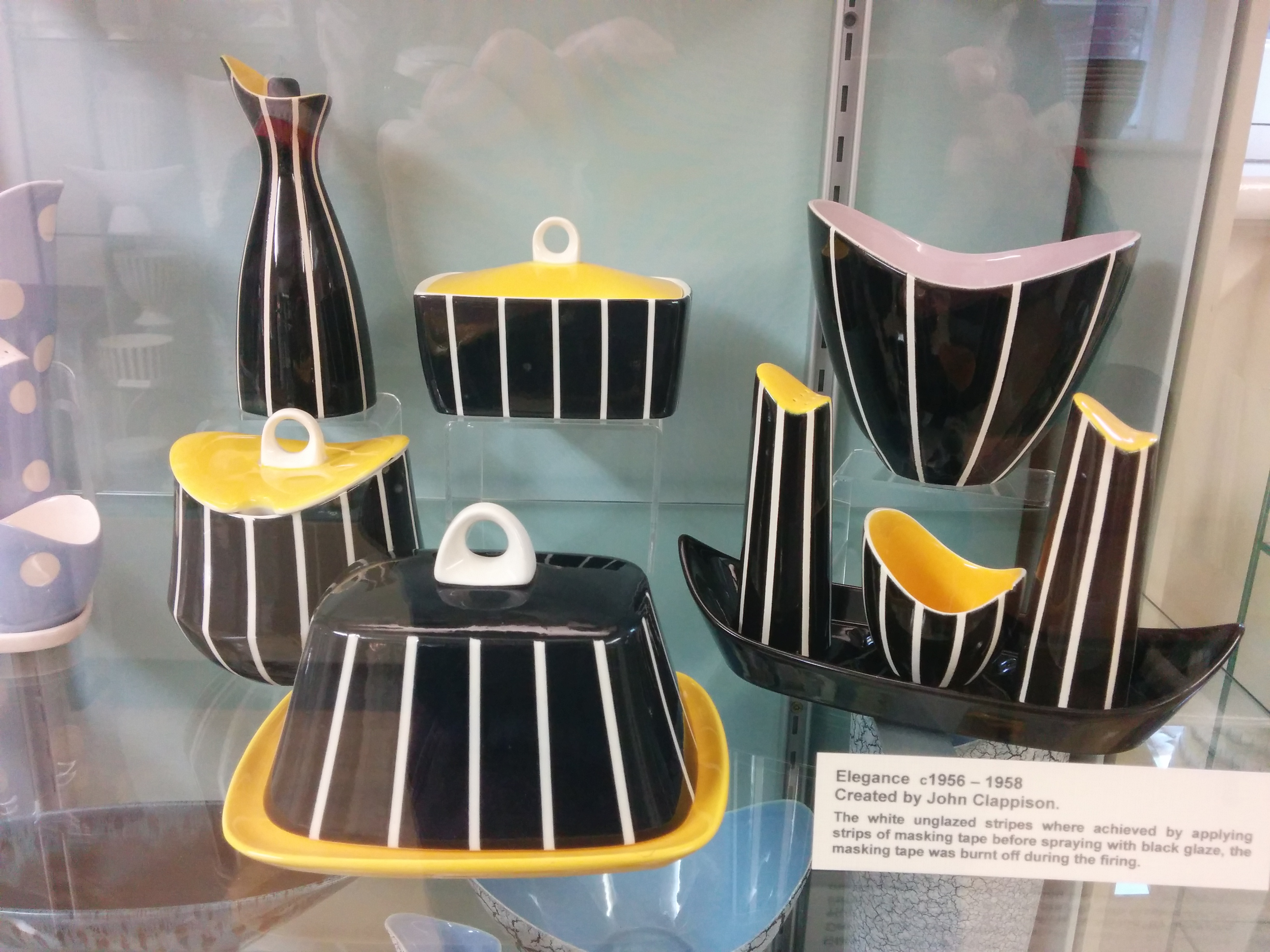
Hornsea "Elegance" pattern, designed by John Clappison.

In the mid-1950s, the Rawson brothers started to recognise the potential of Philip's son, John Clappison, a student at Hull College of Art who produced the stylish, contemporary Elegance range of wares which are much in demand with collectors today. In 1954, the business moved to the site of the defunct Hornsea Brick and Tile Works. At this time the Pottery also employed other noted designers such as Dorothy Marion Campbell and Alan Luckham as modeller. In 1967, the factory started to produce full ranges of tableware, the first being the John Clappison-designed Heirloom, followed by his Saffron and Bronte patterns. In the 1970s, the Queensbury-Hunt partnership became involved in Hornsea tableware design, and their Contrast and Concept ranges proved popular. Though innovative, these products were not always practical in use. By 1974, the Edenfield Works employed 250 people and turned out three million pieces a year.

From the mid-1950s, the Hornsea Pottery business became more diverse. Tourist activities began with factory tours, then added more activities for families with children. These included a model village, birds of prey exhibition, car museum, a large adventure playground in the style of a wooden fort, remote control boats and go-karts. For adults, there were cafés, the Hornsea Pottery shop and factory tour and, towards the end of the factory's lifetime, a number of shops which turned the site into an American-style outdoor factory outlet mall, selling clothing and other items at reduced prices.

=== Lancaster site ===
During the 1960s, Hornsea Pottery had become the biggest employer in the town and Hornsea Pottery had become so successful that the need for increased production called for expansion. Plans for further development at Hornsea were frustrated by local government objections, so locations outside the town were sought. A number of sites for the second factory were considered and Lancaster was chosen and the new 'Pottery in a Garden' opened in 1974. Unfortunately, there were many teething problems and it took factory workers longer to train to the higher standards required for the newly introduced brown Vitramic body. Despite this shaky start the first three ranges produced at the Lancaster factory received Design Centre Awards and with them Hornsea Pottery enhanced its worldwide reputation. The Lancaster site only lasted for twelve years. Despite overcoming the early difficulties and its eventual profit making, it could not stand up against the economic climate of the time. It closed in 1988.

=== Heyday ===
Hornsea tablewares were sold worldwide for over 20 years and all tableware ranges were accepted for inclusion on the Design Centre Index before entering production. At one stage production of the Heirloom tableware soon could not keep up with the demand and department stores had to be limited on a quota basis.

=== Decline ===
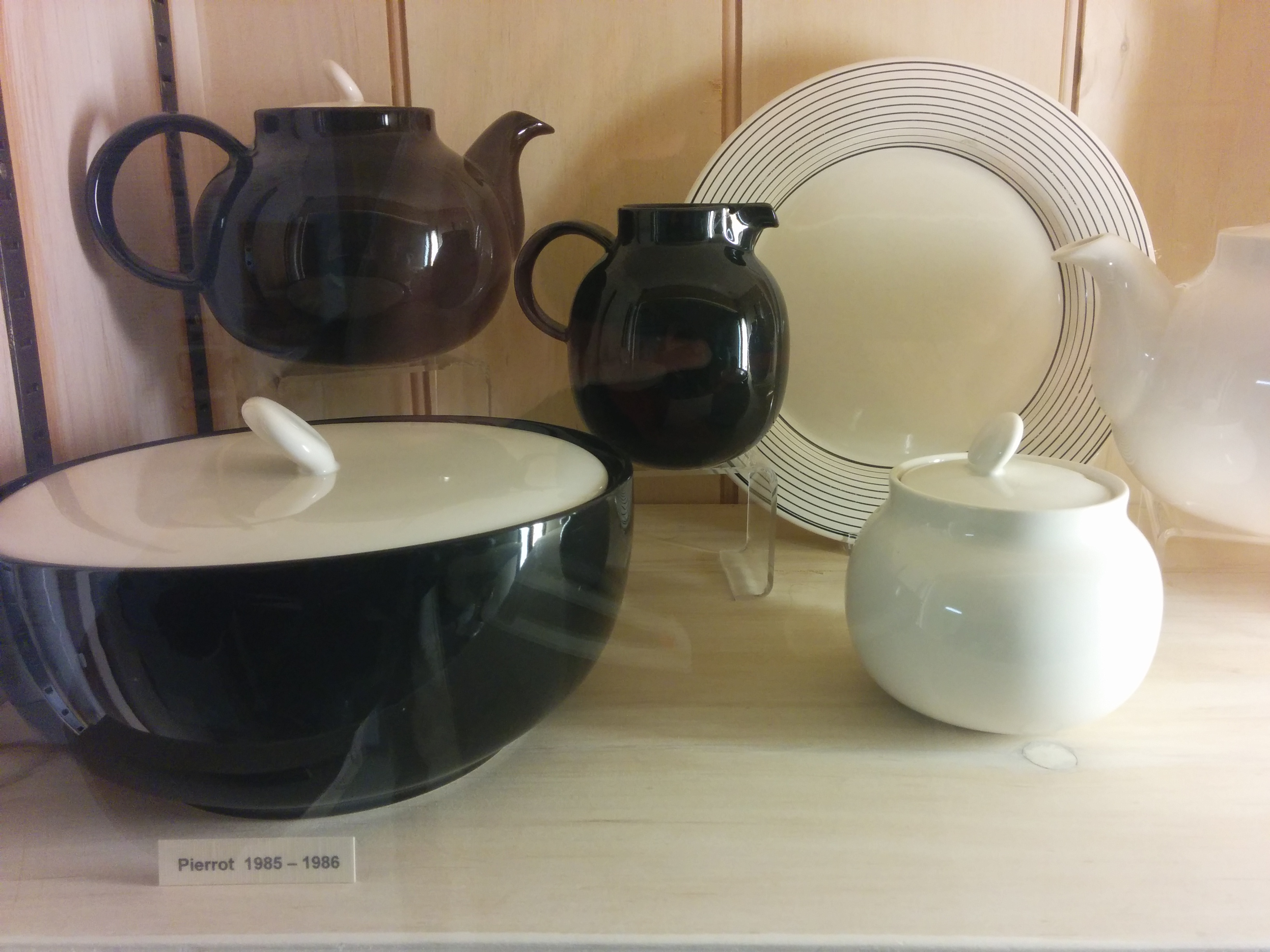
"Pierrot" pattern, 1985–86

In 1979 the number of employees rose to 460, and by 1981 it peaked at 700. However, this state of affairs did not last and after 1978 profits plummeted owing to development costs associated with its new factory in Lancaster, and production losses at its new plant. In 1980 a team from the National Westminster Bank was sent to review the company's management and appoint a new managing director, Mr Anthony Kusmirek who joined the company in 1975 as project director. Noel Rawson the sales director and Anthony Kusmirek the new managing director were both dismissed after attempting to redress the company's sales performance and improve the product range. In 1981 the National Westminster Bank then appointed Gordon Barker as managing director and nominated a new management team.

It was during this time that John Clappison’s unique Strata trinket boxes and his People series were produced. Clappison was made redundant on 31 December 1984, subsequently gaining employment with Royal Doulton. The ceramic tableware market was witnessing a great change with Japanese imports flooding the American market and cheaper tableware coming into Europe. The problems continued, and in April 2000 the National Westminster Bank sent in the receivers. The pottery factory no longer exists. The retail outlet shopping village known as Hornsea Freeport has traded on the main retail and touristic site ever since, whilst the old factory buildings have been demolished and the area re-developed for housing.

Following its dissolution, several of the redundant managers and staff were able to relocate to the newly constructed Park Rose Pottery, on a green field site situated on the main road entering the seaside town of Bridlington. Park Rose Pottery was founded by Anthony Kusmirek and Noel Rawson in 1982. The founder's original giftware range consisted of vases, plant pot holders and ceramic lamp bases. One of their first customers was IKEA. They went on to produce and sell a successful range of designer ware in their own right. Park Rose Pottery itself ceased to trade in June 2012. Hornsea Pottery designs are now available across a wide range of homewares, clothing and accessories via the official Hornsea Pottery website.

== Museum ==
Over 2,000 pieces from the pottery's beginnings in 1949 to 2000 are on display in two converted 18th-century cottages in Hornsea Museum in Newbegin, the main street of Hornsea. Geoffrey Hindle (known as Jolley Geoff), son of Bob Hindle, who served as the company's sales director, and nephew of Desmond Rawson, has recorded the work of both men, donated the family's pieces of pottery and many photographs to help the collection's guardians Carol Harker and Museum founder Dr Stuart Walker document the company's history.

The Intellectual Properties of Hornsea Potteries including all the designs and trademarks were acquired at the time of receivership by Hornsea Potteries Intellectual Properties Ltd.

== See also ==
- Scarborough Pottery
