= Flamborough Head Lighthouse =

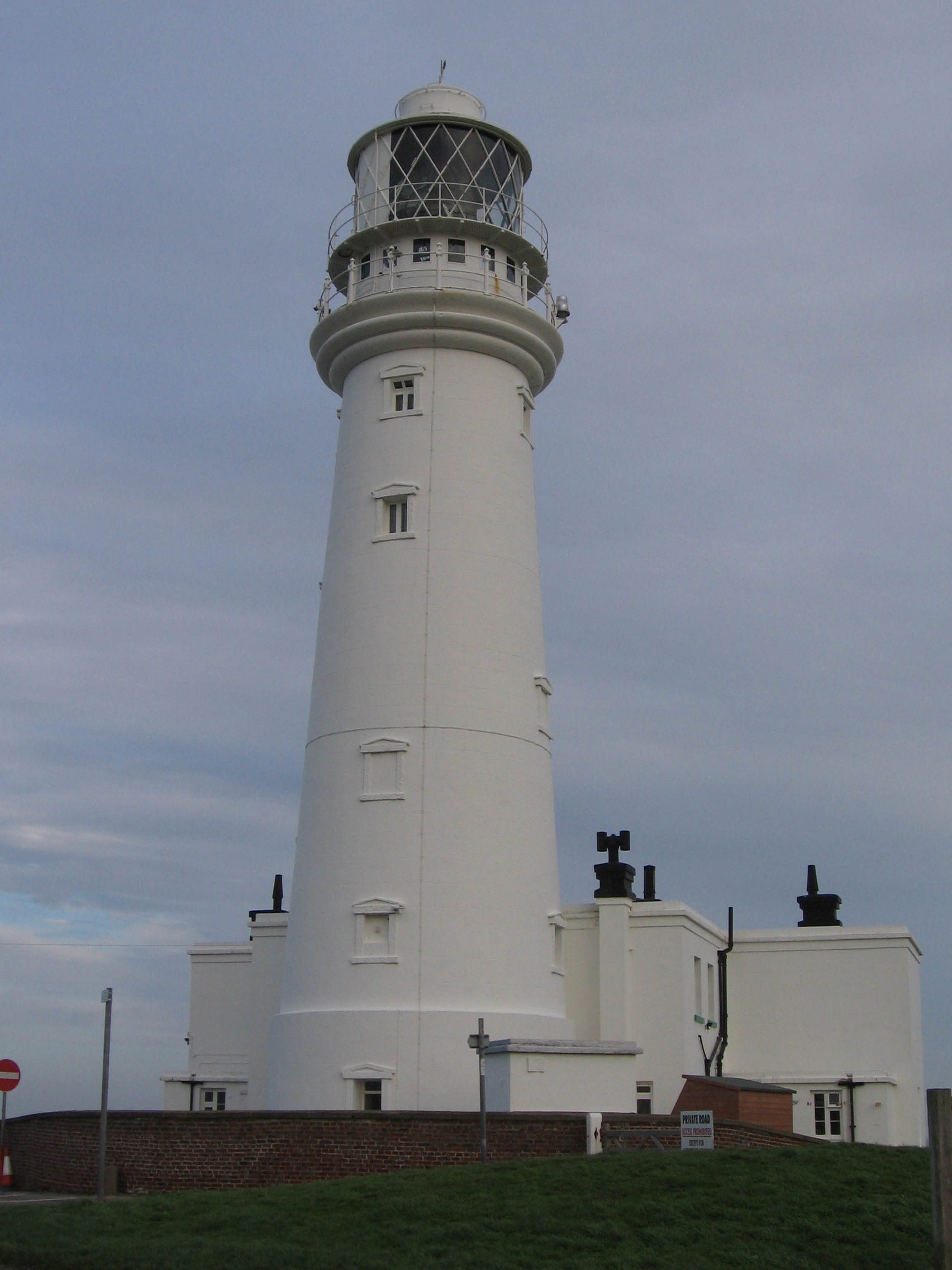
- Location: Flamborough; East Riding of Yorkshire; England
- OS grid: TA2543270648
- Coordinates: 54°06′59″N 0°04′57″W

Tower
- Constructed: 1806
- Designed by: Samuel Wyatt
- Construction: brick
- Automated: 1996
- Height: 26.5 m (87 ft)
- Shape: cylindrical tower with double balcony and lantern
- Markings: White
- Operator: Trinity House, East Riding of Yorkshire Council
- Heritage: Grade II listed building
- Fog signal: 1 blast every 90s. (formerly 2 blasts every 90s until 2022)

Light
- First lit: 1 December 1806
- Focal height: 65 m (213 ft)
- Lens: first order Fresnel lens (until 2022 were replaced by LED lantern lens since removed and on display as of 2022)
- Light source: LED (from 2022)
- Intensity: 433,000 candela
- Range: 18 nmi (33 km; 21 mi)
- Characteristic: Fl(4) W 15s
- Chalk Tower
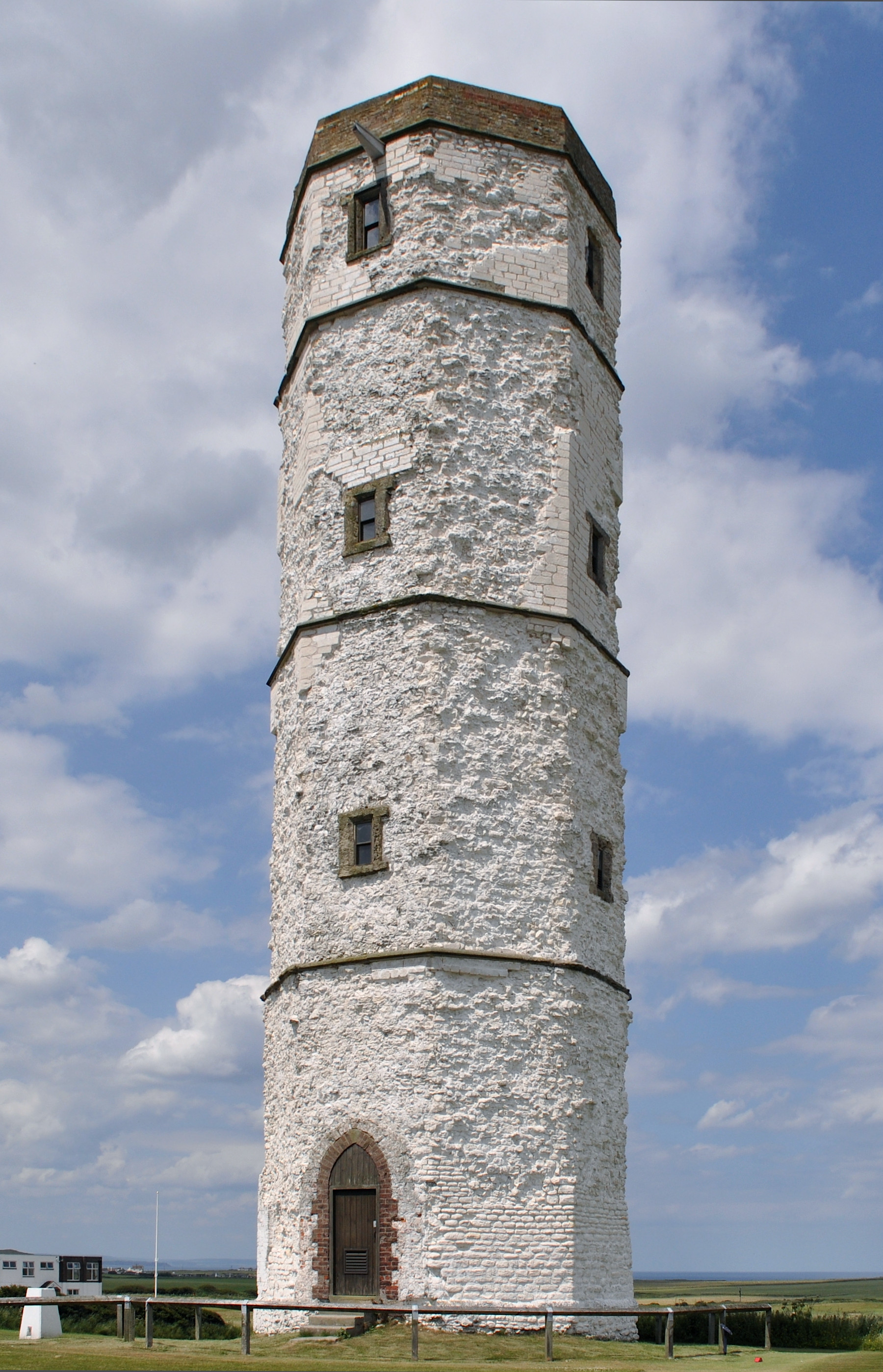
- Constructed: 1669
- Height: 24 m (79 ft)
- Shape: octagon
- Markings: White
- Heritage: Grade II* listed building, scheduled monument
- First lit: 1674

Flamborough Head Lighthouse is an active lighthouse located at Flamborough, East Riding of Yorkshire. England. Flamborough Head Lighthouse acts as a waypoint for passing deep sea vessels and coastal traffic, and marks Flamborough Head for vessels heading towards Scarborough and Bridlington.

== Old lighthouse ==
The first lighthouse, built by Sir John Clayton, was completed in 1674 and is one of the oldest surviving complete lighthouses in England. Built from chalk, it was never lit. This is now a Grade II* listed building.

== Current lighthouse ==
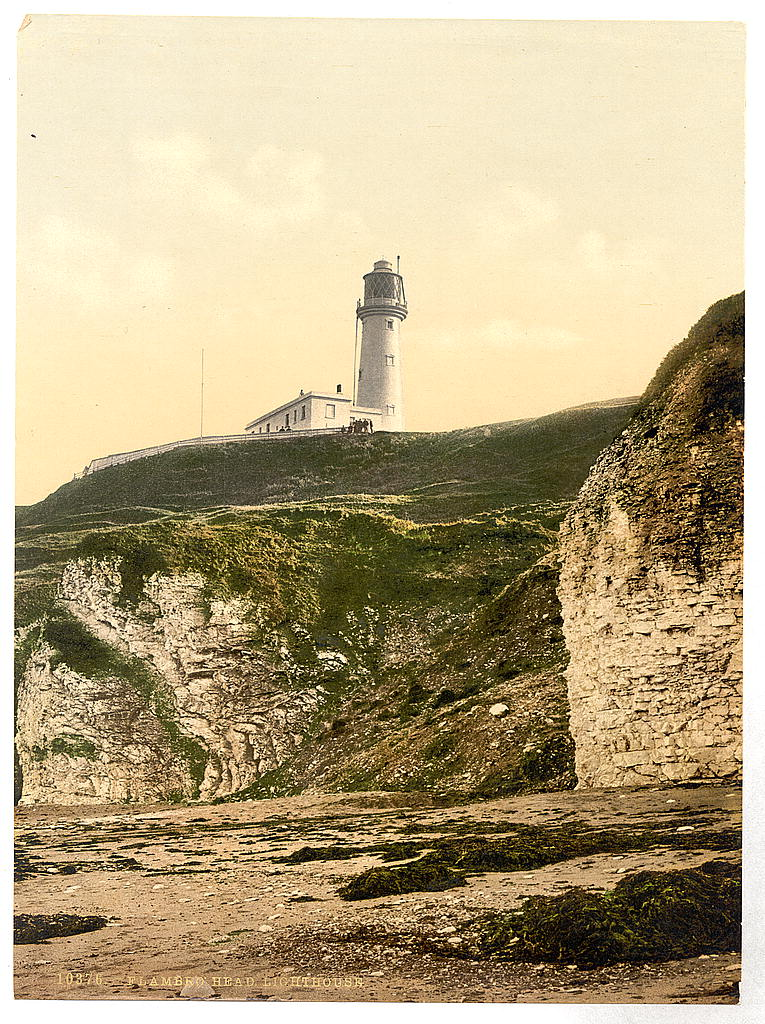
The lighthouse c. 1890

The present lighthouse, designed by Samuel Wyatt and costing £8,000 to build, was first lit on 1 December 1806. It had a distinctive light characteristic of two white flashes followed by a red flash. This was provided by the lighting apparatus, which was designed by optics specialist George Robinson, who was also Chief Inspector of Lighthouses at Trinity House. It consisted of a revolving vertical shaft with a three-sided frame on which were mounted 21 argand lamps, 7 on each side, with parabolic reflectors. On one of the three sides the reflectors were covered with red glass: this was the first use of red glass in a lighthouse and represented the first use of the colour as part of a light characteristic; the idea was soon taken up elsewhere. According to a description of the lighthouse written in 1818, the red light was used to distinguish Flamborough's lighthouse from the one at Cromer. A Victorian pilot book used the mnemonic: 'Two whites to one red / Indicates Flambro' Head'.

In 1872, a new paraffin lamp was installed to the design of James Douglass. Flamborough was the first Trinity House lighthouse to use paraffin, which had only lately been introduced as a lighthouse illuminant; afterwards, the Corporation upgraded all its oil burners to paraffin.

Along with the new lamp, a new first-order dioptric optic was installed, by Chance Brothers of Smethwick, The revolving optic was designed to maintain the lighthouse's characteristic of two white flashes followed by one red flash; the speed of revolution was changed, however, from a flash every two minutes to a flash every 30 seconds. Driven by clockwork, the optic was described at the time as 'a circular frame of six faces, composed of great glass prisms, [...] the third and sixth faces having sheets of ruby glass before them to give the red effect to the light'. These red-flashing lenses were made more than double the width of the clear white-flashing panels, to compensate for the reduced intensity caused by the ruby filters; with a width in azimuth of 69.5°, they were at the time the widest lens panels yet constructed. The alterations cost £7,000 and provided a range of 21 nautical miles (39 km; 24 mi). In 1907 the speed of rotation was increased, so as to give a flash every fifteen seconds.

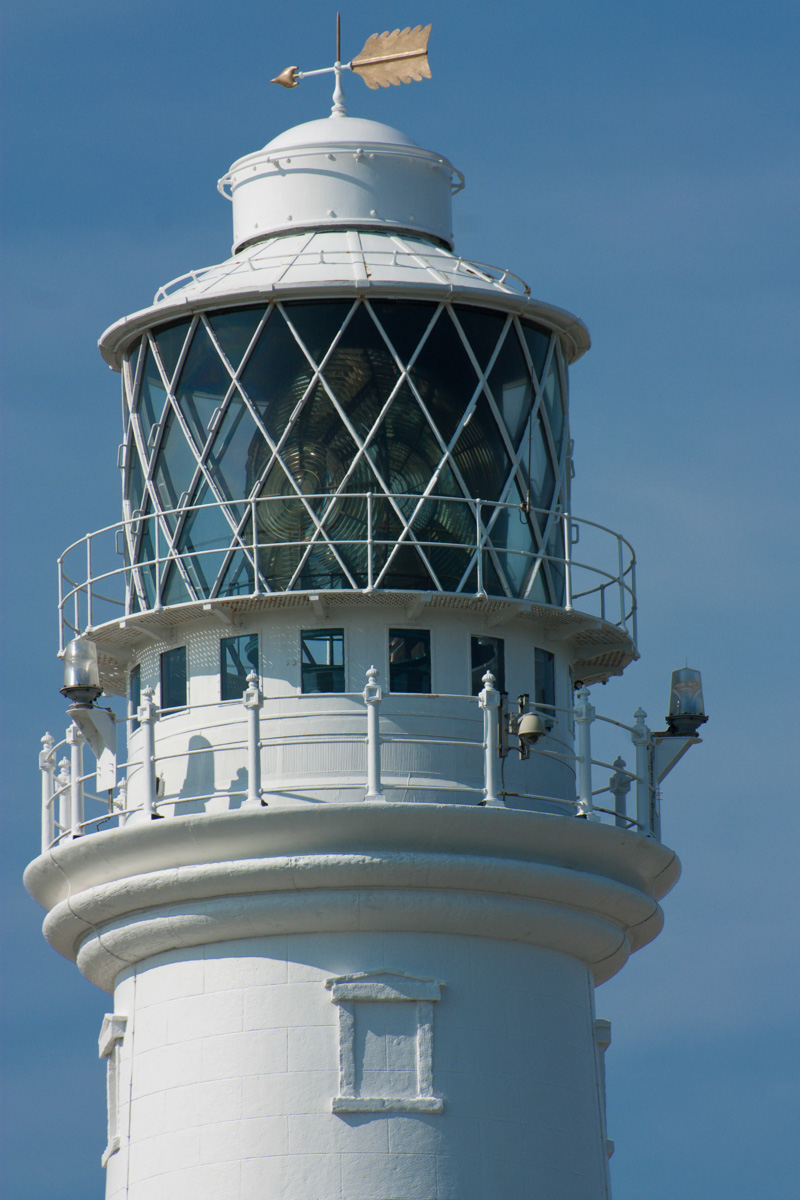
The expanded lantern containing the lens

In 1925 the lantern was made taller, to accommodate a new 15-foot lens: a large (first-order) revolving catadioptric optic made up of four asymmetrical panels, which displayed four white flashes every fifteen seconds. (After the new lens was installed, the old apparatus was transferred to the Bahamas to be used as part of a programme of improvements to the lighthouses there.) The light was converted from oil to electricity in 1940.

Following automation, the last lighthouse keepers left on 8 May 1996. The lighthouse remains in use; it is now a Grade II listed building.

In 2022 the lighthouse was once again modernised: the revolving Fresnel optic was removed; it and the emergency light were replaced by a pair of static LED lanterns. As part of the modernisation programme the visible range of the light was reduced from 24 nautical miles (44 km; 28 mi) to 18 nmi (33 km; 21 mi).

The lighthouse is open to the public at certain times of the year; the decommissioned optic has been placed on display in the visitor centre on site.

=== Fog signal station ===
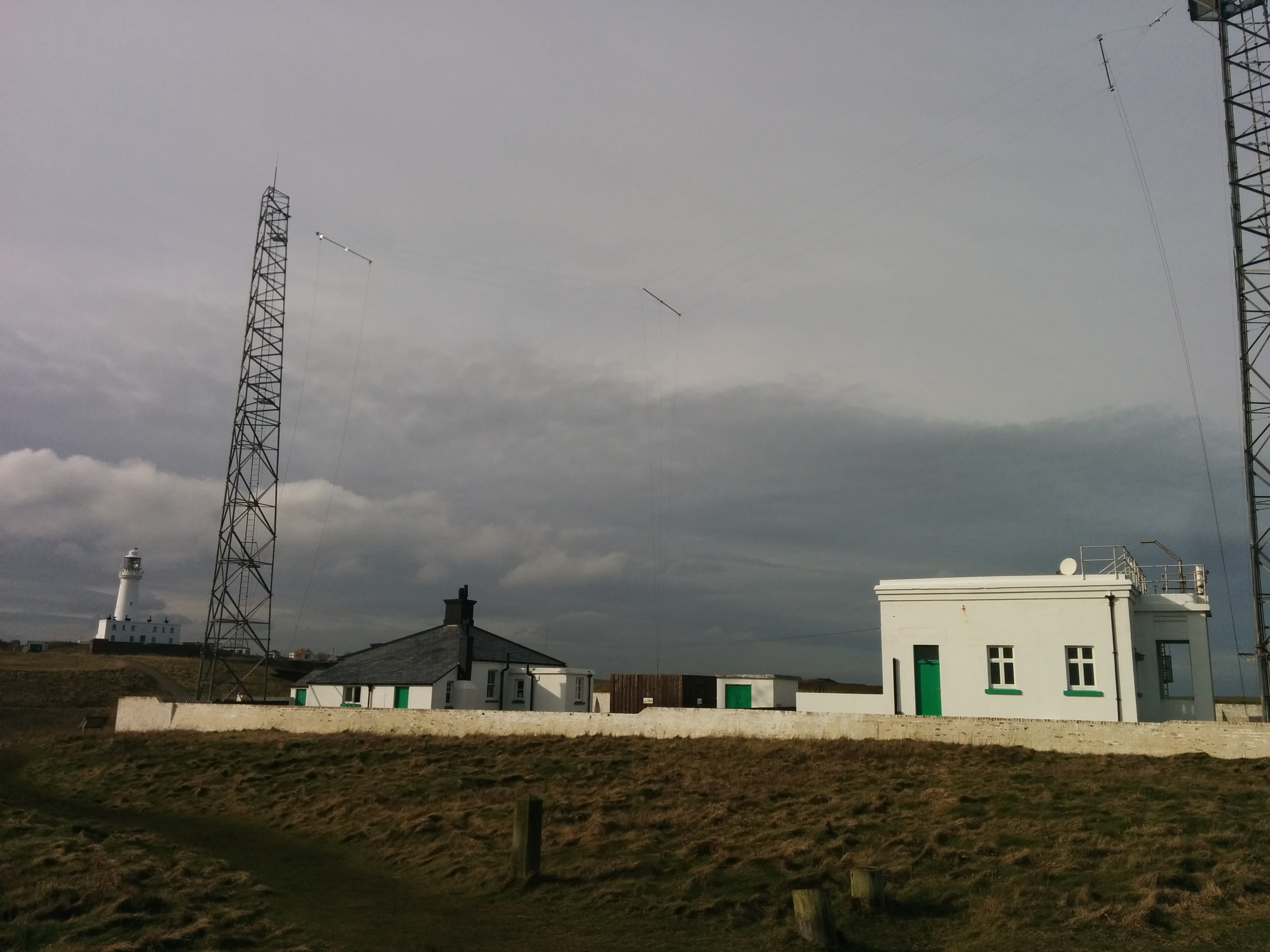
The fog signal station: former signalmen's cottage (left) and engine house (right).

In 1859 a fog signal station was built (at some distance from the lighthouse, close to the cliff edge). Initially an 18-pound gun was used as the fog signal, sounded once every fifteen minutes. A cottage was built within the compound as accommodation for the gunners. In 1878, explosive rockets replaced the cannon, discharged every 10 minutes in foggy weather (every five minutes from 1896) and reaching an altitude of 600 feet (180 m).

In 1908 an engine house was built next to the cottage and a fog siren replaced the rockets; it sounded one long and one short blast, every 90 seconds, through a pair of Rayleigh trumpets mounted on the engine room roof. Compressed air for the siren was provided by a pair of 22 hp Hornsby oil engines linked to a single-cylinder Hornsby compressor.

In 1924 the siren was replaced by a pair of diaphones, mounted in a metal turret on top of a porch added to the front of the engine house. This was itself superseded by an electric fog signal in 1975. In 2022 the signal was altered from two blasts to one long blast, every 90 seconds.

The fog signal compound remains in Trinity House ownership; along with the modern fog signal apparatus, it has since 1998 accommodated a Differential Global Positioning System (DGPS) signal station.

== See also ==
- List of lighthouses in England
- Grade II* listed buildings in the East Riding of Yorkshire
- Listed buildings in Flamborough
