= Flamborough =

Village and civil parish in the East Riding of Yorkshire, England

Coordinates: 54°06′56″N 0°07′29″W

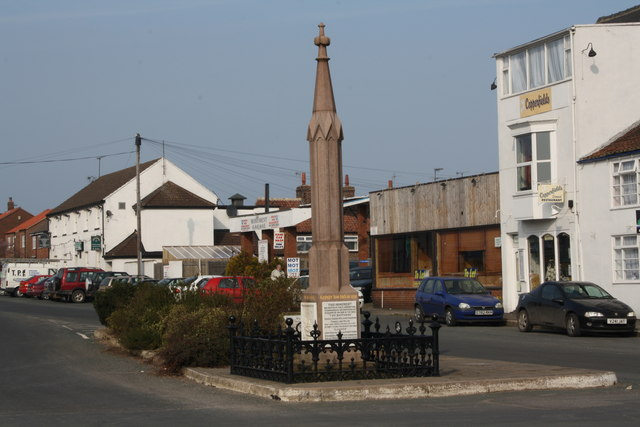
- Flamborough Fishing memorial

- Location within the East Riding of Yorkshire
- Population: 2,161 (2011 census)
- OS grid reference: TA226704
  - London: 180 mi (290 km) S
- Civil parish: Flamborough
- Unitary authority: East Riding of Yorkshire
- Ceremonial county: East Riding of Yorkshire
- Region: Yorkshire and the Humber
- Country: England
- Sovereign state: United Kingdom
- Post town: BRIDLINGTON
- Postcode district: YO15
- Dialling code: 01262
- Police: Humberside
- Fire: Humberside
- Ambulance: Yorkshire
- UK Parliament: Bridlington and The Wolds

Flamborough is a village and civil parish in the East Riding of Yorkshire, England. It is situated approximately 4 miles (6 km) north-east of Bridlington town centre on the prominent coastal feature of Flamborough Head.

The most prominent man-made feature of the area is Flamborough Head Lighthouse. The headland extends into the North Sea by approximately 6 miles (10 km). To the north, the chalk cliffs stand at up to 400 feet (120 m) high. For information about its founding, see Thorgils Skarthi.

According to the 2011 UK Census, Flamborough parish had a population of 2,161, an increase on the 2001 UK Census figure of 2,121.

The name Flamborough probably derives from the Old Norse personal name Flenn and the Old English burh meaning 'fortification'. Alternatively, the first element could be derived from the Old Norse fleinn meaning arrow, perhaps used in a topographical sense. Tradition holds that the village was founded by Fleyn (or Kormak), the brother of Skarthi (the founder of Scarborough).

St Oswald's Church, Flamborough stands in the village and was designated a Grade II* listed building in 1966 and is now recorded in the National Heritage List for England, maintained by Historic England. The village centre contains a number of shops and public houses. The Royal Dog and Duck is at Dog and Duck Square.

In the village are the fragmentary remains of Flamborough Castle, a medieval fortified manor house.

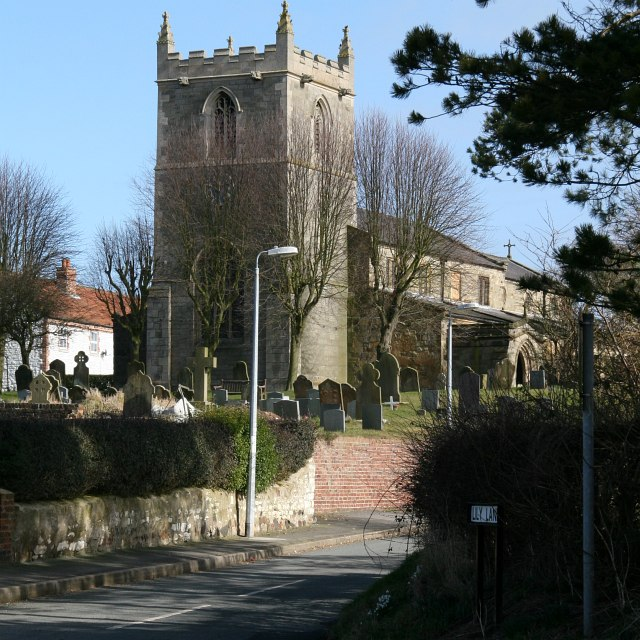
St Oswald's Parish Church

In 1823 the village was a parish in the Wapentake of Dickering. Flamborough was recorded as "merely a fishing village" with a "very ancient station, formerly of some note". The population at the time was 917, half of which constituted the families of fishermen. Occupations included eleven farmers, two blacksmiths, two butchers, two grocers, seven carpenters, four shoemakers, three tailors, a stonemason & flour dealer, a bacon & flour dealer, a weaver, a corn miller, a straw hat manufacturer, and the landlords of the Sloop, the Board and the Dog and Duck public houses. Also listed was a schoolmaster and a gentlewoman. Four carriers operated in the village, destinations being Hull and York twice a week, and Bridlington, daily. With St Oswald's Church was a Methodist and a Primitive Methodist chapel.

Between 1894 and 1974 Flamborough was a part of the Bridlington Rural District, in the East Riding of Yorkshire. Between 1974 and 1996 it was part of the Borough of North Wolds (later Borough of East Yorkshire), in the county of Humberside.

According to local legend, the village is haunted by the ghost of a suicide known as Jenny Gallows.

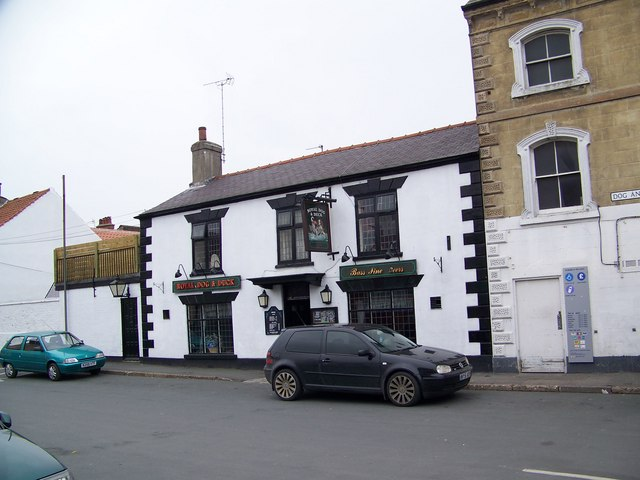
The Royal Dog and Duck

Flamborough, with its holiday camps and a caravan park, is a holiday destination during the summer months. The village holds an annual Fire Festival on New Year's Eve which in 2017 attracted 5,000 people.

In 2016 North Landing was used in the filming of the Dads Army film.

In 2018 the beach at Flamborough was used in the filming of the ITV drama Victoria.

Local news and television programmes are provided by BBC Yorkshire and Lincolnshire and ITV Yorkshire. Television signals are received from the Belmont TV transmitter.

Local radio stations are BBC Radio Humberside, Hits Radio East Yorkshire & North Lincolnshire, Capital Yorkshire, Greatest Hits Radio Yorkshire Coast, Nation Radio East Yorkshire, and This is The Coast.

Flamborough is served by Bridlington Free Press and the East Riding Mail.

== See also ==
- Listed buildings in Flamborough
- Flamborough Lifeboat Station
