= Dorothy Marion Campbell =

Dorothy Marion Campbell (11 January 1911 in Hedon, Yorkshire – 3 October 2005 in East Riding of Yorkshire) was an English potter.

Early in 1954 Marion replied to Hornsea Pottery’s advertisement in the Hull Daily Mail for ‘a modeller in clay’ and was invited to work for the Rawson brothers. She worked from home, and took her completed models to Hornsea Pottery on the bus.

Her designs for Hornsea, especially the African and Arctic figures, stylised vases, dogs, giraffes and cats are highly prized by collectors. Her 1956 Arctic fox and Weasel vase can be found in the Ceramics Galleries of the Victoria and Albert Museum.

She lived in East Riding of Yorkshire all her life and died in her 95th year.
