= Hornsea Museum =

Local museum in Hornsea, England

Coordinates: 53.9111°N 0.1714°W

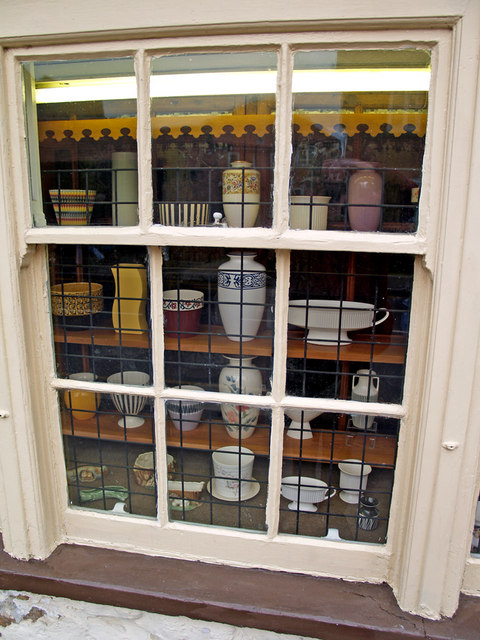
Hornsea Pottery in a window at Hornsea Museum.

Hornsea Museum is a local museum in Hornsea, East Riding of Yorkshire, northern England.

== History ==
The museum was established in 1978. It is housed in an 18th-century farmhouse and two cottages. The museum is a registered charity (No. 509615) and is largely run by volunteers. The museum is a member of the Holderness museums collaboration.

The farmhouse was occupied by the Burn family for almost 300 years. The museum presents Victorian rural life and local history concerning north Holderness. Rooms present life in Victorian times, including a bedroom, the dairy, kitchen, parlour, and wash-house.

Outside the farmhouse, set in a large garden, are a barn, craft workshops, a Victorian school room and a Victorian street scene. In addition, there is an exhibition room showing militaria and another exhibiting childhood and toys. The Whitedale building has displays on the history of the Hull and Hornsea Railway and Hornsea's fishing heritage.

The cottages have exhibition rooms containing some 2,000 items of Hornsea Pottery.

== Time On My Hands ==
Time On My Hands is an oral history archive which is lodged with the three Holderness museums: Hornsea, along with Hedon and Holderness. Over 60 hours of local interviews are held and available to view at the museums, which give a snapshot of how life used to be in this remote area of East Riding of Yorkshire in the first part of the twentieth century.

== Architecture ==
The building was constructed in the late 16th century as a farmhouse, and was largely rebuilt in the late 18th century. It is built of brick on cobble foundations, colourwashed on the front, with a dentiled brick eaves cornice, and a pantile roof with raised gables. There are two storeys and attics, and two bays. On the front is a doorway, above which is a blind oculus. The windows on the ground floor are horizontally sliding sashes, and the upper floor has casement windows. It is a grade II listed building.

== See also ==
- Listed buildings in Hornsea
