= John Clappison =

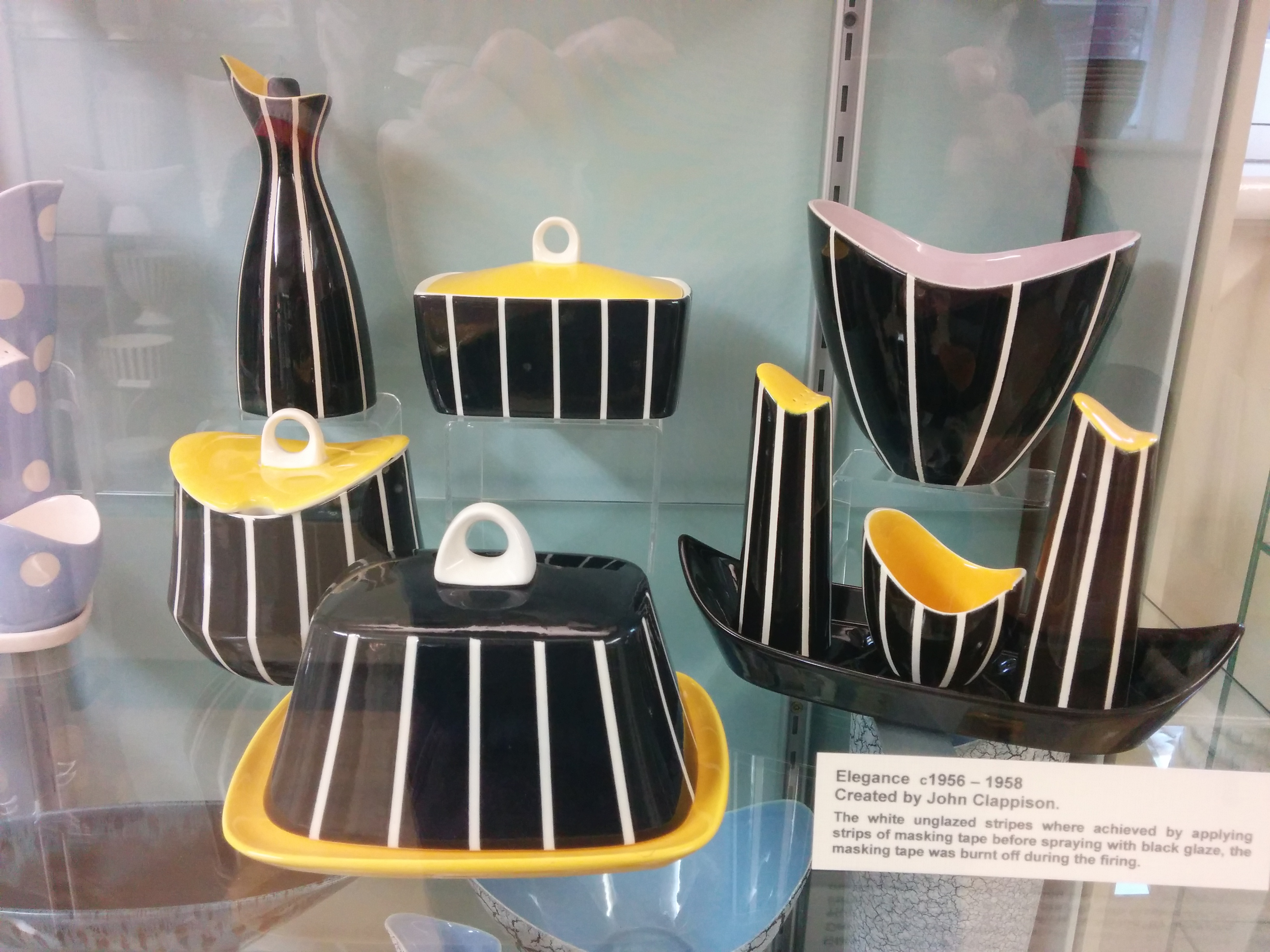
Hornsea Pottery "Elegance" pattern, designed by John Clappison, c. 1956

William John Clappison (27 June 1937 – 21 February 2013) was an English ceramic and glass designer. Although Clappison is not as familiar as many of his British contemporaries (his name not appearing on individual pieces), his work sold in the millions. Initially working out of the Hornsea Studio, partly financed by his father, Clappison would later work for Ravenhead Glass and Royal Doulton. Some of his more popular designs included the Heirloom range for Hornsea Pottery, his Studiocraft vases and his plain white Aphrodite vase, which became a popular wedding present of its time.

== History ==
Clappison was born in Hull, England, to Caeser 'Philip' and Enith Clappison. When the family moved to Hornsea and Philip Clappison, John's father, started to support Hornsea Pottery, and the founders of the Pottery, Colin and Desmond Rawson, saw great potential in John Clappison. He designed pieces such as Elegance and Tricorn for Hornsea Pottery whilst attending the Hull College of Arts and Crafts. The Pottery then sponsored his year at the Royal College of Art in London where he specialised in Industrial Design and Ceramics. After gaining the Faculty of Design Certificate in Ceramics at the Royal College of Art, Clappison was appointed as Hornsea Pottery's Chief Designer in 1958. A studio was specially built on the Pottery site where he originated a whole range of designs for tablewares, novelties and gift wares.

Clappison produced many designs for Hornsea Pottery such as his 'Home Decor' range, which are "highly reminiscent of the most advanced work in Studio Ceramics". Other tableware and decorative items that reflected contemporary designs were the 1950s hand-decorated Slipware, 1960s Studio vases, 1970s Muramics and mugs, and 1980s People Figures. Many of these items are actively collected.

In 1972, Clappison left Hornsea Pottery and became chief designer for Ravenhead Glass in Lancashire. He rejoined Hornsea in 1976, and when it went into receivership in 1984, he became head shape designer at Royal Doulton. He retired in 1998.

Clappison's designs were described as "in a completely new idiom.... they presaged trends which would be consolidated during the early 1960s". His designs were thought to have been a determining factor in the success of Hornsea Pottery, "it was only at the end of the 1950s, following the appointment of William John Clappison as chief designer in 1958 that Hornsea became a major force in modern design".

A biography on John Clappison, by Pauline Coyle, was published in April 2007. This official biography includes the full scope and variety of Clappison's work, and was written with his knowledge and co-operation.
